= Internal Revenue Code section 212 =

Internal Revenue Code § 212 (26 U.S.C. § 212) provides a deduction, for U.S. federal income tax purposes, for expenses incurred in investment activities. Taxpayers are allowed to deduct all the ordinary and necessary expenses paid or incurred during the taxable year--

- (1) for the production or collection of income;
- (2) for the management, conservation, or maintenance of property held for the production of income; or
- (3) in connection with the determination, collection, or refund of any tax.

Section 23(a)(2) of the Internal Revenue Code of 1939, the predecessor to section 212 of the current Internal Revenue Code of 1986, was enacted as part of the Revenue Act of 1942, effective retroactively for tax years that began after December 31, 1938, in the wake of the United States Supreme Court decision in the case of Higgins v. Commissioner. In Higgins, the taxpayer attempted to deduct expenses for the years 1932 and 1933 related to his investment efforts, which the U.S. Supreme Court held were rightly disallowed, under the tax statute as applicable to those years, by the Bureau of Internal Revenue (now known as the Internal Revenue Service). The Bureau contended, and the Court ruled, that investment efforts were not deductible as part of a "trade or business."

The United States Congress responded by enacting section 23(a)(2) of the 1939 Code. Congress did not grant investment activities the status of "trade or business" expenses, but instead acknowledged that since investment expenses were costs of producing income, they should be deductible.

Section 212(3) may allow for the deduction of accountant's fees associated with preparation of a federal income tax return.
