= The Law that Never Was =

1985 book by William J. Benson and Martin J. "Red" Beckman

- Title page for The Law That Never Was: The Fraud of the 16th Amendment and Personal Income Tax (1985)
- Author: William J. Benson; Martin J. Beckman
- Language: English
- Genre: Non-fiction
- Publication date: 1985
- Publication place: United States

The Law That Never Was: The Fraud of the 16th Amendment and Personal Income Tax is a 1985 book by William J. Benson and Martin J. "Red" Beckman which claims that the Sixteenth Amendment to the United States Constitution, commonly known as the income tax amendment, was never properly ratified. In 2007, and again in 2009, Benson's contentions were ruled to be fraudulent.

== Background ==
Under Article V of the U.S. Constitution, an amendment proposed by Congress must be ratified by three-fourths of the states to become part of the Constitution. The Article permits Congress to specify, for each amendment, whether the ratification must be by each state's legislature or by a constitutional convention in each state; for the Sixteenth Amendment, Congress specified ratification by the legislatures. There were 48 states in the Union in 1913 – the year when the Sixteenth Amendment was finally ratified – which meant that the Amendment required ratification by the legislatures of 36 states to become effective. In February 1913, Secretary of State Philander C. Knox issued a proclamation that 38 states had ratified the amendment. According to Congressional analysis, a total of 42 states had ratified the amendment as of 1992.

== Contentions ==
Prior to Benson, the "non-ratification" argument was presented by James Walter Scott in the 1975 case of United States v. Scott, some sixty-two years after the ratification. Scott's argument was to no avail; he was convicted of willful failure to file federal income tax returns for the years 1969 through 1972, and the conviction was upheld by the United States Court of Appeals for the Ninth Circuit. In a 1977 case involving a tax protester named Bob Tammen, a U.S. District Court noted that Tammen was involved with a group called "United Tax Action Patriots", which took the position "that the Sixteenth Amendment was improperly passed and therefore invalid". However, the specific issue of the validity of the ratification was neither presented to nor decided by the court. William Benson's book relates how, in 1984, nine years after the Scott case and seventy-one years after the ratification was proclaimed, Benson began a research project to investigate the ratification process by traveling to the National Archives and the capitols of various New England states to review documents relating to the ratification of the Amendment.

Benson found variations in wording, punctuation, capitalization, and pluralization in the language of the Amendment as ratified by many states. He used the changes as part of the basis for his contention that those states had not properly ratified the Amendment. Benson further claimed to have found documents suggesting that some states that had been certified as having ratified the Amendment never voted to ratify it, or voted against ratification. Benson claimed that no states, or only a few states (variously reported as two states or four states), had properly ratified the Amendment.

In his book, Benson made the following claims:

- Seven states (Connecticut, Florida, Oregon, Pennsylvania, Rhode Island, Utah, Virginia) did not ratify the amendment, and it was reported as such.
- Two states (Kentucky and Tennessee) did not ratify the amendment, but Secretary Knox reported that they did.
- Eight states (Delaware, Michigan, Nevada, New Hampshire, South Dakota, Tennessee, Vermont and Wyoming) were reported by Secretary Knox as having ratified the amendment, but the States actually have missing or incomplete records of the ratification procedures or votes, and there is no conclusive record that they ratified the amendment or reported any ratification to the Secretary of State.
- Six states (Idaho, Iowa, Kentucky, Minnesota, Missouri, Washington) did approve the amendment, but the Governor or another official who was required by their respective state constitutions to sign the legislation into law did not sign the legislation.
- In twenty-five states (Arizona, Arkansas, California, Colorado, Georgia, Idaho, Illinois, Kansas, Kentucky, Louisiana, Maryland, Massachusetts, Michigan, Mississippi, Missouri, Montana, New Jersey, New Mexico, North Dakota, Tennessee, Texas, Vermont, Washington, West Virginia and Wyoming), the legislature violated a provision of its state constitution during the ratification process.
- Twenty-nine states (Arizona, Arkansas, California, Colorado, Georgia, Idaho, Indiana, Iowa, Kentucky, Louisiana, Maryland, Massachusetts, Minnesota, Mississippi, Missouri, Montana, Nebraska, New Jersey, New Mexico, New York, Ohio, Oklahoma, South Carolina, South Dakota, Tennessee, Texas, Vermont, West Virginia and Wyoming) violated "state law" or procedural rules during the ratification process.

Additionally, Benson asserted that:

- Twenty-two states approved the amendment, but with changes in wording, and the inexact version was accepted as a ratification of the original version.
- One state approved the amendment, but with variations in spelling, and the inexact version was accepted as a ratification of the original version.
- At least twenty-six states approved the amendment, but with changes in punctuation, and the inexact version was accepted as a ratification of the original version.

Benson asserted that the Oklahoma State Legislature changed the wording of the amendment they approved so that it meant the opposite of the original amendment as it was submitted to the States by Congress, but that Secretary Knox counted Oklahoma as having approved the amendment.

Benson also asserted, as an example of a state's violation of its own Constitution, laws, or procedural rules, the claim that the Tennessee State Constitution prohibited the legislature from acting on any proposed amendment to the U.S. Constitution submitted by Congress until after the next state legislative elections. According to Benson, the Tennessee legislature acted on the proposed 16th amendment the same month it was received (prior to any new state legislative elections).

== Legal status of Benson's claims ==
The Benson book was published in 1985. The earliest reported court cases where the book was mentioned appear to be United States v. House and United States v. Wojtas. Benson testified unsuccessfully in the House case. In the latter case, defendant Wayne Wojtas was unsuccessful in his attempt to use Benson's theory to have his indictment for failure to file federal tax returns dismissed. In the case the judge ruled that Benson's evidence was inadmissible, stating that:

[T]he few cases that have been asked to deal with issues comparable to the one now tendered to this Court have uniformly held questions as to compliance with Article V's requirements are within the sole province of Congress and not the courts—in the language that has come to characterize such issues, they are "political" (that is, nonjusticiable).

Wojtas was convicted, sentenced to prison, and released in August 1986.

Benson's claim was also rejected in Miller v. United States. The court stated, "We find it hard to understand why the long and unbroken line of cases upholding the constitutionality of the Sixteenth Amendment generally, Brushaber v. Union Pacific Railroad Company ... and those specifically rejecting the argument advanced in The Law That Never Was, have not persuaded Miller and his compatriots to seek a more effective forum for airing their attack on the federal income tax structure." The court then sanctioned the litigants for advancing a "patently frivolous" position.

Similar "Sixteenth Amendment arguments" have been uniformly rejected by the courts in other cases including United States v. Thomas. In Thomas the court, in affirming the tax convictions of Kenneth L. Thomas, referred to Benson's book and noted that the errors found by Benson had already been investigated by Secretary of State Knox at the time of ratification of the Sixteenth Amendment, and had been determined to be insignificant. (See Tax protester constitutional arguments.)

Arguments that the Sixteenth Amendment was not properly ratified were also rejected in Sisk v. Commissioner; United States v. Sitka; and United States v. Stahl. The non-ratification argument has also been deemed legally frivolous in Brown v. Commissioner and Lysiak v. Commissioner.

The argument that the Sixteenth Amendment was not ratified, and variations of this argument, have been officially identified as legally frivolous federal income tax return positions for purposes of the $5,000 frivolous tax return penalty imposed under Internal Revenue Code section 6702(a).

== Benson's federal income tax problems ==
In United States v. Benson, a criminal case, Benson himself raised the Sixteenth Amendment argument, which was rejected by the United States Court of Appeals for the Seventh Circuit. In this phase of the case, his conviction for tax evasion and willful failure to file tax returns was overturned on other grounds and the case was remanded to the trial court.

Upon retrial, Benson was again convicted of tax evasion and willful failure to file tax returns, and his conviction was upheld on appeal. The conduct for which he was convicted involved over $100,000 of income he did not report on Federal income tax returns. He was sentenced to four years in prison and five years of probation.

Benson continued to promote his views. Until early 2008, Benson included verbiage on his web site – in quotation marks – that he attributed to the text of the U.S. Supreme Court decision in Brushaber v. Union Pacific Railroad, an early case interpreting the Amendment. He quoted the Court as saying that the Sixteenth Amendment "did not change the constitutional limitations which forbid any direct taxation of individuals." The text of the Court's decision does not contain any such quotation. No U.S. Federal court has ever ruled that any provision of the United States Constitution forbids any direct taxation of individuals. Benson apparently removed the material after a court order was issued regarding his materials.

Until January 2008, Benson's web site also stated: "After serving time in federal prison for not paying his United States income taxes, Bill Benson still does not pay income taxes and yet our federal government chooses not to arrest him. Why? Because now he can use this book, which he has written : 'THE LAW THAT NEVER WAS' in his defense." Similarly, as late as the year 2007, Benson claimed, in marketing the "Reliance Defense Package" that included his non-ratification argument, that "[t]o date, the IRS has steadfastly refused to prosecute any person standing on this defense. Why do they do this? Because they know they cannot win!!" The book was actually published several years before Benson's arrest and, as noted above, Benson himself actually was convicted despite using the defense.

In one of Benson's cases, the United States Court of Appeals for the Seventh Circuit stated:

Benson argues that he did not need to file tax returns or pay income taxes because the Sixteenth Amendment was not properly ratified. [....] The district court denied Benson's request for an evidentiary hearing on this issue and refused to hear any Sixteenth Amendment argument.

As the district court noted, we have repeatedly rejected the claim that the Sixteenth Amendment was improperly ratified. [...] One would think this repeated rejection of Benson's Sixteenth Amendment argument would put the matter to rest [...] Benson is the co-author of The Law That Never Was, a book that purports to "review the documents concerning the states' ratification of the Sixteenth Amendment" and to show "that only four states ratified the Sixteenth Amendment [and that] the official promulgation of the amendment by Secretary of State Knox in 1913 is therefore void." [...] Benson insists that as the co-author of The Law That Never Was, and the man who actually reviewed the state documents "proving" improper ratification, he is uniquely qualified to make the "exceptionally strong showing" we spoke of in Foster. Because of this, Benson insists, the district court should have at least granted him an evidentiary hearing on the Sixteenth Amendment issue.

Benson is wrong. In Thomas, we specifically examined the arguments made in The Law That Never Was, and concluded that "Benson ... did not discover anything." We concluded that Secretary Knox's declaration that sufficient states had ratified the Sixteenth Amendment was conclusive, and that "Secretary Knox's decision is now beyond review." [....] It necessarily follows that the district court correctly refused to hold an evidentiary hearing; no hearing is necessary to consider an issue that is "beyond review."

== Benson's non-ratification argument ruled fraudulent ==
On December 17, 2007, the United States District Court for the Northern District of Illinois ruled that Benson's "Reliance Defense Package" (including Benson's Sixteenth Amendment non-ratification argument), which Benson sold to customers via the internet, constituted a "fraud perpetrated by Benson" that had "caused needless confusion and a waste of the customers' and the IRS' time and resources".

The court stated: "Benson has failed to point to evidence that would create a genuinely disputed fact regarding whether the Sixteenth Amendment was properly ratified or whether United States Citizens are legally obligated to pay federal taxes. Also, as is indicated above, Benson is precluded in this action from taking the position that the Sixteenth Amendment was not properly ratified." The court stated that "the undisputed evidence shows that Benson had actual knowledge that the information in the Reliance Defense Package was false or fraudulent". The court also stated: "Benson falsely tells customers that if they purchase and use his products they will be shielded from criminal prosecution for violating the internal revenue laws. Purchasers of the 'Reliance Defense Package' receive a letter signed by Benson that falsely represents that the purchaser can rely on Benson's research to conclude that the Sixteenth Amendment was not ratified, and that the purchaser is thereby not required to file federal income tax returns or pay federal income or social security taxes to the United States." The court ruled that "Benson's position has no merit and he has used his fraudulent tax advice to deceive other citizens and profit from it" in violation of 26 U.S.C. § 6700.

The court granted an injunction under 26 U.S.C. § 7408 prohibiting Benson from promoting the theories in Benson's "Reliance Defense Package". which the court referred to as "false and fraudulent advice concerning the payment of federal taxes". The court injunction requires that Benson send his customers copies of the order, and that he post the order on his website. As of January 2008 Benson had modified his web site and posted a copy of the court order.

Benson appealed the decision of the District Court. Benson argued that prohibiting him from selling his "Reliance Defense Package" and his "16th Amendment Reliance Package" was a violation of his First Amendment Rights. The Court of Appeals for the Seventh Circuit rejected that argument in a ruling on April 6, 2009. The Court ruled that although Benson could sell his book, The Law that Never Was, the court order prohibiting him from selling his "Reliance Defense Package" and his "16th Amendment Reliance Package" did not violate his First Amendment Right, as the sale of those two items constituted "false commercial speech".

The Court of Appeals stated:

Benson knew or had reason to know that his statements were false or fraudulent. 26 U.S.C. [section] 6700(a)(2)(A). Benson's claim to have discovered that the Sixteenth Amendment was not ratified has been rejected by this Court in Benson's own criminal appeal. ... Benson knows that his claim that he can rely on his book to prevent federal prosecution is equally false because his attempt to rely on his book in his own criminal case was ineffective.

The Court of Appeals also ruled that the government could obtain a ruling ordering Benson to turn his customer list over to the government. Benson petitioned the United States Supreme Court, and the Supreme Court denied his petition in November 2009.

== Followers of Benson ==
Followers of Benson who have been convicted of federal tax crimes include Kenneth L. Thomas and Wayne Wojtas (see above). Additionally, on March 6, 2008, the United States Attorney's office in Grand Rapids, Michigan announced that Charles E. Hughes of Dansville, Michigan had been convicted of four counts of tax evasion. Hughes had purchased Benson's "16th Amendment Reliance Defense Package" for $3,500, and had used the materials. The U.S. Attorney's office stated:

Although the legal analysis and claims contained in the package have been thoroughly discredited, some persons who purchase this or similar packages have used it in an attempt to justify their decision to stop paying federal income taxes. Hughes made that choice. He failed to file his 2000 through 2002, and 2004 federal tax returns, despite having more than $300,000 in income over that period. In addition to his failure to file returns, Hughes also took affirmative steps to avoid having federal tax withheld from his income, including the filing of fraudulent forms.

Hughes was sentenced to 15 months in federal prison, and was incarcerated at Federal Correctional Institution at Ashland, Kentucky. He served his time and was released from prison in May 2009.

== See also ==
- Income Tax: Root of All Evil
- Pseudolaw
- Tax protester Sixteenth Amendment arguments
