= Tax protester Sixteenth Amendment arguments =

Arguments against income taxation in the United States

Tax protester Sixteenth Amendment arguments are assertions that the imposition of the U.S. federal income tax is illegal because the Sixteenth Amendment to the United States Constitution, which reads "The Congress shall have power to lay and collect taxes on incomes, from whatever source derived, without apportionment among the several States, and without regard to any census or enumeration", was never properly ratified, or that the amendment provides no power to tax income. Proper ratification of the Sixteenth Amendment is disputed by tax protesters who argue that the quoted text of the Amendment differed from the text proposed by Congress, or that Ohio was not a State during ratification, despite its admission to the Union on March 1, 1803, more than a century prior. Sixteenth Amendment ratification arguments have been rejected in every court case where they have been raised and have been identified as legally frivolous.

Some protesters have argued that because the Sixteenth Amendment does not contain the words "repeal" or "repealed", the Amendment is ineffective to change the law. Others argue that due to language in Stanton v. Baltic Mining Co., the income tax is an unconstitutional direct tax that should be apportioned (divided amongst various states according to their respective population), despite the court ruling in Stanton that "the provisions of the Sixteenth Amendment conferred no new power of taxation" and that income taxation is a "previous complete and plenary power... possessed by Congress from the beginning". Several tax protesters assert that the Congress has no constitutional power to tax labor or income from labor, citing a variety of court cases. These arguments include claims that the word "income" as used in the Sixteenth Amendment cannot be interpreted as applying to wages; that wages are not income because labor is exchanged for them; that taxing wages violates individuals' right to property, and several others. Another argument raised is that because the federal income tax is progressive, the discriminations and inequalities created by the tax should render the tax unconstitutional under the 14th Amendment, which guarantees equal protection under the law. Such arguments have been ruled without merit under contemporary jurisprudence.

== Sixteenth Amendment ratification ==
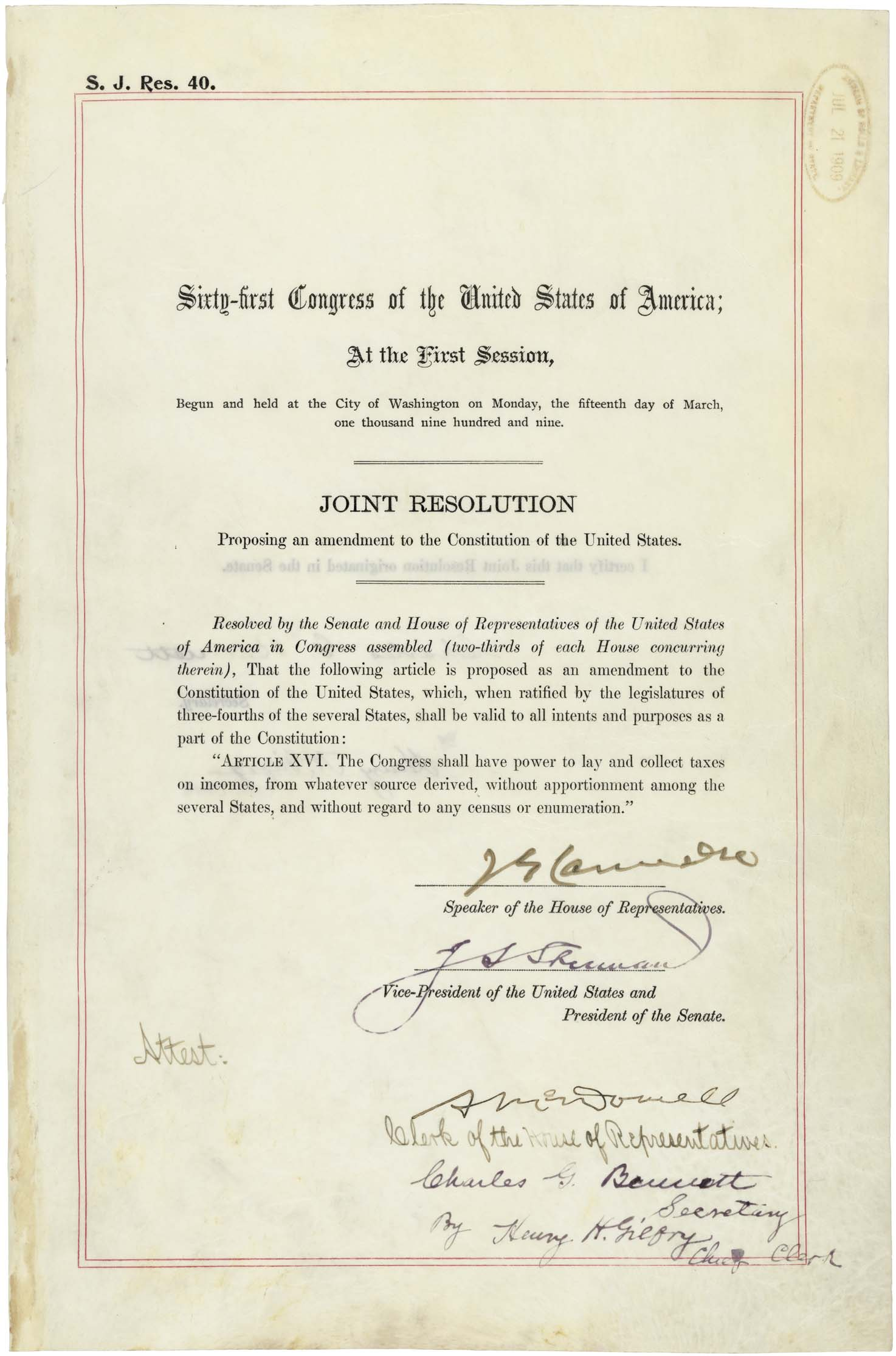
Amendment XVI in the National Archives of the United States of America. It provides that: "The Congress shall have power to lay and collect taxes on incomes, from whatever source derived, without apportionment among the several States, and without regard to any census or enumeration."

Many tax protesters contend that the Sixteenth Amendment to the United States Constitution was never properly ratified (see, e.g., Devvy Kidd).

The "non-ratification" argument was presented by defendant James Walter Scott in the 1975 case of United States v. Scott, some sixty-two years after the ratification. In Scott, the defendant – who called himself a "national tax resistance leader" – had been convicted of willful failure to file federal income tax returns for the years 1969 through 1972, and the conviction was upheld by the United States Court of Appeals for the Ninth Circuit. In the 1977 case of Ex parte Tammen, the United States District Court for the Northern District of Texas noted testimony in the case to the effect that taxpayer Bob Tammen had become involved with a group called "United Tax Action Patriots", a group that took the position "that the Sixteenth Amendment was improperly passed and therefore invalid". The specific issue of the validity of the ratification of the Amendment was neither presented to nor decided by the court in the Tammen case.

After the Scott and Tammen decisions, two lines of court cases eventually developed. The first group of cases deals with the claims of William J. Benson, co-author of the book The Law That Never Was (1985). The second line of cases involves the contention that Ohio was not a state in 1913 at the time of the ratification.

=== Benson contentions ===
The William J. Benson contention claims procedural issues in the ratification process, violations of state law, and that the legislatures of various states passed ratifying resolutions in which the quoted text of the Amendment differed from the text proposed by Congress in terms of capitalization, spelling of words, or punctuation marks (e.g. semi-colons instead of commas), and that these differences made the ratification invalid. Benson makes other assertions including claims that one or more states rejected the Amendment and that the state or states were falsely reported as having ratified the Amendment. The Benson arguments have been rejected in every court case where they have been raised, and were explicitly ruled to be fraudulent in 2007.

Benson contended that in Kentucky, the legislature acted on the amendment without having received it from the governor, and that the governor of the state was to transmit the proposed amendment to the state legislature. Benson also contended that the version of the amendment that the Kentucky legislature made up and acted upon omitted the words "on income" from the text, and that the legislature therefore was not even voting on an income tax. Benson asserted that once this error was corrected, the Kentucky senate rejected the amendment, although Philander Knox counted Kentucky as having approved it.

Benson also contended that in Oklahoma, the legislature changed the wording of the amendment so that its meaning was virtually the opposite of what was intended by Congress, and that this was the version they sent back to Knox. Benson alleged that Knox counted Oklahoma as having approved it, despite a memo from his chief legal counsel, Reuben Clark, that states were not allowed to change the proposal in any way.

Benson argued that attorneys who studied the subject had agreed that Kentucky and Oklahoma should not have been counted as approvals by Philander Knox, and that if any state could be shown to have violated its own state constitution or laws in its approval process, then that state's approval would have to be thrown out.

The earliest reported court cases where Benson's arguments were actually raised appear to be United States v. Wojtas and United States v. House. Benson testified in the House case to no avail. The Benson contention was comprehensively addressed by the Seventh Circuit Court of Appeals in United States v. Thomas:

Thomas is a tax protester, and one of his arguments is that he did not need to file tax returns because the sixteenth amendment is not part of the constitution. It was not properly ratified, Thomas insists, repeating the argument of W. Benson & M. Beckman, The Law That Never Was (1985). Benson and Beckman review the documents concerning the states' ratification of the sixteenth amendment and conclude that only four states ratified the sixteenth amendment; they insist that the official promulgation of that amendment by Secretary of State Knox in 1913 is therefore void.

Benson and Beckman did not discover anything; they rediscovered something that Secretary Knox considered in 1913. Thirty-eight states ratified the sixteenth amendment, and thirty-seven sent formal instruments of ratification to the Secretary of State. (Minnesota notified the Secretary orally, and additional states ratified later; we consider only those Secretary Knox considered.) Only four instruments repeat the language of the sixteenth amendment exactly as Congress approved it. The others contain errors of diction, capitalization, punctuation, and spelling. The text Congress transmitted to the states was: "The Congress shall have power to lay and collect taxes on incomes, from whatever source derived, without apportionment among the several States, and without regard to any census or enumeration." Many of the instruments neglected to capitalize "States", and some capitalized other words instead. The instrument from Illinois had "remuneration" in place of "enumeration"; the instrument from Missouri substituted "levy" for "lay"; the instrument from Washington had "income" not "incomes"; others made similar blunders.

Thomas insists that because the states did not approve exactly the same text, the amendment did not go into effect. Secretary Knox considered this argument. The Solicitor of the Department of State drew up a list of the errors in the instruments and – taking into account both the triviality of the deviations and the treatment of earlier amendments that had experienced more substantial problems – advised the Secretary that he was authorized to declare the amendment adopted. The Secretary did so.

Although Thomas urges us to take the view of several state courts that only agreement on the literal text may make a legal document effective, the Supreme Court follows the "enrolled bill rule". If a legislative document is authenticated in regular form by the appropriate officials, the court treats that document as properly adopted. Field v. Clark, 143 U.S. 649, 36 L.Ed. 294, 12 S.Ct. 495 (1892). The principle is equally applicable to constitutional amendments. See Leser v. Garnett, 258 U.S. 130, 66 L.Ed. 505, 42 S.Ct. 217 (1922), which treats as conclusive the declaration of the Secretary of State that the nineteenth amendment had been adopted. In United States v. Foster, 789 F.2d. 457, 462–463, n.6 (7th Cir. 1986), we relied on Leser, as well as the inconsequential nature of the objections in the face of the 73-year acceptance of the effectiveness of the sixteenth amendment, to reject a claim similar to Thomas's. See also Coleman v. Miller, 307 U.S. 433, 83 L. Ed. 1385, 59 S. Ct. 972 (1939) (questions about ratification of amendments may be nonjusticiable). Secretary Knox declared that enough states had ratified the sixteenth amendment. The Secretary's decision is not transparently defective. We need not decide when, if ever, such a decision may be reviewed in order to know that Secretary Knox's decision is now beyond review.

— United States v. Thomas

Benson was unsuccessful with his Sixteenth Amendment argument when he had his own legal problems. He was prosecuted for tax evasion and willful failure to file tax returns. The court rejected his Sixteenth Amendment "non-ratification" argument in United States v. Benson. William J. Benson was convicted of tax evasion and willful failure to file tax returns in connection with over $100,000 of unreported income, and his conviction was upheld on appeal. He was sentenced to four years in prison and five years of probation.

On December 17, 2007, the United States District Court for the Northern District of Illinois ruled that Benson's non-ratification argument constituted a "fraud perpetrated by Benson" that had "caused needless confusion and a waste of the customers' and the IRS' time and resources". The court stated: "Benson has failed to point to evidence that would create a genuinely disputed fact regarding whether the Sixteenth Amendment was properly ratified or whether United States Citizens are legally obligated to pay federal taxes." The court ruled that "Benson's position has no merit and he has used his fraudulent tax advice to deceive other citizens and profit from it" in violation of 26 U.S.C. § 6700. The court granted an injunction under 26 U.S.C. § 7408 prohibiting Benson from promoting the theories in Benson's "Reliance Defense Package" (containing the non-ratification argument), which the court referred to as "false and fraudulent advice concerning the payment of federal taxes".

Benson appealed that decision, and the United States Court of Appeals for the Seventh Circuit also ruled against Benson. The Court of Appeals stated:

Benson knew or had reason to know that his statements were false or fraudulent. 26 U.S.C. [section] 6700(a)(2)(A). Benson's claim to have discovered that the Sixteenth Amendment was not ratified has been rejected by this Court in Benson's own criminal appeal. ... Benson knows that his claim that he can rely on his book to prevent federal prosecution is equally false because his attempt to rely on his book in his own criminal case was ineffective.

The Court of Appeals also ruled that the government could obtain a ruling ordering Benson to turn his customer list over to the government. Benson petitioned the United States Supreme Court, and the Supreme Court rejected his petition on November 30, 2009.

In Stubbs v. Commissioner, Charles Stubbs argued that he had no Federal income tax liability because the Sixteenth Amendment had not been ratified properly. The Court rejected that argument, stating: "we find Stubbs' argument without merit. Notification by a state that it has ratified an amendment is binding upon the Secretary of State, and his official certification of ratification is conclusive upon the courts. ... Stubbs' assertion of fraudulent behavior on the part of the Secretary of State in certifying ratification does not remove the Secretary's determination from this conclusive effect." Similar Sixteenth Amendment arguments have been uniformly rejected by other United States Circuit courts in other cases including Sisk v. Commissioner; United States v. Sitka; and United States v. Stahl. The non-ratification argument has been specifically deemed legally frivolous in Brown v. Commissioner; Lysiak v. Commissioner; and Miller v. United States.

=== Ohio's statehood ===
Another argument made by some tax protesters is that because the United States Congress did not pass an official proclamation (Pub. L. 204) recognizing the date of Ohio's 1803 admission to statehood until 1953 (see Ohio § Statehood and settlement), Ohio was not a state until 1953 and therefore the Sixteenth Amendment was not properly ratified. The earliest reported court case where this argument was raised appears to be Ivey v. United States, some sixty-three years after the ratification and 173 years after Ohio's admission as a state. This argument was rejected in the Ivey case, and has been uniformly rejected by the courts. See also McMullen v. United States, McCoy v. Alexander, Lorre v. Alexander, McKenney v. Blumenthal and Knoblauch v. Commissioner. Further, even if Ohio's ratification was not valid, the Amendment was ratified by 41 other states, well in excess of the 36 needed for it to be properly ratified.

In Baker v. Commissioner, the court stated:

Petitioner's theory [that Ohio was not a state until 1953 and that the Sixteenth Amendment was not properly ratified] is based on the enactment of Pub. L. 204, ch. 337, 67 Stat. 407 (1953) relating to Ohio's Admission into the Union. As the legislative history of this Act makes clear, its purpose was to settle a burning debate as to the precise date upon which Ohio became one of the United States. S. Rept. No. 720 to accompany H.J. Res. 121 (Pub. L. 204), 82d Cong. 2d Sess. (1953). We have been cited to no authorities which indicate that Ohio became a state later than March 1, 1803, irrespective of Pub. L. 204.

The argument that the Sixteenth Amendment was not ratified and variations of this argument have been officially identified as legally frivolous federal tax return positions for purposes of the $5,000 frivolous tax return penalty imposed under Internal Revenue Code section 6702(a). The United States continues to recognize 1803 as the date when Ohio became a state, President Thomas Jefferson having signed, on February 19, 1803, an act of Congress that approved Ohio's boundaries and proposed state constitution. The resolution regarding this admission signed by President Dwight D. Eisenhower in 1953 recognizes March 1, 1803, as the date of Ohio's admittance into the Union.

== Sixteenth Amendment importance ==
=== Repeal clause ===
Some protesters have argued that because the Sixteenth Amendment does not contain the words "repeal" or "repealed", the Amendment is ineffective to change the law. According to legal commentator Daniel B. Evans:

There is nothing in the Constitution that says that an amendment must specifically repeal another provision of the Constitution. In fact, there are 27 amendments to the Constitution, and only one of them specifically repeals an earlier provision. (The 21st Amendment, which ended Prohibition, specifically repeals the 18th Amendment, which started Prohibition.) If this argument were correct, then the losing presidential candidate would be the vice-president of the United States, because the 12th Amendment did not expressly repeal Article II, Section 1, clause 3 of the Constitution. And Senators would still be selected by state legislatures, because the 17th Amendment did not expressly repeal any part of Article I, section 3, of the Constitution.

— Daniel B. Evans

In Buchbinder v. Commissioner, the taxpayers cited the case of Eisner v. Macomber and argued that "the Sixteenth Amendment must be interpreted so as not to 'repeal or modify' the original Articles of the Constitution". The United States Tax Court rejected that and all other arguments by Bruce and Elaine Buchbinder (the taxpayer-petitioners), stating: "We will not dress petitioners' frivolous tax-protester ramblings with a cloak of respectability. ... We find that petitioners in this case have pursued a frivolous cause of action. We find that they are liable for a penalty in the amount of $250.00 under the provisions of [Internal Revenue Code] section 6673." The actual statement by the United States Supreme Court in Eisner v. Macomber is that the Sixteenth Amendment "shall not be extended by loose construction, so as to repeal or modify, except as applied to income, those provisions of the Constitution that require an apportionment according to population for direct taxes upon property, real and personal ... In order, therefore, that the clauses cited from Article I of the Constitution may have proper force and effect, save only as modified by the Amendment ... it becomes essential to distinguish between what is and what is not 'income'."

=== Stanton v. Baltic Mining Co. ===
In Parker v. Commissioner, tax protester Alton M. Parker, Sr., challenged the levying of tax upon individual income, based on language in the U.S. Supreme Court decision in Stanton v. Baltic Mining Co., to the effect that the Sixteenth Amendment "conferred no new power of taxation, but simply prohibited the previous complete and plenary power of income taxation possessed by Congress from the beginning from being taken out of the category of indirect taxation to which it inherently belonged". The United States Court of Appeals for the Fifth Circuit rejected Parker's argument, and stated that Parker's proposition is "only partially correct, and in its critical aspect, is incorrect". The Court of Appeals re-affirmed that the Congress has the power to impose the income tax, and stated that the Sixteenth Amendment "merely eliminates the requirement that the direct income tax be apportioned among the states". The court ruled that Parker had raised a "frivolous" appeal.

Tax protesters argue that in light of this language, the income tax is unconstitutional in that it is a direct tax and that the tax should be apportioned (divided equally amongst the population of the various states).

The above quoted language in Stanton v. Baltic Mining Co. is not a holding of law in the case. (Compare Ratio decidendi, Precedent, Stare decisis and Obiter dictum for a fuller explanation.)

The quoted language regarding the "complete and plenary power of income taxation possessed by Congress from the beginning" is a reference to the power granted to Congress by the original text of Article I of the U.S. Constitution. The reference to "being taken out of the category of indirect taxation to which it [the income tax] belonged" is a reference to the effect of the 1895 Court decision in Pollock v. Farmers' Loan & Trust Co., where taxes on income from property (such as interest income and dividend income) – which, like taxes on income from labor, had always been considered indirect taxes (and therefore not subject to the apportionment rule) – were, beginning in 1895, treated as direct taxes. The Sixteenth Amendment overruled the effect of Pollock, making the source of the income irrelevant with respect to the apportionment rule, and thereby placing taxes on income from property back into the category of indirect taxes such as income from labor (the Sixteenth Amendment expressly stating that Congress has power to impose income taxes regardless of the source of the income, without apportionment among the states, and without regard to any census or enumeration).

The Court noted that the case "was commenced by the appellant [John R. Stanton] as a stockholder of the Baltic Mining Company, the appellee, to enjoin [i.e., prevent] the voluntary payment by the corporation and its officers of the tax assessed against it under the income tax section of the tariff act of October 3, 1913". On a direct appeal from the trial court, the U.S. Supreme Court affirmed the lower court's decision, which had dismissed Stanton's motion (i.e., had rejected Stanton's request) for a court order to prevent Baltic Mining Company from paying the income tax.

Stanton argued that the tax law was unconstitutional and void under the Fifth Amendment to the United States Constitution in that the law denied "to mining companies and their stockholders equal protection of the laws and deprive[d] them of their property without due process of law". The Court rejected that argument. Stanton also argued that the Sixteenth Amendment "authorizes only an exceptional direct income tax without apportionment, to which the tax in question does not conform" and that therefore the income tax was "not within the authority of that Amendment". The Court also rejected this argument. Thus, the U.S. Supreme Court, in upholding the constitutionality of the income tax under the 1913 Act, contradicts those tax protesters' arguments that the income tax is unconstitutional under either the Fifth Amendment or the Sixteenth Amendment.

=== Summary ===
According to the Congressional Research Service at the Library of Congress, a total of forty-two states have ratified the amendment.

Tax lawyer Alan O. Dixler wrote:

Each year some misguided souls refuse to pay their federal income tax liability on the theory that the 16th Amendment was never properly ratified, or on the theory that the 16th Amendment lacks an enabling clause. Not surprisingly, neither the IRS nor the courts have exhibited much patience for that sort of thing. If, strictly for the purposes of this discussion, the 16th Amendment could be disregarded, the taxpayers making those frivolous claims would still be subject to the income tax. In the first place, income from personal services is taxable without apportionment in the absence of the 16th Amendment. Pollock specifically endorsed Springer's holding that such income could be taxed without apportionment. The second Pollock decision invalidated the entire 1894 income tax act, including its tax on personal services income, due to inseverability; but, unlike the 1894 act, the current code contains a severability provision. Also, given the teaching of Graves [v. New York ex rel. O'Keefe, 306 U.S. 466 (1939)] – that the theory that taxing income from a particular source is, in effect, taxing the source itself is untenable – the holding in Pollock that taxing income from property is the same thing as taxing the property as such cannot be viewed as good law.

In Abrams v. Commissioner, the United States Tax Court stated: "Since the ratification of the Sixteenth Amendment, it is immaterial with respect to income taxes, whether the tax is a direct or indirect tax. The whole purpose of the Sixteenth Amendment was to relieve all income taxes when imposed from [the requirement of] apportionment and from [the requirement of] a consideration of the source whence the income was derived."

== See also ==
- Tax protester constitutional arguments
- Tax protester history in the United States
- Tax resistance
- Income Tax: Root of All Evil
