= 2026 California Proposition 40 =

Proposition 40
- November 3, 2026
- One-Time Wealth Tax for State-Funded Health Care Programs Initiative
- Reporting: 99% as of 10:00 PM PST

Results
| Choice | Votes | % |
|---|---|---|
| Yes | 6,277,656 | 47.93% |
| No | 6,819,469 | 52.07% |
| Total votes | 13,097,125 | 100.00% |
County results
Yes
50–60%
No
50–60%
60–70%
70–80%
80–90%

Proposition 40, also known as the California billionaire tax or California wealth tax, is a combined initiated constitutional amendment and state statute that appeared on the November 3, 2026, ballot in the US state of California. The measure would have imposed a one-time 5% tax on the accumulated wealth of the state's billionaires.

Revenue from the tax would have primarily funded state healthcare programs, with a smaller portion going toward food assistance and public education. The measure, which was sponsored by the labor union SEIU United Healthcare Workers West, was rejected in a 47.9%–52.1% vote.

== Background ==
Proposition 40 was drafted by tax law professors Brian Galle of UC Berkeley, David Gamage of the University of Missouri, Darien Shanske of UC Davis, and economist Emmanuel Saez of UC Berkeley. Labor union SEIU United Healthcare Workers West (SEIU-UHW) filed the initiative. In December 2025, state attorney general Rob Bonta issued the official title and summary.

On April 26, 2026, SEIU-UHW announced that they had collected 1.6 million signatures in support of the tax, nearly double the 874,641 required to qualify for the November ballot. On June 17, the California secretary of state announced that the wealth tax had qualified for the ballot with 980,438 valid signatures.

A day later, SEIU-UHW sent a letter to California governor Gavin Newsom—an opponent of the initiative—offering to withdraw the 5% wealth tax proposal if Newsom supported a smaller 2% levy on billionaires that would be passed by the state legislature; Newsom quickly rejected the amended proposal. Negotiations stalled before the June 25 withdrawal deadline, and the initiative was certified for the November ballot.

=== Impact ===
The initiative would have imposed the Billionaire Tax Act, a one-time 5% tax on the net worth of the California residents worth over $1 billion. 90% of revenue from the tax would have funded state-funded healthcare programs, including Medi-Cal, with the rest going toward food assistance and public education.

The eligibility cut-off outlined in Proposition 40 was January 1, 2026, meaning that if the initiative was passed by voters, billionaires who continued to hold residence in the state of California after that date would have been subject to the 5% tax. Seven of the state's estimated 214 billionaires were reported to have left California before or around the deadline, including PayPal co-founder Peter Thiel, former Uber CEO Travis Kalanick, Google co-founders Larry Page and Sergey Brin, and filmmaker Steven Spielberg.

==== Revenue ====
The California Legislative Analyst's Office found the wealth tax would create a temporary increase in revenue of up to tens of billions of dollars total, collected over several years. The analysis also discussed a "possible ongoing decrease" of less than $1 billion annually from billionaires leaving California.

SEIU-UHW, the labor union behind the initiative, estimated that the tax would generate $100 billion, though revenue from the billionaires who left the state prior to the deadline accounted for an estimated $29 billion of that sum, according to Fortune. Academic Kent Smetters cast doubt on SEIU-UHW's estimate, telling the Los Angeles Times that the union was "not accounting for the different ways that people can move or reclassify wealth". UC Berkeley economics professor Enrico Moretti described SEIU-UHW's revenue estimate as "way overly optimistic" and warned that the tax would "completely destroy California's economy".

The conservative-leaning Hoover Institution estimated that "permanent loss of income taxes from the departing residents indicates a high likelihood that net effect of the Billionaire Tax Act will be negative" by almost $25 billion. This conclusion was criticized by one of the bill's authors, David Gamage, who contended that the group's analysis "suggests that the billionaire tax might raise more revenue than our projections even say".

In a guest essay for The New York Times, Gabriel Zucman and initiative co-author Saez responded to concerns about billionaires fleeing the state, claiming that because billionaires are able to avoid income tax on most earnings, "even if all of them left the state, it would take 25 years for the loss of their tax payments... to surpass the amount the state would raise". In a working paper, Saez and Zucman, alongside co-author Jasper Boll of the Paris School of Economics, estimated that state income tax payments by California billionaires make up 2.4 percent of California's annual income tax revenue.

Economist Teresa Ghilarducci of the Economic Policy Institute, a pro-union think tank, considered an exodus of billionaires due to the tax unlikely, pointing to a 2022 Massachusetts 4% surtax on income above $1 million that exceeded projected revenue. Nuveen, an asset management company, also concluded billionaire outmigration was unlikely and that the tax posed "minimal risk" to California's credit profile and municipal bonds.

In October 2026, two Stanford University and Hoover Institution researchers—Benjamin Jaros and Joshua Rauh—released a working paper that simulated various possible outcomes if Proposition 40 was approved by voters. The researchers estimated that the tax could cost California $39 billion in tax revenue, with 85 percent of the 100,000 simulated plausible scenarios showing in a net negative revenue impact over the long term. Emmanuel Saez criticized the revenue estimates in the analysis and its assumption that billionaires would never return to California after the tax.

==== Effective tax rate ====
The Tax Foundation, a center-right think tank, argued that it was possible for the effective wealth tax rate to far exceed 5% for some taxpayers due to provisions related to dual-class share structures, but acknowledged that this would be unlikely in cases where valuations are clearly incorrect. The initiative's drafters published a report arguing that this concern was based on a misreading of the text.

==== Real estate ====
Forbes cited Proposition 40 as the reason for a real estate boom on Nevada's side of Lake Tahoe, noting that a number of lakefront homes were purchased by California billionaires after the proposal was announced. Bill Dietz, a Lake Tahoe realtor, told the magazine that a "clear acceleration of ultra-high-net-worth buyers moving from California to Nevada" took place, driven by "tax strategy".

In late 2025, Oracle founder Larry Ellison sold his San Francisco mansion for $45 million, choosing to relocate to Nevada; venture capitalist Steve Jurvetson later did the same. In June 2026, former U.S. ambassador to Kenya Meg Whitman and her husband, neurosurgeon Griffith R. Harsh, sold a number of properties in California, including a $17.9 million fly fishing ranch, purportedly over fears that the billionaire tax would be approved by voters.

== Campaign ==
=== Support ===
Sanders discussing the billionaire tax in February 2026

Pro-Proposition 40 yard sign in Berkeley

Supporters of Proposition 40 at a May 2026 rally

U.S. senator Bernie Sanders, a democratic socialist, endorsed Proposition 40. At a February 2026 Los Angeles rally in support of the tax, Sanders described billionaires as "oligarchs of the 18th century...[who] believe they have the divine right to rule". Many prominent supporters asserted that the billionaire tax is a necessary response to the Trump administration's restrictions and cuts to Medicaid, including former U.S. secretary of labor Robert Reich, who described the tax as a "practical way to keep the healthcare system functioning".

The state branch of the Democratic Socialists of America endorsed the billionaire tax, stating that "without this funding, thousands of jobs will be lost, millions of Californians could lose coverage altogether, and care facilities across the state could be forced to close".

U.S. representative Ro Khanna, a progressive Democrat who represents much of the Silicon Valley, expressed strong support for the tax. Some venture capitalists from Khanna's district responded by backing his unsuccessful primary challenger, Ethan Agarwal. Of the ten major Democratic candidates in the concurrently held gubernatorial election, only two—billionaire businessman Tom Steyer and state superintendent of public instruction Tony Thurmond—endorsed the tax.

Current Affairs editor Alex Scopic argued in favor of the tax, considering it an important method of countering the "buy, borrow, die" tax avoidance strategy used by some billionaires. Emmanuel Saez, a co-author of the initiative, said that the tax would "preserve [healthcare and education] programs that are crucial for California's economy".

In August 2026, the California Democratic Party endorsed Proposition 40. After a failed initial endorsement vote and an unsuccessful alternative motion to adopt a neutral position on the measure, a second endorsement vote yielded 61.7 percent in favor, narrowly exceeding the 60 percent threshold for endorsement.

In September 2026, a group of six progressive Nobel laureates of economics published a letter in support of the tax, arguing that it would help address growing inequality in California and loopholes that have allowed billionaires to avoid taxes on capital gains. The economists wrote that if California passed Proposition 40, it would "kickstart a movement" to tax ultra-high-net-worth individuals elsewhere.

==== SEIU-UHW extortion and abuse allegations ====
In February 2026, SEIU United Service Workers West (SEIU-USWW) president David Huerta and three other labor leaders filed a formal complaint against SEIU-UHW president Dave Regan, accusing him of extorting them by suggesting that he would "report unspecified governance concerns to the U.S. Department of Labor ... if [they] did not support the billionaire tax". An investigation initiated by the SEIU's national branch substantiated these claims as well as allegations from SEIU California executive director Tia Orr that Regan had threatened her by telling her to "endorse this measure ... or I'm coming for you".

A September 2026 report from SEIU California found that Regan had "engaged in a pattern of subjecting former and current SEIU California female directors to intimidating and threatening physical behavior" and substantiated former union leader Courtni Pugh's allegations that Regan physically assaulted her. Regan denied this and claimed that because Pugh worked as a political consultant against the tax, she had a reason to lie. A separate investigation found that Regan had intimidated and bullied SEIU California's government relations director, Jessica Bartholow, by standing "uncomfortably close" to her as "tensions flared over the billionaire tax" before "scream[ing] an expletive at her".

On September 11, 2026, the California Nurses Association, who supported Proposition 40, published a statement urging Regan to resign over "inappropriate, aggressive behavior and threats targeting other labor staff to support the Prop. 40 billionaire tax initiative." Regan dismissed the allegations as political retaliation over his support for the billionaire tax; an independent investigation found that his claims were unsubstantiated.

=== Opposition ===
California governor Gavin Newsom vocally opposed the tax, telling Politico in January 2026 that the proposal "makes no sense" and is "really damaging to the state". Most of the Democratic candidates who sought to succeed Newsom as governor opposed Proposition 40, including former U.S. representative Katie Porter, former Los Angeles mayor Antonio Villaraigosa, San Jose mayor Matt Mahan, and Newsom's eventual successor, former U.S. secretary of health and human services Xavier Becerra. Republican candidates Chad Bianco and Steve Hilton voiced opposition to the measure.

Ayn Rand Institute associate fellow Robertas Bakula argued in the Los Angeles Daily News that Proposition 40's eligibility deadline of January 1, 2026, would be illegal due to a constitutional ban on retroactive laws. In a February 2026 effort to curb the effects of the eligibility deadline in the event that Proposition 40 passed, U.S. representative Kevin Kiley introduced a bill in Congress that would prohibit states from retroactively levying taxes on former residents.

In an April 2026 editorial, The Wall Street Journal criticized wording in the act that would have allowed the state legislature to make amendments to widen the scope of eligibility for the tax. In May 2026, The Washington Post publicly opposed the "self-destructive" tax, stating that the initiative "has already cost the state more in lost future revenue from income taxes than it would raise". In September 2026, the Los Angeles Times published its first editorial in 18 months, urging voters to oppose Proposition 40, claiming that it was "poorly drafted" and has "insufficient guardrails to ensure the funds are spent to actually address Californians' most pressing healthcare needs". In a subsequent interview, former Los Angeles Times editor Mariel Garza noted that the newspaper's owner, Patrick Soon-Shiong, is a billionaire.

Google co-founder Sergey Brin spent more than $100 million opposing the tax.

Building a Better California, an organization co-founded by Sergey Brin and Eric Schmidt that opposed the billionaire tax, introduced two questions to the November 2026 ballot, both of which were designed to curb the effects of the billionaire tax if it passed. One, known as Proposition 41, would have barred new taxes from circumventing rules on education spending requirements for tax revenue, while the other, Proposition 42, would have invalidated the billionaire tax by amending the state constitution to forbid retroactive taxation. Another measure that would have required more audits of special taxes and imposed more rules on how revenue could be spent did not qualify for the ballot. Proposition 41 was narrowly rejected by voters, while Proposition 42 passed.

By August 2026, Building a Better California had raised $118 million, primarily from Brin, Chris Larsen, and John Doerr. Peter Thiel separately contributed around $100 million to an anti-Proposition 40 committee led by the California Business Roundtable.

Dozens of anti-Proposition 40 protestors staged a "pro-billionaire" march in San Francisco on February 7, 2026.

In June 2026, a number of progressive organizations announced their opposition to the billionaire tax. In a joint statement, Planned Parenthood and the California Medical Association criticized the wealth tax's ambiguity and described it as a "flawed response" to health care cuts, while the California Teachers Association stated that the billionaire tax "will not provide the sustainable and long-lasting funding that our schools and communities deserve". That same month, various California housing advocacy groups—including California YIMBY—opposed the tax, fearing that it would discourage investment and worsen the state's housing shortage.

Several California labor unions opposed Proposition 40, arguing that the measure contained a loophole that would allow the state legislature to tax the savings and retirement accounts of all residents. The political director of the Ironworkers District Council of the State of California and Vicinity claimed that the tax would be a "trap door for working families." A representative for the Los Angeles and Orange Counties Building and Construction Trades Council stated that Proposition 40 would negatively impact the state budget, which relies on tax revenue from wealthy residents.

=== Other reactions ===
Nvidia CEO Jensen Huang, who would have paid roughly $8 billion had the measure passed, stated he was "perfectly fine with it" and had "not thought about it once" when asked if he was concerned about the tax. He added that he and others "chose to live in Silicon Valley, and whatever taxes they would like to apply, so be it". The League of Women Voters of California adopted a neutral position on Proposition 40, stating that while the measure addressed "urgent needs", its one-time structure "conflict[ed] with sound public finance principles and risks long-term revenue loss".

== Endorsements ==
Support

Executive branch officials

- Robert Reich, former secretary of labor (1993–1997) (D)

U.S. senators

- Chris Murphy, Connecticut (2013–present) (D)
- Bernie Sanders, Vermont (2007–present) (I)

U.S. representatives

- Judy Chu, CA-28 (2009–present) (D)
- Ro Khanna, CA-17 (2017–present) (D)
- Aisha Wahab, CA-14 (2026–present) (D)

Statewide officials

- Tony Thurmond, superintendent of public instruction of California (2019–present) (D)

State legislators

- Bob Archuleta, SD-30 (2018–present) (D)
- Juan Carrillo, AD-39 (2022–present) (D)
- Lorena Gonzalez, former AD-80 (2013–2022) (D)
- Alex Lee, AD-24 (2020–present) (D)
- Liz Ortega, AD-20 (2022–present) (D)
- Celeste Rodriguez, AD-43 (2024–present) (D)
- ~~Lola Smallwood-Cuevas~~, SD-28 (2022–present) (D) (endorsement rescinded)
- Chris Ward, AD-78 (2020–present) (D)

Local officials

- Connie Chan, San Francisco supervisor from the 1st district (2021–present) (D)
- ~~Mara Elliott~~, former city attorney of San Diego (2016–2024) (D) (later opposed)
- Nikki Fortunato Bas, Alameda County supervisor from the 5th district (2025–present) (D)
- Jane Kim, former San Francisco supervisor from the 6th district (2011–2019) (D)
- Mai Vang, Sacramento city councilmember from the 8th district (2020–present) (D)

Individuals

- Saikat Chakrabarti, political advisor (D)
- Common, rapper
- Matthew Cooke, filmmaker
- Tim Disney, filmmaker
- Mistah F.A.B., rapper
- David Gamage, professor (initiative's co-author)
- Michael Hiltzik, columnist
- Jaron Lanier, computer scientist
- John O'Farrell, venture capitalist
- Hasan Piker, Twitch streamer
- Thomas Piketty, economist
- Emmanuel Saez, professor (initiative's co-author)
- Tom Steyer, businessman (D)
- Randy Villegas, 2026 candidate for CA-22 (D)
- George Zimmer, businessman
- Gabriel Zucman, economist

Labor unions

- AFSCME California
- California Federation of Teachers (previously neutral)
- California Labor Federation (previously neutral)
- California Nurses Association
- Committee of Interns and Residents
- International Association of Sheet Metal, Air, Rail and Transportation Workers Local 104
- National Union of Healthcare Workers
- SEIU United Healthcare Workers West
- Teamsters California
- UNITE HERE Locals 11 and 30
- United Teachers Los Angeles
- United Videogame Workers

Organizations

- 350 Bay Area
- 50501 Los Angeles
- ACLU of Southern California
- Alice B. Toklas LGBTQ Democratic Club
- Asian Pacific Environmental Network
- California Democratic Socialists of America
- California League of United Latin American Citizens
- California Young Democrats
- Chinese for Affirmative Action
- Chinese Progressive Association
- Color of Change
- Consumer Watchdog
- Courage California
- Democrats Abroad
- Environmental Health Coalition
- Indivisible San Francisco
- Our Revolution
- Oxfam America
- Patriotic Millionaires
- San Diego Pride
- San Francisco League of Pissed Off Voters
- San Francisco Tenants Union
- Stonewall Young Democrats
- Strategic Actions for a Just Economy
- TransForm
- Voters of Tomorrow California
- Women's Foundation California

Government bodies

- Santa Clara County Board of Supervisors

Political parties

- California Communist Party USA
- California Democratic Party
- California Working Families Party
- Freedom Socialist Party
- Green Party of California
- Los Angeles County Democratic Party
- Peace and Freedom Party

Newspapers and media

- Argus-Courier
- Berkeley Political Review
- Monterey County Weekly
- San Francisco Bay Guardian
- The Daily Californian
- The Press Democrat
- The Stanford Daily
- 5 McClatchy Media-owned newspapers:
  - Merced Sun-Star
  - The Fresno Bee
  - The Modesto Bee
  - The Sacramento Bee
  - The San Luis Obispo Tribune
Oppose

Executive branch officials

- Xavier Becerra, former secretary of health and human services (2021–2025) (D)
- Michael Boskin, former chair of the Council of Economic Advisers (1989–1993) (R)
- Richard Burkhauser, former member of the Council of Economic Advisers (2017–2019) (R)
- Michael Faulkender, former deputy secretary of the treasury (2025)
- David R. Henderson, former member of the Council of Economic Advisers (1982–1984)
- Douglas Holtz-Eakin, former director of the Congressional Budget Office (2003–2005) (R)
- Glenn Hubbard, former chair of the Council of Economic Advisers (2001–2003) (R)
- Joshua D. Rauh, former principal chief economist of the Council of Economic Advisers (2019–2020)
- David Sacks, co-chair of the President's Council of Advisors on Science and Technology (2025–present) (R)

U.S. senators

- Phil Gramm, Texas (1985–2002) (R)

U.S. representatives

- Vince Fong, CA-20 (2024–present) (R)
- Kevin Kiley, CA-03 (2023–present) (I) (Note: Kiley was elected as a Republican before registering as an independent in 2026.)
- Sam Liccardo, CA-16 (2025–present) (D)
- Katie Porter, former CA-47 (2019–2025) (D)
- David Valadao, CA-21 (2013–2019, 2021–2023) and CA-22 (2023–present) (R)

Statewide officials

- Josh Fryday, chief service officer of California (2019–present) (D)
- Eleni Kounalakis, lieutenant governor of California (2019–present) (D)
- Fiona Ma, treasurer of California (2019–present) (D)
- Gavin Newsom, governor of California (2019–present) (D)

State legislators

- Patrick Ahrens, AD-26 (2024–present) (D)
- David Alvarez, AD-80 (2022–present) (D)
- Toni Atkins, former senate president pro tempore (2018–2024) from SD-39 (2016–2024) (D)
- Anamarie Avila Farias, AD-15 (2024–present) (D)
- Josh Becker, SD-13 (2020–present) (D)
- Marc Berman, AD-23 (2016–present) (D)
- Catherine Blakespear, SD-38 (2022–present) (D)
- Christopher Cabaldon, SD-03 (2024–present) (D)
- Ian Calderon, former assembly majority leader (2016–2020) from AD-57 (2012–2020) (D)
- Lisa Calderon, AD-56 (2020–present) (D)
- Leticia Castillo, AD-58 (2024–present) (R)
- Phillip Chen, AD-59 (2016–present) (R)
- Laurie Davies, AD-74 (2020–present) (R)
- Carl DeMaio, AD-75 (2024–present) (R)
- Mike Gipson, AD-65 (2014–present) (D)
- John Harabedian, AD-41 (2024–present) (D)
- Gregg Hart, AD-37 (2022–present) (D)
- Robert Hertzberg, former senate majority leader (2019–2022) from SD-18 (2014–2022) (D)
- Jacqui Irwin, AD-42 (2014–present) (D)
- Corey Jackson, AD-60 (2022–present) (D)
- Jerry McNerney, SD-05 (2024–present) (D)
- Stephanie Nguyen, AD-10 (2022–present) (D)
- Blanca Pacheco, AD-64 (2022–present) (D)
- Sharon Quirk-Silva, AD-65 (2012–2014) and AD-67 (2016–present) (D)
- James Ramos, AD-45 (2018–present) (D)
- Michelle Rodriguez, AD-53 (2024–present) (D)
- Gloria Romero, former senate majority leader (2005–2008) from SD-24 (2001–2010) (R) (Note: Romero held office as a Democrat but switched her party affiliation to Republican in 2024.)
- Blanca Rubio, AD-48 (2016–present) (D)
- Pilar Schiavo, AD-40 (2022–present) (D)
- Kelly Seyarto, SD-32 (2022–present) (R)
- Catherine Stefani, AD-19 (2024–present) (D)
- Darrell Steinberg, former senate president pro tempore (2008–2014) from SD-06 (2006–2014) and mayor of Sacramento (2016–2024) (D)
- Henry Stern, SD-27 (2016–present) (D)
- Tony Strickland, SD-19 (2008–2012) and SD-36 (2025–present) (R)
- Tri Ta, AD-70 (2022–present) (R)
- Tom Umberg, SD-34 (2018–present) (D)
- Avelino Valencia, AD-68 (2022–present) (D)
- Greg Wallis, AD-47 (2022–present) (R)
- Scott Wiener, SD-11 (2016–present) (D) (previously neutral)

Local officials

- Karen Bass, mayor of Los Angeles (2022–present) (D)
- Chad Bianco, sheriff-coroner of Riverside County (2019–present) (R)
- Matt Dorsey, San Francisco supervisor from the 6th district (2022–present) (D)
- Mara Elliott, former city attorney of San Diego (2016–2024) (D) (previously supported)
- Daniel Lurie, mayor of San Francisco (2025–present) (D)
- Nathan Magsig, Fresno County supervisor from the 5th district (2017–present) (R)
- Matt Mahan, mayor of San Jose (2023–present) (D)
- Libby Schaaf, former mayor of Oakland (2015–2023) (D)
- Michael Tubbs, former mayor of Stockton (2017–2021) (D)
- Antonio Villaraigosa, former mayor of Los Angeles (2005–2013) (D)

Individuals

- Bill Ackman, hedge fund manager
- E.J. Antoni, economist
- Gustavo Arellano, Los Angeles Times columnist
- Brian Armstrong, CEO of Coinbase
- Robert Aumann, mathematician and Nobel laureate
- Sanjai Bhagat, economist
- Bruce Bialosky, columnist
- Donald J. Boudreaux, economist
- Sergey Brin, co-founder of Google
- Charles Calomiris, economist
- Rick Caruso, founder of Caruso (D)
- Ron Conway, venture capitalist (D)
- Mark Cuban, businessman (I)
- Ray Dalio, investor (I)
- Steven Davis, economist
- John Doerr, investor (D)
- Eugene Fama, economist and Nobel laureate
- Andy Fang, co-founder of DoorDash
- Steve Forbes, chairman of Forbes (R)
- Rene Haas, CEO of Arm Holdings
- Lars Peter Hansen, economist and Nobel laureate
- Thomas Hazlett, economist
- James Heckman, economist and Nobel laureate
- Magnus Henrekson, economist
- Steve Hilton, former director of strategy to the prime minister of the United Kingdom (2010–2012) (R)
- Reid Hoffman, co-founder of LinkedIn
- Matthew Kahn, economist
- Vinod Khosla, venture capitalist
- Wojciech Kopczuk, economist
- Arthur Laffer, economist
- Chris Larsen, business executive
- Stan Liebowitz, economist
- Palmer Luckey, co-founder of Anduril Industries
- Michael Marlow, economist
- Megan McArdle, columnist
- William L. Megginson, economist
- Jack Mintz, economist
- Stephen Moore, economist (R)
- Peter Morici, economist
- Michael Moritz, venture capitalist
- Dan Newman, political consultant
- Timothy Noah, journalist
- Lee Ohanian, economist
- Kevin O'Leary, businessman
- Larry Page, co-founder of Google
- Chamath Palihapitiya, entrepreneur (R)
- Joel Pollak, California Post opinion editor (R)
- Jesse Powell, co-founder of Kraken
- Carolyn Sapp Daniels, actress (R)
- Douglas Schoen, political consultant and commentator
- Michael R. Strain, economist (R)
- Daniel A. Sumner, economist
- Garry Tan, venture capitalist (D)
- Peter Thiel, co-founder of PayPal and Palantir (R)
- Mauricio Umansky, realtor and TV personality
- George Will, writer (I)

Labor unions

- Building and Construction Trades Council of California
- California Police Chiefs Association
- California Professional Firefighters
- California State Council of Laborers
- California Teachers Association
- Communications Workers of America District 9
- International Brotherhood of Electrical Workers Locals 11, 18, 40, 302, and 441
- International Union of Elevator Constructors Local 8
- International Union of Painters and Allied Trades District Council 16
- Ironworkers District Council of the State of California and Vicinity
- Los Angeles and Orange Counties Building and Construction Trades Council
- United Domestic Workers

Organizations

- Americans for Tax Reform
- Association of California School Administrators
- Bay Area Council
- Building Owners and Managers Association California
- California Association of Realtors
- California Chamber of Commerce
- California Children's Hospital Association
- California Dental Association
- California Farm Bureau
- California Hospital Association
- California Medical Association
- California Policy Center
- California ProLife Council
- California Republican Assembly
- California School Boards Association
- California Society of Certified Public Accountants
- California State Sheriffs Association
- California Taxpayers Association
- California YIMBY
- Cato Institute
- Citizens Against Government Waste
- Equality California
- GrowSF
- Howard Jarvis Taxpayers Association
- Indivisible Marin
- Los Angeles Area Chamber of Commerce
- National Action Network Sacramento
- National Association for the Advancement of Colored People California Hawaii State Conference
- National Federation of Independent Business
- Planned Parenthood Affiliates of California
- Reform California
- United Health Centers of San Joaquin Valley
- Western Growers Association
- 14 countywide Farm Bureau organizations (Note: Butte County; Contra Costa County; Fresno County; Humboldt County; Kern County; Lake County; Mendocino County; Monterey County; Napa County; Placer County; San Diego County; San Joaquin County; Shasta County; Sonoma County)

Political parties

- American Independent Party
- California Republican Party
- Libertarian Party of California
- San Francisco Democratic Party

Newspapers and media

- Alianza Metropolitan
- Bakersfield Observer
- Bay Area Reporter
- Beverly Press
- California Post
- Inland Empire Community News
- KFOX Radio Seoul
- KHTS Radio
- La Opinión
- Lake County Record-Bee
- Los Angeles Sentinel
- Los Angeles Times
- Los Angeles Wave
- National Review
- Oakland Post
- Palo Alto Daily Post
- Park La Brea News
- Pirate Wires
- San Diego Voice & Viewpoint
- San Fernando Valley Sun
- San Francisco Chronicle
- San Mateo Daily Journal
- Santa Barbara Independent
- Sing Tao Daily
- The Bakersfield Californian
- The Desert Review
- The Hemet & San Jacinto Chronicle
- The Wall Street Journal
- The Washington Post
- Washington Examiner
- 4 Bay Area News Group-owned newspapers:
  - East Bay Times
  - Marin Independent Journal
  - Santa Cruz Sentinel
  - The Mercury News
- 12 Southern California News Group-owned newspapers:
  - Daily Breeze
  - Inland Valley Daily Bulletin
  - Los Angeles Daily News
  - Orange County Register
  - Pasadena Star-News
  - Press-Telegram
  - Redlands Daily Facts
  - San Gabriel Valley Tribune
  - The Press-Enterprise
  - The San Bernardino Sun
  - The San Diego Union-Tribune (Note: Editorial board's own endorsement)
  - Whittier Daily News
Neutral/declined to endorse

U.S. senators

- Elizabeth Warren, Massachusetts (2013–present) (D)

Labor unions

- International Brotherhood of Electrical Workers Local 332
- Service Employees International Union California
- SEIU Locals 1021, 2015, 99, 1000, and 521

Organizations

- Friends Committee on Legislation of California
- League of Women Voters of California
- San Francisco Bay Area Planning and Urban Research Association

Government bodies

- Marin County Board of Supervisors
- Sacramento City Council

== Polling ==
Among likely voters (LV) only. View source data.

| Poll source | Date(s) administered | Sample size (Note: Key: A – all adults RV – registered voters LV – likely voters V – unclear) | Margin of error | Phrasing | Yes | No | Undecided |
|---|---|---|---|---|---|---|---|
| Berkeley IGS (Note: Poll sponsored by the Los Angeles Times.) | October 19–25, 2026 | 1477 (LV) | ±3.0% | (Note: Respondents were read the initiative's ballot title and summary. Those who had not yet voted were then asked: "If the election were held today, how would you vote on Proposition 40?", while those who had voted were asked: "How did you vote on Proposition 40?") | 42% | 50% | 8% |
| SurveyUSA (Note: Poll sponsored by KGTV and The San Diego Union-Tribune.) | October 19–24, 2026 | 799 (LV) | ±5.3% | (Note: "A YES vote on this measure means: The state would collect a one-time tax from billionaires equal to 5 percent of their wealth. A NO vote on this measure means: The state would not collect a one-time tax from billionaires equal to 5 percent of their wealth. If the election were held today and you were filling out your ballot right now, how would you vote on Proposition 40?") | 44% | 43% | 13% |
| McLaughlin & Associates (R) (Note: Poll sponsored by the California Post.) | October 17–20, 2026 | 800 (LV) | ±3.4% | – | 35% | 53% | 12% |
| Public Policy Institute of California | October 16–22, 2026 | 1086 (LV) | ±3.8% | (Note: "Proposition 40 is called "Imposes One-Time Tax on Certain Taxpayers. Initiative Constitutional Amendment and Statute." It imposes 5% tax on certain taxpayers with assets over $1 billion; revenue primarily for health care. Exempts revenues from constitutional requirements for school funding and spending limit. Fiscal impact: temporary revenue increase of tens of billions of dollars spread over several years from wealth tax on billionaires. Possible ongoing decrease of less than $1 billion per year in income tax revenue from billionaires. Supporters: US Senator Bernie Sanders; SEIU United Healthcare Workers West. Opponents: California Primary Care Association; California School Boards Association; California Taxpayers Association. If the election were held today, would you vote yes or no?") | 46% | 52% | 2% |
| TrueDot (Note: Poll sponsored by Politico and the UC Berkeley Citrin Center for Public Opinion Research.) | October 9–14, 2026 | 909 (LV) | ±3.6% | (Note: Respondents were read the initiative's ballot title and summary. Those who had not yet voted were then asked: "If the election were held today, how would you vote on this initiative?", while those who had voted were asked: "How did you vote on this initiative?") | 46% | 43% | 10% |
| Manhattan Institute (R) | September 24 – October 1, 2026 | 1000 (LV) | ±3.1% | (Note: "This November, Proposition 40 will appear on the ballot in California. If passed, the state would collect a one-time tax from billionaires equal to 5 percent of their wealth. If the election were held today, would you support or oppose Proposition 40?") | 35% | 50% | 15% |
| IVC Media (Note: Poll sponsored by the Independent Voter Project.) | September 23 – October 2, 2026 | 2906 (LV) | ±2.5% | (Note: Respondents were read the initiative's ballot title and summary. They were then given the Legislative Analyst's Office's estimate that Proposition 40 would raise tens of billions of dollars but could cost up to $1 billion a year in income tax revenue if wealthy residents leave California.) | 38% | 42% | 21% |
| Mason-Dixon Polling & Strategy (Note: Poll sponsored by NBCUniversal Local and Telemundo Station Group.) | September 21–24, 2026 | 625 (LV) | ±4.0% | (Note: Respondents were read the initiative's ballot title and summary.) | 48% | 38% | 14% |
| Berkeley IGS | September 15–20, 2026 | 4512 (LV) | ±2.0% | (Note: Respondents were read the initiative's ballot title and summary.) | 45% | 42% | 13% |
| SurveyUSA | September 15–20, 2026 | 742 (LV) | ±5.5% | (Note: "A YES vote on this measure means: The state would collect a one-time tax from billionaires equal to 5 percent of their wealth. A NO vote on this measure means: The state would not collect a one-time tax from billionaires equal to 5 percent of their wealth. If the election were held today and you were filling out your ballot right now, how would you vote on Proposition 40?") | 48% | 40% | 12% |
| TrueDot | September 8–14, 2026 | 2418 (RV) | ±2.7% | (Note: "If the election were held today, how would you vote on this initiative?") | 46% | 40% | 14% |
| TrueDot | September 8–14, 2026 | 1983 (LV) | ±3.0% | (Note: "If the election were held today, how would you vote on this initiative?") | 45% | 43% | 12% |
| Public Policy Institute of California | September 4–10, 2026 | 1097 (LV) | ±3.8% | (Note: "If the election were held today, would you vote yes or no?") | 52% | 46% | 2% |
| FM3 Research (D) (Note: Poll sponsored by No on Prop 40, a coalition that opposed the initiative.) | August 23–27, 2026 | 1250 (LV) | – | (Note: Respondents were read the initiative's ballot title and summary.) | 44% | 47% | 8% |
| Berkeley IGS | August 3–9, 2026 | 2310 (LV) | ±2.5% | (Note: Respondents were read the initiative's ballot title and summary.) | 48% | 41% | 11% |
| FM3 Research (D) (Note: Poll sponsored by No on Prop 40, a coalition that opposed the initiative.) | July 22–27, 2026 | 842 (LV) | – | (Note: Respondents were read the initiative's ballot title and summary.) | 46% | 47% | 7% |
| New River Strategies (Note: Poll sponsored by SEIU-UHW, the sponsor of the initiative.) | June 23–25, 2026 | 1553 (LV) | ±2.5% | – | 57% | 38% | 5% |
| Goodwin Simon Strategic Research (Note: Poll sponsored by the Blue Collar Coalition, a group funded by the California State Council of Laborers.) | June 10–15, 2026 | 607 (LV) | – | (Note: Respondents were read the initiative's ballot title and summary.) | 47% | 43% | 10% |
| Tulchin Research (D) (Note: Poll sponsored by Golden State Promise, a political action committee that opposed the initiative.) | June 8–14, 2026 | 1000 (LV) | ±3.1% | (Note: Respondents were read the initiative's ballot title and summary.) | 41% | 47% | 12% |
| Public Policy Institute of California | May 14–18, 2026 | 986 (LV) | ±4.1% | (Note: "A proposed citizens' initiative for the November 2026 state ballot is titled "Imposes One-Time Tax on Certain Individuals and Trusts. Initiative Constitutional Amendment." It imposes a one-time tax of up to 5% on taxpayers and trusts with covered assets valued over $1 billion; covered assets include businesses, securities, art, collectibles, and intellectual property, but exclude real property and some pensions and retirement accounts. It allocates 90% of these tax revenues for health care, 10% for food assistance or education-related programs; and prohibits using revenues to replace existing funding for these purposes. It exempts such tax revenues from constitutional requirements for school funding, budget reserves, and state spending limit. If the election were held today, would you vote yes or no?") | 54% | 45% | 1% |
| Berkeley IGS (Note: Poll sponsored by the Los Angeles Times.) | March 9–15, 2026 | 5109 (RV) | ±2.0% | (Note: "The Billionaire Tax initiative calls for imposing a one-time 5% state tax on the total wealth of any California resident whose net worth is greater than 1 billion dollars. Supporters say it will provide much needed tax revenues and help offset the cutbacks being made by the Trump administration to existing state health care and food assistance programs. Opponents say its passage would undercut state tax revenues in the long run and stifle innovation as many of California's highest paying taxpayers and most successful individuals may choose to leave the state to avoid the tax. If you were voting today on the Billionaire Tax Initiative, would you vote Yes or No?") | 52% | 33% | 15% |
| TrueDot | February 25 – March 3, 2026 | 1220 (RV) | ±3.0% | | 50% | 28% | 23% |
| The Mellman Group (D) (Note: Poll sponsored by Kensington Avenue Strategies, a Republican strategy firm.) | January 6–12, 2026 | 800 (LV) | ±3.0% | (Note: Respondents were read the initiative's ballot title and summary.) | 48% | 38% | 14% |
| Nestpoint | January 2–12, 2026 | 907 (LV) | ±3.0% | – | 60% | 24% | 16% |
| David Binder Research (D) (Note: Poll sponsored by Stop the Squeeze, a political action committee that opposed the initiative.) | December 6–10, 2025 | 800 (LV) | ±3.5% | (Note: "Do you support or oppose the Billionaire Tax Act, which would impose a one-time five percent tax on the accumulated net worth of individuals in California with a net worth of one billion dollars or more?") | 55% | 39% | 6% |

== Results ==
2026 California Proposition 40 99% reporting
| Choice | Votes | % |
|---|---|---|
| For | 6,277,656 | 47.93 |
| Against | 6,819,469 | 52.07 |
| Total | 13,097,125 | 100.00 |
| Registered voters/turnout | 23,273,590 | – |
Source: California Secretary of State

=== By county ===
| County | Yes | | No | | Ballots cast (Note: including invalid ballots) | Turnout |
| County | # | % | # | % | Ballots cast | Turnout |
|---|---|---|---|---|---|---|
| Alameda | 327,264 | 58.2 | 235,069 | 41.8 | 577,102 | 58.7% |
| Alpine | 254 | 42.8 | 339 | 57.2 | 616 | 67.2% |
| Amador | 4,565 | 24.6 | 13,997 | 75.4 | 19,182 | 71.1% |
| Butte | 30,534 | 39.0 | 47,783 | 61.0 | 80,470 | 63.1% |
| Calaveras | | | | | 21,936 | 67.0% |
| Colusa | 2,045 | 33.7 | 4,020 | 66.3 | 6,246 | 57.1% |
| Contra Costa | 212,074 | 47.9 | 230,571 | 52.1 | 454,074 | 61.9% |
| Del Norte | 3,092 | 37.8 | 5,090 | 62.2 | 8,543 | 56.4% |
| El Dorado | | | | | 96,727 | 70.1% |
| Fresno | 114,992 | 42.8 | 153,959 | 57.2 | 277,481 | 52.3% |
| Glenn | 2,475 | 29.1 | 6,044 | 70.9 | 8,767 | 61.6% |
| Humboldt | | | | | 54,246 | 62.8% |
| Imperial | 19,318 | 47.1 | 21,674 | 52.9 | 42,273 | 45.1% |
| Inyo | 2,858 | 39.1 | 4,452 | 60.9 | 7,636 | 69.9% |
| Kern | | | | | 237,528 | 51.0% |
| Kings | | | | | 35,031 | 57.3% |
| Lake | | | | | 21,227 | 55.8% |
| Lassen | 1,764 | 20.0 | 7,073 | 80.0 | 9,106 | 59.4% |
| Los Angeles | | | | | 3,182,571 | 53.8% |
| Madera | 17,746 | 37.8 | 29,170 | 62.2 | 47,938 | 57.3% |
| Marin | 58,643 | 47.5 | 64,913 | 52.5 | 128,525 | 73.9% |
| Mariposa | 2,402 | 30.8 | 5,389 | 69.2 | 7,999 | 67.8% |
| Mendocino | 16,548 | 50.9 | 15,956 | 49.1 | 33,363 | 61.8% |
| Merced | 33,738 | 46.1 | 39,406 | 53.9 | 75,576 | 55.0% |
| Modoc | 680 | 21.7 | 2,458 | 78.3 | 3,240 | 62.6% |
| Mono | | | | | 5,210 | 65.5% |
| Monterey | 66,239 | 53.4 | 57,728 | 46.6 | 127,970 | 58.1% |
| Napa | 25,384 | 46.2 | 29,528 | 53.8 | 56,668 | 65.5% |
| Nevada | | | | | 53,362 | 69.6% |
| Orange | 476,045 | 41.9 | 658,846 | 58.1 | 1,167,823 | 60.9% |
| Placer | | | | | 199,005 | 66.3% |
| Plumas | | | | | 8,588 | 66.6% |
| Riverside | | | | | 781,262 | 53.7% |
| Sacramento | | | | | 563,145 | 61.1% |
| San Benito | 10,591 | 45.7 | 12,563 | 54.3 | 23,634 | 59.0% |
| San Bernardino | | | | | 634,550 | 50.8% |
| San Diego | 581,466 | 47.3 | 647,368 | 52.7 | 1,261,233 | 62.1% |
| San Francisco | | | | | 352,939 | 65.8% |
| San Joaquin | 92,774 | 42.8 | 123,795 | 57.2 | 222,053 | 53.4% |
| San Luis Obispo | | | | | 128,818 | 70.1% |
| San Mateo | 131,369 | 47.8 | 143,464 | 52.2 | 283,061 | 63.0% |
| Santa Barbara | | | | | 160,329 | 64.2% |
| Santa Clara | | | | | 631,768 | 58.5% |
| Santa Cruz | | | | | 118,439 | 68.4% |
| Shasta | | | | | 67,753 | 58.5% |
| Sierra | 427 | 28.5 | 1,070 | 71.5 | 1,531 | 70.7% |
| Siskiyou | 5,544 | 33.0 | 11,269 | 67.0 | 17,514 | 63.3% |
| Solano | 71,036 | 45.8 | 84,170 | 54.2 | 158,750 | 57.5% |
| Sonoma | | | | | 224,682 | 70.0% |
| Stanislaus | 62,707 | 39.8 | 94,954 | 60.2 | 162,645 | 54.0% |
| Sutter | 10,496 | 33.9 | 20,477 | 66.1 | 32,150 | 58.2% |
| Tehama | 5,293 | 25.2 | 15,706 | 74.8 | 21,695 | 58.2% |
| Trinity | 1,723 | 37.2 | 2,913 | 62.8 | 4,787 | 63.0% |
| Tulare | | | | | 117,767 | 51.5% |
| Tuolumne | | | | | 24,209 | 67.7% |
| Ventura | | | | | 330,335 | 62.9% |
| Yolo | | | | | 82,511 | 67.1% |
| Yuba | | | | | 24,339 | 51.9% |
| Totals | 6,277,656 | 47.9 | 6,819,469 | 52.1 | 13,487,928 | 58.0% |

== Aftermath ==
At a press conference on election night before polls had closed, Dave Regan implied that he would reintroduce a version of Proposition 40 in 2028, though CalMatters noted that Proposition 42, which was approved by voters, would "prevent [the introduction of] a differently written asset tax." In a since-deleted tweet from November 4, SEIU-UHW stated that Proposition 40 "appears unlikely to pass". On November 6, Decision Desk HQ projected that the measure would fail. NBC News, CBS News, and the Associated Press called the race three days later, on November 9.

In a statement, SEIU-UHW chief of staff Suzanne Jimenez attributed the loss to a "deeply misleading and corrupt [opposition] campaign" funded by a "tiny group of the most controversial and wealthiest billionaires on the planet". The opposition campaign released a statement after Proposition 40's defeat, calling the proposed tax a "reckless experiment conducted on our state's economy with little regard for the harms it would cause".

== Notes ==
Partisan clients

Poll phrasing
