= Building a Better California =

American political advocacy organization

Building a Better California is an American political advocacy organization in California that describes itself as a nonpartisan 501(c)(4) nonprofit with an affiliated political action committee.

Building a Better California became publicly active in January 2026, primarily with financial backing from technology executives. The group has opposed Proposition 40, a proposed wealth tax on billionaires, and supported Propositions 42 and 41.

== History ==
Building a Better California was co-founded by technology executives Sergey Brin and Eric Schmidt, who are opposed to the billionaire tax, introduced two questions to the November 2026 ballot, which are designed to curb the effects of the billionaire tax if it passes. One, known as Proposition 41, would bar new taxes from circumventing rules on education spending requirements for tax revenue, while Proposition 42 would invalidate the billionaire tax by amending the state constitution to forbid retroactive taxation. Another measure that would have required more audits of special taxes and imposed more rules on how revenue could be spent did not qualify for the ballot.

By August 2026, Building a Better California had raised $118 million, primarily from Brin, Chris Larsen, and John Doerr.

== Campaign contributions ==
While the largest reported contributions went to campaigns opposing Proposition 40 and supporting Propositions 41 and 42, the organization also contributed to campaigns concerning housing and environmental review.

The California Fair Political Practices Commission's disclosures, last modified October 27, 2026, listed the following contributions:

Campaign	Issue	Reported contribution
No on Proposition 40	Opposition to the proposed billionaire wealth tax	$129,000,000
Yes on Proposition 41	State tax, spending-limit and audit requirements	$58,350,000
Yes on Proposition 42	Restrictions on new personal-property taxes and certain retroactive taxes	$145,800,000
Yes on Proposition 45	Changes to environmental-review requirements	$10,000,000
Yes on Proposition 37	Homebuyer assistance	$6,000,000
Yes on Proposition 1	Veterans and affordable housing bond	$1,000,000
