= Wealth tax =

Tax on an entity's holdings of assets

A wealth tax, also called a capital tax, equity tax, or net wealth tax, is a tax on an entity's holdings of assets or an entity's net worth. This includes the total value of personal assets, including cash, bank deposits, real estate, assets in insurance and pension plans, ownership of unincorporated businesses, financial securities, and personal trusts (a one-off levy on wealth is a capital levy).

Typically, wealth taxation involves excluding an individual's liabilities, such as mortgages and other debts, from their total assets. Accordingly, this type of taxation is often referred to as a net wealth tax. As of 2017, five of the 36 OECD countries had a personal wealth tax (down from 12 in 1990). Proponents argue that wealth taxes can reduce income inequality by making it harder for individuals to accumulate large amounts of wealth. Wealth taxes have been criticized because they reduce economic growth, disincentivize entrepreneurship, encourage capital flight, and raise little revenue despite their high administrative costs.

== OECD countries with a wealth tax ==
The Global Revenue Statistics Database presents a roster of countries with documented instances of wealth-tax revenue (the data is limited to 1965–2021). A total of eight countries (Austria, Denmark, Finland, Germany, the Netherlands, Norway, Sweden, and Switzerland) were known to have collected revenue through a wealth tax in 1965. In the ensuing decades, the number of countries reporting wealth tax revenue increased gradually. It reached its peak in 1995, with 12 countries (Austria, Denmark, Finland, France, Germany, Iceland, Italy, the Netherlands, Norway, Spain, Sweden, and Switzerland) reporting revenue generated from this form of taxation. As of 2021, five out of 36 OECD countries implement a wealth tax on individuals. The five countries are Colombia, France, Norway, Spain, and Switzerland.

== In practice ==
Many critics of wealth taxes claim that wealth taxes can have a negative economic effect, such as declines in GDP growth or job losses, though Saez and Zucman (2019) recommend wealth taxes. A portion of their analysis is discussed with Historical examples below.

There are jurisdictions of sovereign nation states that require declaration of the taxpayer's balance sheet (assets and liabilities), and from that ask for a tax on net worth (assets minus liabilities), as a percentage of the net worth, or a percentage of the net worth exceeding a certain level. Wealth taxes can be limited to natural persons or extended to cover legal persons, such as corporations. In 1990, about a dozen European countries had a wealth tax, but by 2019, all but four had eliminated the tax because of the difficulties and costs associated with both design and enforcement. Belgium, Norway, Spain, and Switzerland are the countries that raised revenue from net wealth taxes on individuals in 2019 with net wealth taxes accounting for 1.1% of overall tax revenues in Norway, 0.55% in Spain, and 3.6% in Switzerland for 2017.

According to an OECD study on wealth taxes, it is "difficult to firmly argue that wealth taxes would have negative effects on entrepreneurship. The magnitude of the effects of wealth taxes on entrepreneurship is also unclear". A 2022 study found that wealth taxes are most likely to be implemented in the aftermath of major economic recessions. In November 2024, G20 leaders agreed to "engage cooperatively to ensure that ultra-high-net-worth individuals are effectively taxed."

=== Example countries ===
==== Argentina ====
The official term for the wealth tax in Argentina is "Impuesto sobre los Bienes Personales". On 31 December 2021, Argentina's tax authorities published General Resolution 912/2021, which introduces new modifications to the country's wealth tax. The modifications made to the wealth tax in Argentina entail an augmentation of the non-taxable minimum to ARS 6,000,000. Moreover, residential real estate assets in which the owner's daily domicile is situated shall not be subject to taxation if their value is equal to or below ARS 30,000,000 (approx. US$138,000 at the April 2023 official exchange rate). Additionally, the taxation rate structure has been revised. Assets surpassing ARS 100,000,000 (approx. US$460,000 at April 2023 official exchange rate) will now be taxed at a rate of 1.50%, while those exceeding ARS 300,000,000 will be taxed at a rate of 1.75%.

Tax rates for assets held in Argentina
Total assets (ARS)		Tax on (1) (ARS)	Tax on excess (%)
Over (1)	Up to (inclusive)	Tax on (1) (ARS)	Tax on excess (%)
0	3,000,000	-	0.50
3,000,000	6,500,000	15,000	0.75
6,500,000	18,000,000	41,250	1.00
18,000,000	100,000,000	156,250	1.25
100,000,000	300,000,000	1,181,250	1.50
300,000,000	and over	4,181,250	1.75

Tax rates for assets held abroad (for tax residents)
Value of assets held in Argentina and abroad (ARS)		Tax rate (%)
Over	Up to (inclusive)	Tax rate (%)
0	3,000,000	0.70
3,000,000	6,500,000	1.20
6,500,000	18,000,000	1.80
18,000,000	and over	2.25

Before FY2021, for assets held within Argentina, the tax is progressive from 0.50% on assets above ARS 3,000,000 (approx. US$32,000 at April 2021 official exchange rate) to 1.25% on assets above ARS 18,000,000 (approx. US$193,000 at April 2021 official exchange rate). For assets held outside of Argentina, the tax is progressive from 0.70% on assets above ARS 3,000,000 to 2.25% on assets above ARS 18,000,000.

==== Belgium ====
The Act of 7 February 2018, which is effectively a "wealth tax", introduced an annual tax on securities accounts, imposing a 0.15% tax on financial instruments held in accounts with a value exceeding €500,000 per account holder. The first taxable period started on 10 March 2018 and ended (at the latest on) 30 September 2018, for which the tax had to be paid by 30 August 2019. The second taxable period runs from 1 October 2018 to 30 September 2019. In October 2019, the Belgian Constitutional Court issued a decision annulling this tax on securities accounts, with effect as of 1 October 2019.

Belgium reintroduced the annual tax on securities accounts law, with some modifications, in February 2021. The Belgian Parliament adopted the amended law on the tax on securities accounts, which took effect on 26 February 2021, with the first reference period ending on 30 September 2021. A solidarity tax of 0.15% is now applicable to securities accounts that reach or exceed €1,000,000, regardless of the number of account holders, and the tax amount is limited to 10% of the difference between the taxable base and the €1,000,000 threshold.

==== Bolivia ====
In December 2020, the Bolivian socialist government of President Luis Arce approved a wealth tax on resident and non-resident individuals with a net fortune exceeding 30 million Bolivianos. The tax is progressive, with tax rates ranging from 1.4% to 2.4%, and it applies to both domestic and foreign assets. The tax took effect in 2020.

==== Colombia ====
On 1 January 2019, the Senate passed a tax reform bill that includes a lower corporate tax rate, a new tax rate for financial corporations, and a new wealth tax. For the years 2019, 2020, and 2021, the new wealth (equity) tax has been set at 1% for Colombian-resident individuals' worldwide net worth, and 1% for non-resident individuals on Colombian properties only, such as real estate, yachts, artwork, vessels, ships, and other assets with a net equity of at least COP5 billion (US$1.5 million). Shares in Colombian firms, accounts receivable from Colombian debtors, some portfolio assets, and financial lease agreements are all exempt from the tax. Following the COVID-19 pandemic, the richest Colombians will face higher taxes on wages, dividends, and properties, as well as a one-time "solidarity levy" on high incomes. All of which is part of a new bill that was sent to Congress in April 2021. The bill aims to collect about 25 trillion pesos (US$6.9 billion) a year through new taxes and budget restraints, equating to 2.2 percent of GDP.

On 13 December 2022, the Colombian President Gustavo Petro enacted Law 2277 of 2022, which contains the tax reform proposals previously approved by Congress. A new wealth tax will be introduced as a permanent tax on individuals with net worth as of 1 January of the relevant tax year exceeding 72,000 UVT. This amount will be calculated as the aggregate value of assets owned (real estate, investments, vehicles, financial products, accounts with financial institutions, etc.) minus liabilities and debts. The tax will apply to the worldwide assets of resident individuals; nonresident individuals will be subject to wealth tax only on their Colombian assets. The tax rate is between 0 and 1,5% until 2026 and will be between 0 and 1% FY 2027 onwards.

Wealth progressive tax rates applicable for 2023, 2024, 2025, and 2026
Brackets in UVT		Progressive tax rate (%)	Tax
From	To	Progressive tax rate (%)	Tax
> 0	72,000	0.0	0
> 72,000	122,000	0.5	(Taxable wealth in UVT less than 72,000) x 0.5%
> 122,000	239,000	1.0	(Taxable wealth in UVT less than 122,000) x 1.0% + 250 UVT
> 239,000	upwards	1.5	(Taxable wealth in UVT less than 239,000) x 1.5% +1,420 UVT

Wealth progressive tax rates applicable from 2027
Brackets in UVT		Progressive tax rate (%)	Tax
From	To	Progressive tax rate (%)	Tax
> 0	72,000	0.0	0
> 72,000	122,000	0.5	(Taxable wealth in UVT less than 72,000) x 0.5%
> 122,000	239,000	1.0	(Taxable wealth in UVT less than 122,000) x 1.0% + 250 UVT

==== France ====
Since 2018, France has had a wealth tax on real estate (impôt sur la fortune immobilière, IFI). It is payable by individuals who own real estate assets with a combined value exceeding €1,300,000. French residents with global assets and non-residents who own French real estate may be liable for IFI. For French residents, the figure is calculated across all global real estate assets; for non-residents, it is calculated based on the total value of French property and real estate assets only. From 1989 to 2017, France had the solidarity tax on wealth (impôt de solidarité sur la fortune, ISF), an annual progressive wealth tax on any net assets above €800,000 for those with total net worth of €1,300,000 or more. Marginal rates ranged from 0.5% to 1.5%. In 2007, it collected €4.07 billion, accounting for 1.4% of total revenue.

==== Italy ====
Two types of wealth taxes are imposed in Italy.

- "Imposta sul valore degli immobili situati all'estero" (IVIE) is a 0.76% tax on real property located outside Italy. The purchase price or current market value determines the value of such assets. Property taxes paid in the country where the real estate exists can offset IVIE. For real estate owned in a European Union (EU) member state and in a country that is a member of the European Economic Area (EEA) that has an exchange of information agreement with Italy, the wealth tax is based on the cadastral value in force in the foreign country. In instances where there is no cadastral value, the wealth tax is based on the property's purchase cost or the market value in force at the property's location. No IVIE is due if the tax is lower than EUR 200; otherwise, the entire IVIE amount is due. If the real estate properties are subject to property tax in the country where they are located, the individual can deduct the amount paid from the tax due on the Italian tax return.
- Another tax, "Imposta sul valore delle Attivita' Finanziarie detenute all' Estero" or "IVAFE", is 0.20% and is levied on all financial assets located outside the country, including, so far as the language seems to imply, individual pension schemes such as 401(k)s and IRAs in the US.

==== New Zealand ====
No general wealth tax, however FIF/FDR (Foreign Investment Fund regime with Fair Dividend Rate calculation) is de facto a wealth tax on overseas investments. Under FDR calculation method, the default and most common, taxable income is deemed to be 5% of the opening market value of the overseas portfolio in a given tax year, regardless of actual dividends or capital gains. At the top marginal income tax rate of 39%, this is effectively a 1.95% annual wealth tax on the affected assets. Corporate entities (including funds) are generally required to apply FIF/FDR. Individuals are subject to FIF once the total cost basis of their overseas portfolio exceeds NZ$50,000 and they may elect to alternatively apply Comparative Value (CV) calculation that factors in dividends, realized and unrealized capital gains during the tax year.

==== Netherlands ====
Savings and investments in the Netherlands are taxed under Box 3 of the income tax, called vermogensrendementheffing (wealth yield tax). Although its name suggests that it is a tax on the yield of wealth, it is de facto a wealth tax, since the actual yield (whether positive or negative) is not taken into account in its calculation. Until 2016, the deemed yield was fixed at 4%, taxed at 30%, giving an effective rate of 1.2% on net assets. From 2017, category-differentiated deemed rates replaced the flat figure: in 2025, the Belastingdienst calculates Box 3 income using deemed yields of 1.37% for bank balances, 5.88% for investments and other assets, 2.70% for debts; tax rate is fixed at 36% with a tax-free allowance of €57,684 per person. See Income tax in the Netherlands.

In the Kerstarrest of 24 December 2021, the Supreme Court of the Netherlands held that the deemed-yield taxation in Box 3 breached the European Convention on Human Rights. Follow-up legislation, Wet rechtsherstel box 3 (2022) and Overbruggingswet box 3 (2023) were likewise found in breach on 6 June 2024. The Wet tegenbewijsregeling box 3, in force from 19 July 2025, allows eligible taxpayers to report actual yields for 2017–2024 and obtain a reduction where these fell below the deemed yield. To replace the deemed-yield regime, the Wet werkelijk rendement box 3 was submitted to parliament in May 2025, with intended entry into force on 1 January 2028. Under it, most assets would be taxed annually on actual income plus unrealized capital gains (vermogensaanwasbelasting), with real estate and start-up shares taxed only upon actual sale (vermogenswinstbelasting).

In addition to the vermogensrendementheffing, owners of real estate pay a tax called onroerendezaakbelasting, which is based on the estimated value of the real estate they own. This is a local tax, levied by the city council where the property is located.

==== Norway ====
0.7% (municipal) and 0.15% (national), a total of 0.85% levied on net assets exceeding 1,760,000 kr (approx. US$199,000) as of 2019. For tax purposes, the value of the primary residence is valued to 25% of the market value, secondary residences to 90% of the market value, while working capital such as commercial real estate, stocks, and stock funds are valued at various percentages. The Conservative Party, Progress Party and the Liberal Party have stated that they aim to reduce and eventually eliminate the wealth tax.

==== Spain ====
There is a tax called Patrimonio. The tax rate is progressive, from 0.2 to 3.75% of net assets above the threshold of €700,000 after a €300,000 primary residence allowance. The exact amount varies between regions.

==== Switzerland ====
A progressive wealth tax that varies by residence location. Most cantons have no wealth tax for individual net worth less than SFr 100,000 (approx. US$100,000) and progressively raise the tax rate on net assets with a top rate ranging from 0.13% to 0.94% depending on canton and municipality of residence. Wealth tax is levied against worldwide assets of Swiss residents, but it is not levied against assets in Switzerland held by non-residents. Swiss wealth tax is regulated on a cantonal basis. All cantons levy a net wealth tax on the balance of worldwide gross assets minus debts, and tax rates vary by taxpayer residency, with maximum rates ranging from around 0.13% to 1.1%.

In addition to cantonal wealth taxes, non-working Swiss residents are subject to mandatory AHV/AVS contributions that scale with one's net worth (plus any annual pension-like income multiplied by a factor of 20x) with a maximum cap. Residents married to a working spouse that pays at least twice the minimum contribution (SFr 1,060) are exempt. As of 2025, contribution amounts vary from SFr 530 (at net worth below SFr 600,000) up to a maximum of SFr 26,500 per year (at net worth of SFr 8,950,000 and above), thus equivalent to up to 0.3% extra wealth tax.

=== Historical examples ===
Ancient Athens had a wealth tax called eisphora (see symmoria), and a wealth registry consisting of self-assessments (τίμημα), limited to the wealthiest. The registry was not very accurate. The religion of Islam has a concept sometimes described as a wealth tax called Zakat.

In the seventeenth century, the Northern colonies in British America—from New Hampshire to Pennsylvania—taxed wealth—all assets including financial assets (stocks, bonds, loan instruments), livestock, inventories, ships, and jewelry.

Similar to Iceland, Denmark taxed household income above a certain exemption threshold, which was about the 98th percentile of the wealth distribution, until 1997. A dozen OECD countries imposed similar taxes until the 1990s, but the Danish wealth tax was the highest among them. Until the late 1980s, the marginal tax rate on wealth was 2.2 percent, resulting in a very high rate on wealth returns. After several years of minimizing the tax, the Danish government abolished it altogether in 1997. Some other European countries have discontinued this kind of tax in recent years: Germany (1997), Finland (2006), Luxembourg (2006) and Sweden (2007). In the United Kingdom and other countries, property (real estate) is often a person's main asset, and has been taxed – for example, the window tax of 1696, the rates, to some extent the Council Tax.

=== Proposed examples ===
==== Germany ====
To bridge the wealth gap between rich and poor in Germany, the Social Democratic Party of Germany called for reintroducing a nationwide wealth tax in 2019. According to the proposed tax reform, wealthy households would be required to pay an extra tax between 1% and 1.5%. A single household would need to pay 1% of its net worth on every euro exceeding €2 Million, and a married couple would have to pay 1% of their net worth on every euro exceeding €4 Million. A married household with a combined net worth of €4.2 Million would have to pay an annual wealth tax of €2,000. The proposal was eventually vetoed by the CDU/CSU and was therefore never considered again.

==== California ====
In October 2025, the Service Employees International Union–United Healthcare Workers West (SEIU-UHW) filed a California ballot initiative known as the 2026 Billionaire Tax Act (Initiative No. 25-0024), which would impose a one-time 5% tax on the net worth of California residents with wealth exceeding $1 billion. The initiative was drafted by Brian Galle and Emmanuel Saez of the University of California, Berkeley, David Gamage of the University of Missouri, and Darien Shanske of the University of California, Davis.

The California Legislative Analyst's Office estimated the tax would collect tens of billions of dollars beginning in 2027, but noted that some billionaires would likely leave the state, reducing ongoing income tax revenues. The Tax Foundation argued that the effective tax rate could exceed 5% for some taxpayers due to provisions related to dual-class share structures. The proposal drew opposition from California Governor Gavin Newsom and generated public debate, including a small pro-billionaire protest march in San Francisco in February 2026. In December 2025, Google founders Larry Page and Sergey Brin, worth a combined $520 billion, terminated or moved out of California 60 limited liability companies that hold their assets.

== Revenue ==
Revenue from a wealth tax scheme depends largely on the presence of net wealth and wealth inequality within the target country. Revenue depends on the plan in place, but it can generally be modeled as $R = t\times w$, where t represents the tax rate, and w is the amount of wealth affected by that tax rate. Many plans include tax brackets, where a certain portion of the individual's wealth will be taxed at a given rate and any wealth beyond that amount will be taxed at a different rate. A small number of countries have been using wealth tax regimes for some time. Revenues earned from wealth tax schemes vary by country from 0.98% of GDP in Switzerland to 0.22% in France, for example. 2020 United States presidential candidate Elizabeth Warren claimed a wealth tax plan could generate 1.4% of GDP in revenue for the United States.

According to data from the Organisation for Economic Co-operation and Development (OECD), wealth taxes accounted for about 0.46% of total tax revenue on average in 2018 in countries with wealth tax schemes. However, this varies from country to country; the highest is that of Luxembourg, at 7.18% of total tax revenue in 2018, and the lowest is Germany, at 0.03% of total tax revenue in 2018.

Wealth tax revenue percentages by country (USD, billions) in 2022
Country	Total tax revenue	Recurrent taxes on net wealth as % of revenue
Colombia	67.788	0.025%
Italy	879.161	0.053%
Turkey	188.426	0.001%
Luxembourg	31.448	7.032%
Switzerland	220	5.176%
Norway	256.732	1.396%
Spain	531.233	0.512%
Belgium	245.157	0.47%
Hungary	59.294	0.339%
France	1280.545	0.192%
Canada	710.527	0.058%
Germany	1602.874	0.109%

Estimates for a wealth tax's potential revenue in the United States vary. Several Democratic presidential candidates in the 2020 election have proposed wealth tax plans. Elizabeth Warren, for example, has proposed a wealth tax of 2% on net wealth above $50 million and 6% above $1 billion. The conservative-leaning nonprofit Tax Foundation estimates revenue generated by Senator Warren's proposal would total around $2.6 trillion over the next 10 years. Separate estimates from campaign advisors and economists Emmanuel Saez and Gabriel Zucman put the revenue at about 1% of GDP per year, in alignment with USD revenue estimates.

These estimates put Senator Warren's tax plan revenues at about $200 billion in 2020. The sum of United States tax revenues in 2018 were $5 trillion in 2018, meaning the tax collected by this plan would be equal to 4% of current tax revenues. Additionally, the Tax Foundation estimates 2020 presidential candidate Senator Bernie Sanders' wealth tax plan would collect $3.2 trillion between 2020 and 2029. Previous proposals for a wealth tax in the United States had already existed. Eileen Myles proposed a net assets tax in her presidential campaign in 1992, as did Donald Trump during his presidential campaign in 2000.

== Effect on investment ==
According to University of Pennsylvania Law School professors David Shakow and Reed Shuldiner, "a wealth tax also taxes capital that is not productively employed. Thus, a wealth tax can be viewed as a tax on potential income from capital." Net wealth taxes can complement rather than replace gift taxes, capital gains taxes, and inheritance taxes to increase administrability and the effectiveness of enforcement efforts. In their article, "Investment Effects of Wealth Taxes Under Uncertainty and Irreversibility", Rainer Niemann and Caren Sureth-Sloane found that the effects of wealth taxation on investment mainly depend upon the tax method employed and the broadness of the wealth threshold for taxation. Niemann and Sureth-Sloane found that, "Broadening the wealth tax base tends to accelerate investment during high interest rate periods." Caren Sureth and Ralf Maiterth concluded that wealth tax revenues from entrepreneurs may decrease in the long term, and the revenue from a wealth tax may be negative if the wealth taxation thresholds are too low.

Saez and Zucman are two economists that worked on the "Ultra-Millionaire Tax" proposed by Senator Elizabeth Warren. In their paper, "Progressive Wealth Taxation", they assert that a potential wealth tax in the United States needs necessary parameters to limit detrimental effects on investment.

Second, low exemption thresholds caused liquidity problems for some individuals at the lower end of the wealth-tax thresholds. Third, they contend European wealth taxes need modernization and improved methods for systematic information gathering. Saez and Zucman have also argued that a wealth tax with a high threshold would primarily target individuals with substantial liquid assets, thereby circumventing the liquidity problem for small- and medium-sized businesses and less-wealthy individuals. Moreover, they argue that such a tax would not necessarily reduce innovation, since innovation is largely driven by young people who have not yet amassed large fortunes. This must be seen in the context that most of the wealthiest people in the US are older than average. Additionally, they argue that large, established businesses use some of their wealth to maintain market power, thereby reducing innovation and competition.

A wealth tax with a high tax payable threshold could potentially increase innovation. Further proponents for a wealth tax claim it could have positive effects on investment in the United States. Some extremely wealthy people use their assets in unproductive ways. For example, an entrepreneur could generate much higher returns (though could conversely lose much more capital operating on leverage) than a wealthy individual with a conservative investment such as United States Treasury Bonds. A wealth tax could have adverse effects on investment, saving, and economic growth. In the article, "Economic effects of wealth taxation," Kyle Pomerleau states, "A wealth tax, even levied at an apparently low annual rate, places a significant burden on saving." The degree of this impact on savings and investments is reliant on the openness of the United States economy. A wealth tax would shrink national savings and increase foreign ownership of assets. The potential decrease in national savings leads to a decrease in capital stock. An estimate from the Penn Wharton Budget Model indicates that if the revenue from the wealth tax proposed by Elizabeth Warren were used to finance non-productive government spending, GDP would decrease by 2.1 percent by 2050, capital stock by 6.5 percent, and wages by 2.3 percent. Some opponents also point out that redistribution through a wealth tax is an inherently counterintuitive way to foster economic growth. Richard Epstein, a senior fellow at the Hoover Institution, contends, "The classical liberal approach wants to simplify taxation and reduce regulation to spur growth. Plain old growth is a much better social tonic than the toxic Warren Wealth Tax."

== Criticisms ==
There are many arguments against the implementation of a wealth tax, including claims that a wealth tax would be unconstitutional (in the United States), that property would be too hard to value, and that wealth taxes would reduce the rate of innovation.

=== Capital flight ===
A 2006 article in The Washington Post titled "Old Money, New Money Flee France and Its Wealth Tax" pointed out some of the harm caused by France's wealth tax. The article gave examples of how the tax caused capital flight, brain drain, job losses, and, ultimately, a net loss of tax revenue. Among other things, the article stated, "Éric Pichet, author of a French tax guide, estimates the wealth tax earns the government about $2.6 billion a year but has cost the country more than $125 billion in capital flight since 1998." In fact, the wealth tax named "Impôt sur les Grandes Fortunes" (IGF) ["tax on great wealth"] had been created in 1980, then suppressed in 1986 before finally being reintroduced in 1988 under the name "Impôt de Solidarité sur la Fortune" (ISF) (solidarity tax on wealth). In 1999, a new higher tax category was added, which increased the money collected from 0.09% of GDP in 1990 to 0.16% in 2004. For example, in 2003, 370 ISFs' accountable people left France, and the number continued to grow year by year, except between 2010 and 2011, when the tax threshold was raised, and accountable people were excluded. Capital flight only decreased after 2015, and in 2017, the French government announced it would abolish the tax. After the reforms were implemented, there were only 163 departures of wealth-tax payers in 2018.

Capital flight was one of the arguments for reforming the wealth tax. In 2018, the financial law introduced a new wealth tax along with other tax reforms. The fiscal reform thus included a unique forfeit tax on savings, the replacement of ISF with the "Impôt sur la Fortune Immobilière" (IFI), which reduced the wealth tax to real estate only, and a decrease in the corporate tax. This argument of capital flight takes its roots in an economic theory, the runoff theory. By decreasing the wealth tax, wealthy households are expected to return to the country to invest, thereby raising GDP growth and benefiting the entire population by reducing unemployment and boosting the economy. In France, the fiscal reform did not have the expected runoff effects. Capital flight by wealth-tax households accounted for only 0.3% and 0.5% of the total amount of money collected by the solidarity tax on wealth between 2004 and 2015. On the other hand, this decrease in the wealth tax resulted in a loss of 2.9 billion in state income.

There were fewer real estate investments by people subject to the wealth tax. However, this movement could be explained more by the increase in household income, the low level of interest rates on mortgage loans and the general dynamics of the real estate market than by a sale, on the part of wealthy households, of property subject to the IFI for the benefit of investments in transferable securities, therefore the result in investment on corporate are not significant. Moreover, the fiscal reform of the wealth tax had an insignificant effect on corporate funds at the macroeconomic level. For example, in 2020, for the non-financial sector, the share of listed and non-listed shares was lower than the average of the previous period, 2001–2019. It is also hard to measure the effect on corporate investment because of the COVID-19 crisis, which caused an economic shutdown in 2020.

=== Valuation issues ===
In 2012, the Wall Street Journal wrote that: "the wealth tax has a fatal flaw: valuation. It has been estimated that 62% of the wealth of the top 1% is "non-financial" – i.e., vehicles, real estate, and (most importantly) private business. Private businesses account for nearly 40% of their wealth and are the largest single category." A particular issue for small business owners is that they cannot accurately value their private business until it is sold. Furthermore, business owners could easily make their businesses look much less valuable than they really are, through accounting, valuations, and assumptions about the future. "Even the rich don't know exactly what they're worth in any given moment."

Examples of such fraud and malfeasance were revealed in 2013, when French budget minister Jérôme Cahuzac was discovered to have shifted financial assets into Swiss bank accounts to avoid the wealth tax. After further investigation, a French finance ministry official said, "A number of government officials minimised their wealth, by negligence or with intent, but without exceeding 5–10 per cent of their real worth ... however, there are some who have deliberately tried to deceive the authorities." Yet again, in October 2014, France's Finance chairman and President of the National Assembly, Gilles Carrez, was found to have avoided paying the French wealth tax (ISF) for three years by applying a 30 percent tax allowance on one of his homes. However, he had previously converted the home into an SCI, a private limited company for rental purposes. The 30 percent allowance does not apply to SCI holdings. Once this was revealed, Carrez declared, "If the tax authorities think that I should pay the wealth tax, I won't argue." Carrez is one of more than 60 French parliamentarians battling with the tax offices over 'dodgy' asset declarations.

Moreover, this problem of wealth devaluation is undermined by the administration itself. For example, in 1999, the French government introduced the notion of "the measured application of the tax law". But this application of the law is mostly reserved for the self-declared tax, like the wealth tax. It means that if there is fraud in the declaration, there will be no sanction if the household concerned corrects its mistake, even if it was intentional. This flexibility granted to self-declared taxes is indeed unequal. In fact, the other tax that concerns most households, like income taxes, cannot be self-declared, and this flexibility benefits only the richer households. More broadly, this self-declaration tax has led to what the sociologist Alexis Spire called "tax law domestication", which enables the richest segment of the population to employ fiscal specialists to optimize their declarations and minimize the amount of wealth tax owed. Once again, this creates an opportunity for optimization, as the flexibility in sanctions is unequally distributed across the tax spectrum and, by extension, across different parts of the population.

=== Social effects ===
Opponents of wealth taxes have argued that there is "an undercurrent of envy in the campaign against extremes of wealth." Two Yale University/London School of Economics studies (2006, 2008) on relative income yielded results asserting that 50 percent of the public would prefer to earn less money, as long as they earned as much or more than their neighbor. Many analysts and scholars assert that since wealth taxes are a form of direct asset collection, as well as double-taxation, they are antithetical to personal freedom and individual liberty. They further contend that free nations should have no business arbitrarily helping themselves to the personal belongings of any group of their citizens. Further, these opponents may say wealth taxes place the authority of the government ahead of the rights of the individual, and ultimately undermine the concept of personal sovereignty. The Daily Telegraph editor Allister Heath critically described wealth taxes as Marxian in concept and ethically destructive to the values of democracies, "Taxing already acquired property drastically alters the relationship between citizen and state: we become leaseholders, rather than freeholders, with accumulated taxes over long periods of time eventually "returning" our wealth to the state. It breaches a key principle that has made this country great: the gradual expansion of property ownership and the democratisation of wealth."

== Past repeals ==
In 2004, a study by the Institut de l'enterprise investigated why several European countries were eliminating wealth taxes and made the following observations: (1) wealth taxes contributed to capital drain, promoting the flight of capital as well as discouraging investors from coming in; (2) wealth taxes had high management cost and relatively low returns; and (3) wealth taxes distorted resource allocation, particularly involving certain exemptions and unequal valuation of assets. In its summary, the institute found that the "wealth taxes were not as equitable as they appeared".

In a 2011 study, the London School of Economics examined wealth taxes that the Labour Party in the United Kingdom considered between 1974 and 1976 but ultimately abandoned. The findings of the study revealed that the British evaluated similar programs in other countries and determined that the Spanish wealth tax may have contributed to a banking crisis, and that the French wealth tax was under review by its government for being unpopular and overly complex. As efforts progressed, concerns grew about the practicality and implementation of wealth taxes, as well as worries that they would undermine confidence in the British economy. Eventually, plans were dropped. Former British Chancellor Denis Healey concluded that attempting to implement wealth taxes was a mistake: "We had committed ourselves to a Wealth Tax, but in five years I found it impossible to draft one which would yield enough revenue to be worth the administrative cost and political hassle." The conclusion of the study stated that there were lingering questions, such as the impacts on personal saving and small business investment, the consequences of capital flight, the complexity of implementation, and the ability to raise the predicted revenues, that must be adequately addressed before further consideration of wealth taxes.

== Legal impediments ==
=== United States ===
==== Federal ====
In part because a wealth tax has never been implemented in the United States, there is no legal consensus about its constitutionality. Much scholarly debate on the topic hinges on whether or not such a tax is understood to be a "direct tax". Article 1, Section 9, Clause 4 of the United States Constitution requires that the burden of direct taxes be apportioned across the states by their population. Barry L. Isaacs interprets current case law in the United States to hold that a wealth tax is a direct tax. Given the extreme difficulty of apportioning a wealth tax by state population, the implementation of a wealth tax in the United States would require either a constitutional amendment or the overturning of current case law.

Other legal scholars have argued that a wealth tax is not a direct tax and that it could be implemented in the United States without a constitutional amendment. In a lengthy 2018 essay, authors in the Indiana Journal of Law argued that "the belief that the U.S. Constitution effectively makes a national wealth tax impossible ... is wrong." The authors noted that in the 1796 Supreme Court decision for Hylton v. United States, Supreme Court justices who had personally taken part in the creation of the U.S. Constitution "unanimously rejected a challenge to the constitutionality of an annual tax on carriages, a tax akin to a national wealth tax in that it taxed a luxury property." Alexander Hamilton, who supported the carriage tax, told the Supreme Court that it was constitutional because it was an "excise tax", not a direct tax. Hamilton's brief defines direct taxes as "Capitation or poll taxes, taxes on lands and buildings, general assessments, whether on the whole property of individuals or on their whole real or personal estate" which would include the wealth tax.

The 1895 US Supreme Court decision Pollock v. Farmers' Loan & Trust Co. found that income tax is an unapportioned direct tax, and thus unconstitutional. This decision was reversed by the Sixteenth Amendment to the United States Constitution, which allowed Congress to collect income taxes without regard to apportionment. Some tax scholars have framed a wealth tax as a tax on previous income, and thus not required to be apportioned. Some scholars have argued that a wealth tax would fit into the Sixteenth Amendment's definition of an income tax because the only difference is an administrative convention about when income is "realized" and taxable. Others argue the opposite. The question of when income is "realized" and when it is constitutional to tax was considered by the Supreme Court in Moore v. United States (2024), but in that case it explicitly avoided deciding how these rules apply to a hypothetical wealth tax. In another potential precedent, the 2012 US Supreme Court case National Federation of Independent Business v. Sebelius found the Obamacare individual mandate to buy health insurance, enforced as part of income tax filing, was not a direct tax.

To prevent capital flight, proponents of wealth taxes have argued for a one-time exit tax on high-net-worth individuals who renounce their citizenship and leave the country.

An additional constitutional objection to such a tax could be raised on the grounds that it violates the takings clause of the Fifth Amendment, which prohibits the federal government from taking private property for public use without just compensation.

UC Berkeley law professor Brian Galle proposes that one way to work around the constitutional limitation would be to remove the financial incentive behind the buy, borrow, die tax avoidance technique. Wealthy people can avoid realizing income (and thus the income tax) during their lifetime by borrowing against stock holdings that have grown tremendously in value rather than selling them. The stepped-up basis rule allows their heirs to avoid paying income taxes on the gains of their ancestors. Eliminating stepped-up basis would require heirs to pay income taxes, which might encourage more wealthy people to realize gains while alive, effectively subjecting more wealth to taxation.

==== State and local ====
Unlike federal wealth taxes, states and localities are not bound by Article 1, Section 9, which is why they can levy taxes on real estate. Some state constitutions have provisions which prohibit a wealth tax or the effect of which is disputed.

The 1897 US Supreme Court decision Chicago, Burlington & Quincy Railroad Co. v. City of Chicago ruled that that the Fourteenth Amendment to the United States Constitution had extended the Takings Clause requirement to the states, so arguments based on that part of the federal constitution also concern state's ability to enact wealth taxes.

In 2023, Texas voters approved a constitutional amendment prohibiting state lawmakers from imposing a wealth tax.

=== Germany ===
The Federal Constitutional Court of Germany in Karlsruhe found that wealth taxes "would need to be confiscatory in order to bring about any real redistribution". In addition, the court held that the combined amount of wealth tax and income tax should not exceed half of a taxpayer's income. "The tax thus gives rise to a dilemma: either it is ineffective in fighting inequalities, or it is confiscatory – and it is for that reason that the Germans chose to eliminate it." Thus, the Germans found such wealth taxes unconstitutional in 1995. In 2006, the Constitutional Court revised this decision on the "Halbteilungsgrundsatz", stating that "From the property guarantee of the Basic Law, no generally binding absolute upper limit of taxation in the vicinity of a half division can be derived."

== Proponents ==
In 2014, French economist Thomas Piketty published Capital in the Twenty-First Century in which he proposes a global system of progressive wealth taxes to help reduce inequality. His analysis was hailed as an important work by some economists, while others challenged his proposals and interpretations.

== Opponents ==
Swedish economist Magnus Henrekson recommends against wealth taxes, saying that Sweden abolished its almost century old wealth tax in 2007. The Swedes found that rich people's wealth is usually paper wealth ownership of companies they started, and taxing this incentivizes them to start, move, or grow their companies elsewhere; it was very difficult to apply because valuing assets when they are not sold is difficult, and, in Sweden, it never generated much revenue (0.3% of total tax revenue in 2006). He instead recommends broad income and consumption taxes without loopholes.

== See also ==
- Ad valorem tax
- Capital levy (a one-off wealth tax)
- Economic inequality#Environment; addressing human overpopulation having similar effects to decrease wealth gap
- Endowment tax
- Global minimum tax on billionaires
- Inheritance tax
- Land value tax
- Panama Papers
- Paradise Papers
- Progressive tax
- Property tax
- Redistribution of income and wealth
- Tax exporting
- Wealth concentration
- Wealth inequality in the United States
- Welfare state
- World taxation system
- Zakat
