= Daniel Sumner =

Daniel Sumner may refer to:

- Daniel H. Sumner (1837–1903), Wisconsin politician
- Daniel A. Sumner, American economist
