= March for Billionaires =

2026 pro-billionaire protest in San Francisco

- Date: February 7, 2026
- Location: San Francisco, California, United States
- Caused by: Opposition to the proposed 2026 California billionaire tax
- Goals: Protest the proposed California wealth tax; express support for billionaires' contributions to society
- Methods: March and rally

Parties
March organizers and supporters	Counter-protesters

Number
Approximately 20	Approximately one dozen

The March for Billionaires was a protest march held on February 7, 2026, in San Francisco, California. The march was held in support of billionaires and in opposition to the proposed 2026 billionaire tax, a California ballot initiative that would impose a one-time 5% wealth tax on the state's billionaires. The event drew extensive media coverage and public confusion over whether it was satire.

== Background ==
=== 2026 Billionaire Tax Act ===
The 2026 Billionaire Tax Act (Initiative No. 25-0024) is a proposed California ballot initiative that would impose a one-time 5% tax on the total net worth of California residents with wealth exceeding $1 billion. The measure was filed with the California Attorney General in October 2025, and its official title and summary were issued on December 26, 2025, clearing the way for signature collection. The initiative is backed by the SEIU United Healthcare Workers West.

Under the proposal, revenues would be allocated 90% to healthcare services and 10% to education and food assistance programs. The California Legislative Analyst's Office estimated the tax would collect tens of billions of dollars spread over several years beginning in 2027, but noted that the exact amount was difficult to predict. The LAO also noted that some billionaires would likely leave the state, reducing ongoing income tax revenues by "hundreds of millions of dollars or more per year".

The initiative drew opposition from California governor Gavin Newsom, who stated he was working to block the measure from reaching the ballot. The Tax Foundation published an analysis arguing that the actual effective tax rate could be higher than 5% for some taxpayers due to provisions related to dual-class share structures.

=== Organization ===
The march was organized by Derik Kauffman, co-founder of an artificial intelligence startup that had previously participated in Y Combinator's accelerator program. Kauffman had left RunRL by the time of the march. He told the San Francisco Examiner that he was not a billionaire, was not receiving funding from billionaires, and was paying for the march's website himself.

Kauffman said he was motivated both by opposition to the proposed wealth tax and by a desire to push back against what he saw as unfair vilification of billionaires as a class. He told TechCrunch that the tax was "fatally flawed" because it would force startup founders to liquidate shares, give up corporate control, and face disproportionate tax bills based on paper wealth.

A website and social media accounts for the event appeared in late January 2026, prompting speculation online that the march was a parody. The event's website used the slogan "Vilifying billionaires is popular. Losing them is expensive."

== Event ==
The march began at Alta Plaza Park in the Pacific Heights neighborhood at 11:00 a.m. on February 7, 2026, and proceeded down Fillmore Street to a rally at Civic Center across from City Hall. The San Francisco Chronicle counted approximately three dozen attendees, while Kauffman had predicted beforehand that "a few dozen" would come.

Participants carried signs with slogans including "We ❤️ You Jeffrey Bezos", "Property Rights Are Human Rights", "The 1% Pays 40% of Taxes", and "It's very difficult to write a nuanced argument on a sign." At the Civic Center rally, Kauffman gave a speech stating: "There are good billionaires and bad billionaires, just like there are good people and bad people. California is extraordinarily lucky that this is where people come to start companies and build fortunes and we should do our best to keep it that way."

Kauffman told reporters he was not aware of any actual billionaires planning to attend the march. Aella, a sex-positive blogger with a large online following, attended in support of the march.

=== Counter-protests ===
The march attracted a group of counter-protesters, many of whom adopted satirical personas. About a dozen counter-protesters dressed in formal attire carried signs with messages such as "Let Them Eat Cake", "Defund the Poor", "Keep California Unequal", and "It's a Class War, and We're Winning." Some adopted mock identities; one couple went by "Oli Garch" and "Trilly O'Naire", and another group billed their presence as a "March for Trillionaires."

Artist Razelle Swimmer brought a large puppet of the Swedish Chef from The Muppets with the slogan "Eat the Rich" and handed out sandwiches to homeless people. Another counter-protester wearing a business suit and crown satirized the idea of billionaire hardship, telling CBS News: "You can't tell if somebody's carrying the weight of billions of dollars. It really is a heavy burden."

Multiple outlets reported that journalists at the event nearly outnumbered the march's actual participants. Mission Local described the ratio of media to participants as approaching what contributor Benjamin Wachs has termed a "panopticonference", an event in which media observers outnumber participants.

=== Reactions along the route ===
Bystanders along Fillmore Street reacted with a mix of confusion and hostility. John Quillinan, who identified himself as the owner of Mureta & Co. jewelry store on Fillmore Street, confronted marchers, saying he would willingly give up 5% of his own wealth to help his community and calling billionaires who would not do so "deplorable". Another pair of bystanders, Michele and Jesse Foster, told CBS News they were unsure whether the march was serious.

== Reception ==
The event received coverage from local and national media outlets, including The Atlantic, whose report described the event as "a funeral for irony", and the Wall Street Journal, which noted that Kauffman was accused of having a "peasant feudal lord mindset". Patrick Murphy, a professor of public affairs at the University of San Francisco, told the San Francisco Examiner before the event that organizing mass mobilization on behalf of monied interests represented "an unusual application of what we think of as the laws of political physics." The Washington Times reported that the event was "largely believed to be satire" even after organizers confirmed it was sincere.

== See also ==
- Taxation in California
