= Great Depression in the United Kingdom =

Aspect of the topic

The Great Depression in the United Kingdom also known as the Great Slump, was a period of national economic downturn in the 1930s, which had its origins in the global Great Depression. It was Britain's largest and most profound economic depression of the 20th century. The Great Depression originated in the United States in late 1929 and quickly spread to the world. Britain did not experience the boom that had characterized the U.S., Germany, parts of the British Empire with Canada and Australia in the 1920s, so its effect appeared less severe. Britain's world trade fell by half (1929–33), the output of heavy industry fell by a third, employment profits plunged in nearly all sectors. At the depth in summer 1932, registered unemployed numbered 3.5 million, and many more had only part-time employment. However at the same time, from 1929 to 1933 employment dipped only to 94.9% relative to 1929 employment metrics and recovery was seen as early at 1933 (numbers are across the entire country, and unemployment did double over this period relative to 1929 metrics). The positive trend continued across real national income and wages. New houses built increased by 33% from 1929 to 1933, while profits, prices, export volume and value, and imports volume and value dropped. Overall, while all these metrics were concerning to parliament and businessmen along with devastating industrial regions, the common person especially in areas around London did not experience major hardship and even prospered.

Particularly hardest hit by economic problems were the industrial and mining areas in the north of England, Scotland, Northern Ireland and Wales. Unemployment reached 70% in some areas at the start of the 1930s (with more than 3 million out of work nationally) and many families depended entirely on payments from local government known as the dole.

== Background ==
The Great Depression of 1929–32 broke out at a time when the United Kingdom was still far from having recovered from the effects of the First World War. Economist Lee Ohanian showed that economic output fell by 25% between 1918 and 1921 and did not recover until the end of the Great Depression, arguing that the United Kingdom suffered a 20-year great depression beginning in 1918. Relative to the rest of the world, economic output declined mildly in the UK between 1929 and 1934.

Heavy industries which formed the bedrock of Britain's export trade (such as coal mining, shipbuilding and steel) were heavily concentrated in certain areas of Britain, such as northern England, South Wales, Northern Ireland and central Scotland, while the newer industries were heavily concentrated in southern and central England. British industrial output during the 1920s ran at about 80–100%, and exports at about 80% of their pre-war levels.

== Gold standard ==
From 1921 Britain began a slow economic recovery from the First World War and the subsequent slump. But in April 1925, the Conservative Chancellor of the Exchequer, Winston Churchill, on advice from the Bank of England, restored the Pound Sterling to the gold standard at its prewar exchange rate of $4.86 US dollars to one pound. This made the pound convertible to its value in gold, but at a level that made British exports more expensive on world markets. The price of gold was over-estimated by 10–14% leading to coal and steel as an export becoming less competitive. The economic recovery immediately slowed. To offset the effects of the high exchange rate, the export industries tried to cut costs by lowering workers' wages.

The industrial areas were in recession during the rest of the 1920s. These industries received little investment or modernization. Throughout the 1920s, unemployment stayed at a steady one million.

== Economic crisis and the Labour minority government ==
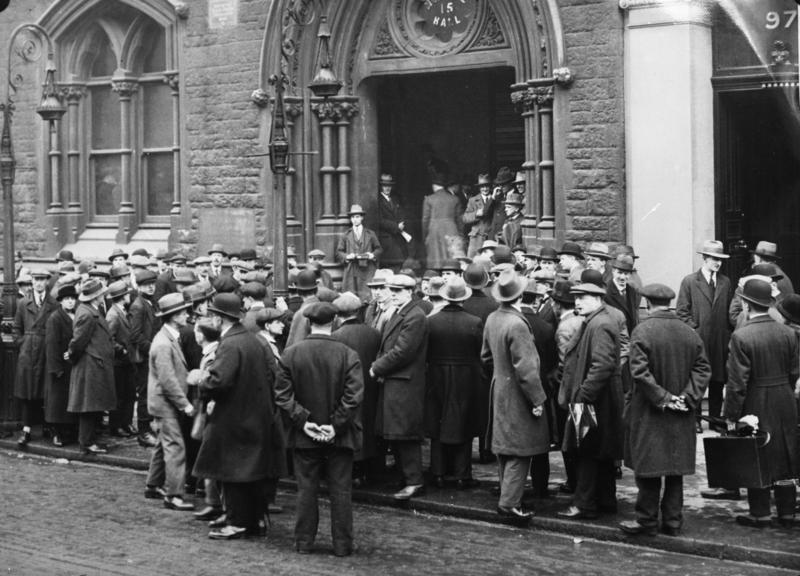
Unemployed people in front of a workhouse in London, 1930

In May 1929, a minority Labour government headed by Ramsay MacDonald came to office with Liberal support. This was only the second time a Labour government had been in office (they had briefly been in office in 1924). Few of the government's members had any deep knowledge of economics or experience of running the economy. MacDonald's Labour Party was not radical in economic thinking, and was wedded to the orthodoxy of classical economics with its emphasis on maintaining a balanced budget at any cost.

In October 1929, the Stock Market Crash in New York heralded the worldwide Great Depression. John Maynard Keynes, who had not predicted the slump, said, "There will be no serious direct consequences in London. We find the look ahead decidedly encouraging."

Doomsayers on the left such as Sidney and Beatrice Webb, J. A. Hobson, and G. D. H. Cole repeated the dire warnings they had been making for years about the imminent death of capitalism, only now far more people paid attention. Starting in 1935 the Left Book Club provided a new warning every month, and built up the credibility of Soviet-style socialism as an alternative.

The ensuing American economic collapse shook the world: World trade contracted, prices fell and governments faced financial crisis as the supply of American credit dried up. Many countries adopted an emergency response to the crisis by erecting trade barriers and tariffs, which worsened the crisis by further hindering global trade. The British Empire lowered tariffs, known as Imperial Preference, while raising them against the U.S. and others.

The effects on the industrial areas of Britain were immediate and devastating, as demand for British products collapsed. By the end of 1930, unemployment had more than doubled from 1 million to 2.5 million (from 12% to 20% of the insured workforce), and exports had fallen in value by 50%. During this time there were little to no unemployment benefits, so this mass unemployment led to many of Britain's population becoming impoverished. Government revenues contracted as national income fell, while the cost of assisting the jobless rose. The industrial areas were hardest hit, along with the coal mining districts. London and the south-east of England were hurt less. In 1933, 30% of Glaswegians were unemployed due to the severe decline in heavy industry.

Under pressure from its Liberal allies as well as the Conservative opposition, the Labour government appointed a committee to review the state of public finances. The May Report of July 1931 urged public sector wage cuts and large cuts in public spending (notably in benefit payments ("dole") to the unemployed) to avoid incurring a budget deficit. The sense was that the deficit was dangerous and had to be reduced; the proposal was to meet £24 million by increased taxes on the rich, and £96 million by economies, of which £64 million would come from unemployment relief. This proposal proved deeply unpopular within the Labour Party and among its main supporters, the trade unions, which along with several government ministers refused to support any such measures. The Chancellor of the Exchequer, Philip Snowden, insisted that the Report's recommendations be adopted to avoid incurring a budget deficit.

In a memorandum in January 1930, one junior government minister, Oswald Mosley, proposed that the government take control of banking and exports, as well as increase pensions to boost purchasing power. When his ideas were turned down, he left Labour to form the New Party, and later the British Union of Fascists.

== National Government ==
The dispute over spending and wage cuts split the Labour government: as it turned out, beyond recovery. The political deadlock that resulted caused investors to take fright, and a flight of capital and gold further de-stabilised the economy. In response, MacDonald, on the urging of King George V, decided to form a "National Government" with the Conservatives and the Liberals.

On 24 August, MacDonald submitted the resignation of his ministers and led his senior colleagues in forming the new National Government. MacDonald and his supporters were expelled from the Labour Party and adopted the label "National Labour". The Labour Party and some Liberals, led by David Lloyd George, went into opposition. The Labour Party denounced MacDonald as a "traitor" and a "rat" for what they saw as his betrayal.

Soon after this, a general election was called. The 1931 general election resulted in a Conservative landslide victory, with the now leaderless Labour Party winning only 46 seats in Parliament. After the 1931 election the national government was Conservative-dominated, although MacDonald continued as prime minister until 1935.

=== Emergency measures ===
In an effort to balance the budget and restore confidence in the pound, on 10 September 1931 with Philip Snowden still as Chancellor, the new national government issued an emergency budget, which immediately instituted a round of cuts in public spending and wages. Public sector wages and unemployment pay were cut by 10%, and income tax was raised from 4s 6d up to 5s on the pound (from 22.5% to 25%). The pay cuts did not go down well, however, and resulted in a non-violent "mutiny" in the Royal Navy protesting the pay cut.

These measures were deflationary and merely reduced purchasing power in the economy, worsening the situation, and by the end of 1931 unemployment had reached nearly 3 million. The measures were also unsuccessful at defending the gold standard, which the National Government had ostensibly been created to defend.

The flight of gold continued, however, and the Treasury finally was forced to abandon the gold standard in September 1931. Until now the government had religiously followed orthodox policies which demanded balanced budgets and the gold standard. Instead of the predicted disaster, cutting loose from gold proved a major advantage. Immediately the exchange rate of the pound fell by 25%, from $4.86 for one pound to $3.40. British exports were now much more competitive, which laid the ground for a gradual economic recovery. The worst was over.

Also, in 1932 following the Ottawa Agreement, Neville Chamberlain, who had become Chancellor after the 1931 election, introduced tariffs on industrial and agricultural imports at a rate of 10% on all imports except those from the countries of the British Empire. The introduction of tariffs caused a split in the Liberal Party, some of whom, along with Phillip Snowden, withdrew support for the National Government.

== During the recession ==
Although the overall picture for the British economy in the 1930s was bleak, the effects of the depression were uneven. Some parts of the country, and some industries, fared better than others. Some parts of the country such as the South Wales Valleys experienced mass unemployment and poverty, while some areas in the Home Counties did not.

The brightest spot was in home building. From 1926 through 1939 over 200,000 new houses were built every year, with the peak reaching 365,000 in 1936. Many suburban districts in London and other cities were built at this time, and Brighton shows many signs of more "high deco" home architecture.

=== The South and the Midlands ===
In London and the south east of England unemployment was initially as high as 13.5%, the later 1930s were a prosperous time in these areas, as a suburban house-building boom was fuelled by the low interest rates which followed the abolition of the gold standard, and as London's growing population buoyed the economy of the Home Counties.

The south was also the home of new developing industries such as the electrical industry, which prospered from the large-scale electrification of housing and industry. Mass production methods brought new products such as electrical cookers and radios into the reach of the middle classes, and the industries which produced these prospered. Nearly half of all new factories that opened in Britain between 1932 and 1937 were in the Greater London area.

Another industry that prospered during the 1930s was the British motor industry. For cities that had a developed motor industry such as Birmingham, Coventry and Oxford, the 1930s were also a boom time. Manufacturers such as Austin, Morris and Ford dominated the motor industry during the 1930s, and the number of cars on British roads doubled within the decade. British agriculture also flourished in the 1930s.

=== In the North and industrial heartlands ===
Northern England, however, was a quite different matter. The north was the home to most of Britain's traditional heavy industries, such as coal mining in Yorkshire and Nottinghamshire, shipbuilding on Tyneside and Wearside, steel in Sheffield and textiles in Lancashire which were heavily export-orientated. The north bore the brunt of the depression, and the 1930s were the most difficult time in living memory for people in these areas. The north was hit so hard in the Great Depression because of the structural decline in British industry. Staple industries such as coal, steel and shipbuilding were smaller, less modern and efficient and over-staffed compared to continental rivals.

In the north east (including Sunderland, Middlesbrough and Newcastle-upon-Tyne) this was especially so. The north east was a major centre of the shipbuilding industry. The Depression caused a collapse in demand for ships. Between 1929-32 ship production declined by 90%, and this in turn affected all the supply industries such as steel and coal. In some towns and cities in the north east, unemployment reached as high as 70%. Among the worst affected towns was Jarrow, where unemployment led to the famous Jarrow March, in which unemployed workers marched 300 mi (480 km) to London to protest against unemployment.

The north west, a centre of the textile industries, was also hard hit, with places such as Manchester and Lancashire suffering a slump. The South Wales Valleys, a centre of the coal mining and steel industries, was also devastated by the depression where towns such as Merthyr Tydfil and Swansea had unemployment rates reaching above 25% at certain times. The industrial belt of central Scotland, also a major shipbuilding centre in Glasgow, was also hard hit by the slump.

In these areas, millions of unemployed and their families were left destitute, and queueing at soup kitchens became a way of life. A government report in the mid-1930s estimated that around 25% of the UK's population existed on a subsistence diet, often with signs of child malnutrition such as scurvy, rickets and tuberculosis. In his book The Road to Wigan Pier, George Orwell described life for the unemployed in northern England during the depression: "Several hundred men risk their lives and several hundred women scrabble in the mud for hours... searching eagerly for tiny chips of coal in slagheaps so they could heat their own homes. For them, this arduously-gained 'free' coal was more important almost than food."

== Welfare state during the 1930s ==
In the 1920s and 1930s, Britain had a relatively advanced welfare system compared to many of the industrialised countries. In 1911 a compulsory national unemployment and health insurance scheme had been put in place by the Liberal government of H. H. Asquith (see Liberal reforms). This scheme had been funded through contributions from the government, the employers and the workers. At first the scheme only applied to certain trades but, in 1920, it was expanded to include most manual workers.

However, the scheme only paid out according to the level of contributions made rather than according to need, and was only payable for 15 weeks. Anyone unemployed for longer than that had to rely on poor law relief paid by their local authority. In effect, millions of workers who had been too poorly paid to make contributions, or who had been unemployed long term, were left destitute by the scheme. With the mass unemployment of the 1930s, contributions to the insurance scheme dried up, resulting in a funding crisis.

In August 1931, the 1911 scheme was replaced by a fully government-funded unemployment benefit system. This system, for the first time, paid out according to need rather than the level of contributions. This unemployment benefit was subject to a strict means test, and anyone applying for unemployment pay had to have an inspection by a government official to make sure that they had no hidden earnings or savings, undisclosed source(s) of income or other means of support. For many poor people, this was a humiliating experience and was much resented.

== Slow recovery ==
Following Britain's withdrawal from the gold standard and the devaluation of the pound, interest rates were reduced from 6% to 2%. As a result, British exports became more competitive on world markets than those of countries that remained on the gold standard. This led to a modest economic recovery, and a fall in unemployment from 1933 onwards. Although exports were still a fraction of their pre-depression levels, they recovered slightly.

Unemployment began a modest fall in 1934 and fell further in 1935 and 1936, but the rise in employment levels occurred mostly in the south, where lower interest rates had spurred the house building boom, which in turn spurred a recovery in domestic industry. The North and Wales remained severely depressed for most of the decade. In severely depressed parts of the country, the government enacted a number of policies to stimulate growth and reduce unemployment, including road building, loans to shipyards, and tariffs on steel imports. These policies helped but were not, however, on a sufficiently large scale to make a huge impact on the unemployment levels.

== Rearmament and recovery ==
Since Britain's debt was 180% of the national GDP economic recovery was difficult. The United Kingdom was able to recover more quickly than other countries that were equally as developed, because their economic growth had been stagnant for some time. This meant that they did not have exponential growth, as the United States did, leaving them with less room to fall. Due to the abandonment of the gold standard in 1931 Britain was able to cut interest rates which led to a drop in real interest rates. This drop in interests rates subsequently led to a boom in construction in the south of Britain; stimulating some renewed economic growth. Also, the government began spending money on goods and services within Britain which aided in the foundation of financial recovery. From 1936 onwards, the National Government followed a policy of mass rearmament in the face of the rise of Nazi Germany. By 1937 unemployment had fallen to 1.5 million, but rose again to 1,810,000 by January 1938 suggesting that the recovery was to be short lived.

== Consequences of the Great Depression ==
By the end of the Second World War in 1945, the majority of the British people, and particularly the working class and returning servicemen and women, were keenly dissatisfied. They rejected a return to pre-war Conservative economic policies, which they blamed for the hardship of the 1930s. They demanded widespread social change. At the 1945 general election, to the surprise of most observers, Conservatives led by Winston Churchill were defeated by the Labour Party headed by Clement Attlee.

The Labour government built up from pre-war foundations what was to become a comprehensive 'cradle-to-grave' welfare state, and established a tax funded National Health Service, which gave treatment according to need rather than ability to pay as the previous tax funded system had been. The Labour government also enacted Keynesian economic policies, to create artificial economic demand leading to full employment. These policies became known as the "post-war consensus", and were accepted by all major political parties at different times.

There were noted disagreements about the involvement of the state with the steel industry. With one government, it was state-owned, to then be sold off with the following Conservative ministry only to be then re-nationalised by the following Labour government. For the most part, the post-war consensus lasted until the late-1970s. Throughout the 1970s, it was becoming clear from all sides that radical change was needed as a result of such economic crises as the 1973 oil shock, high inflation, industrial unrest and sterling devaluation.

== Historic evaluation ==
The events of the 1930s, and the response of the Labour and National governments to the depression, have generated much historical controversy.

In the decades immediately following the Second World War, most historical opinion was critical of the governments of the period. Certain historians, such as Robert Skidelsky in his Politicians and the Slump, compared the orthodox policies of the Labour and National governments unfavourably with the more radical proto-Keynesian measures advocated by David Lloyd George and Oswald Mosley, and the more interventionist and Keynesian responses in other economies: Franklin Roosevelt's New Deal in the United States, the Labour government in New Zealand, and the Social Democratic government in Sweden. Since the 1970s opinion has become less uniformly hostile. In the preface to the 1994 edition, Skidelsky argues that recent experience of currency crises and capital flight make it hard to be so critical of the politicians who wanted to achieve stability by cutting labour costs and defending the value of the currency.

== See also ==
- Great Depression
- Interwar Britain
