= Slutcon =

Sex / sex education conference in San Francisco

Slutcon is an annual sex education conference held in the East Bay area of San Francisco.

The event is three days long. The event was created by Pandora and Chesed, the stage name of the two female hosts of the podcast SlutStack, and sex researcher Aella. Organizers describe Slutcon as combination of a social experiment and a self-help event, the event is focused on sex education. No photography is permitted at the event.

Ticket prices for the event in 2025 varied between US$1,000 and $9,000. The 150 attendees were mostly tech workers. The event was repeated in 2026 on September 25 to September 27, in Berkley, where tickets cost $3,000 to $18,000.

NBC Palm Springs commentator Tammy Black expressed skepticism of the event, and described it as "a brothel spun as something nice."
