= David Gamage =

American legal scholar

David Scott Gamage
- Born: June 17, 1977 (age 48); Los Angeles, California, U.S.
- Education: Stanford University (BA, MA); Yale Law School (JD)
- Occupation: Law Professor
- Organization: University of Missouri
- Website: https://law.missouri.edu/person/david-gamage/

David Gamage is the Law School Foundation Distinguished Professor of Tax Law & Policy at the University of Missouri School of Law. Gamage specializes in tax law and policy and is also a scholar of health law and policy.

== Professional and academic career ==
Gamage was recruited to the University of Missouri in 2024 as part of the part of the MizzouForward program, an ongoing effort to strengthen innovation in research disciplines across the Mizzou campus. Prior to that he was a Professor at Indiana University’s Maurer School of Law, where he held the William W. Oliver Chair in Tax Law. Leading up to Gamage's move to the University of Missouri, Gamage's wife, Shruti Rana, had previously left her prior positions at Indiana University to accept positions at the University of Missouri as Assistant Vice Chancellor and Professor of Law.

Gamage started his academic career as a fellow at the University of Texas School of Law, and was then a professor at the University of California, Berkeley School of Law, for nine years, until he left to accept joint offers for him and for his wife Shruti Rana at Indiana University. Gamage has also been a visiting professor at the Duke University School of Law and at the Georgetown University Law Center.

Among other tax and health law related topics, Gamage works on wealth tax and related tax law reforms. Along with economists Emmanuel Saez and Gabriel Zucman, Gamage helped draft Senator Elizabeth Warren's proposed "Ultra-Millionaire" wealth tax reform during and after her 2019-2020 Presidential campaign. Gamage subsequently helped design legislation for a number of other proposed federal wealth tax and Billionaire and Ultra-millionaire income tax reforms, including President Joe Biden's proposed Billionaire Minimum Income Tax reform proposal. Along with economist Emmanuel Saez and tax law professors Brian Galle and Darien Shanske, Gamage has also designed legislation for wealth tax reform proposals for the state of California, including most recently the 2026 California billionaire tax, and for multi-millionaire mark-to-market income tax reform proposals for the states of Illinois, New York, and Vermont.

== Selected publications ==
=== Wealth taxes and related tax reforms ===
-Taxing Dynasties, 174 University of Pennsylvania Law Review (with Brian Galle and Bob Lord) (2026)
-Money Moves: Taxing the Wealthy at the State Level, 113 California Law Review 635 (with Brian Galle and Darien Shanske) (2025)
-Solving the Valuation Challenge: The ULTRA Method for Taxing Extreme Wealth, 72 Duke Law Journal 1257 (with Brian Galle and Darien Shanske) (2023)
-The Case for Taxing (All of) Labor Income, Consumption, Capital Income, and Wealth, 68 Tax Law Review 355 (2015)

=== Tax law theory ===
-How Should Governments Promote Distributive Justice?: A Framework for Analyzing the Optimal Choice of Tax Instruments, 68 Tax Law Review 1 (2014)
-Three Essays on Tax Salience: Market Salience and Political Salience, 65 Tax Law Review 19 (with Darien Shanske) (2011)

=== Fiscal federalism ===
-Against Doctrinal Siloing: Harmonizing Fiscal Federalism and the U.S. Constitution, 103 Washington University Law Review (with Darien Shanske) (2026)
-Tax Cannibalization and Fiscal Federalism in the United States, 111 Northwestern University Law Review 295 (with Darien Shanske) (2017)
-Preventing State Budget Crises: Managing the Fiscal Volatility Problem, 98 California Law Review 749 (2010)

=== Constitutional law of taxation ===
-The Original Meaning of the Sixteenth Amendment, 102 Washington University Law Review 1 (with John R. Brooks) (2024)
-Taxation and the Constitution, Reconsidered, 76 Tax Law Review 75 (with John R. Brooks) (2022)
