= 2026 California Proposition 42 =

Ballot initiative

Proposition 42
- November 3, 2026
- Prohibit New Taxes on Retirement Holdings, Personal Assets, and Savings and Limit Retroactive Taxes Initiative
- Reporting: 98% as of November 17, 2026 9:47 AM PST

Results
| Choice | Votes | % |
|---|---|---|
| Yes | 6,598,606 | 51.22% |
| No | 6,284,785 | 48.78% |

Proposition 42 is a constitutional amendment that appeared on the November 3, 2026, ballot in California. California currently taxes income from financial assets but does not tax the ownership of assets such as stocks and investment accounts. The amendment passed. Proposition 42 establishes a constitutional prohibition on new state taxes on personal-property ownership, including financial assets, business interests, intellectual property, and assets held in retirement accounts. It also restricts certain retroactive state taxes.

== Background and development ==
Proposition 42 emerged during the campaign over a proposed billionaire wealth tax, subsequently numbered Proposition 40. The wealth-tax initiative was backed by Service Employees International Union–United Healthcare Workers West. Its president, Dave Regan, worked with economist Emmanuel Saez and other academics on developing the proposal following federal Medicaid cuts in President Trump’s Big Beautiful Bill.

Proposition 42 was introduced to the November 2026 ballot alongside the related Proposition 41 by Building a Better California, an organization co-founded by Sergey Brin and Eric Schmidt that opposed the billionaire tax. Both of these propositions were designed to curb the effects of the billionaire tax if it passed. Proposition 41 would have barred new taxes from circumventing rules on education spending requirements for tax revenue, while Proposition 42 would invalidate the billionaire tax by amending the state constitution to forbid retroactive taxation. Another measure that would have required more audits of special taxes and imposed more rules on how revenue could be spent did not qualify for the ballot.

== Campaign funding ==
=== Support ===
The Yes on 42 campaign was mostly funded by Building a Better California. The FPPC identifies Sergey Brin and L. John Doerr III as Building a Better California’s top underlying donors.

=== Opposition ===
The Vote No on 42 campaign was primarily funded by SEIU–United Healthcare Workers West.

== Results ==
Proposition 42 was approved by voters with 51% of the vote.

2026 California Proposition 42 96% reporting
| Choice | Votes | % |
|---|---|---|
| For | 6,521,638 | 51.27 |
| Against | 6,199,087 | 48.73 |
| Total | 12,720,725 | 100.00 |
Source: California Secretary of State

== Aftermath ==
In addition to approving Proposition 42, voters also rejected the billionaire tax proposal that Proposition 42 was designed to invalidate. However, voters rejected Proposition 41, the other billionaire-backed measure that was designed to invalidate the billionaire tax.
