= Michael Marlow (economist) =

American economist

Michael Louis Marlow

Academic background
- Education: George Washington University; Virginia Tech

Academic work
- Discipline: Regulatory economics
- Institutions: California Polytechnic State University

Michael L. Marlow is a professor of economics at California Polytechnic State University (Cal Poly). He is also an affiliated senior scholar at the Mercatus Center at George Mason University. He holds a BA from George Washington University and a PhD from Virginia Tech, both in economics. He joined the California Polytechnic State University faculty in 1988 and was named a University Distinguished Scholar by the university in 2007. Prior to joining Cal Poly, he was an associate professor of economics at George Washington University from 1979 to 1983, and also worked as a senior financial economist at the U.S. Treasury from 1983 to 1988. He is known for opposing government regulation of e-cigarettes and of unhealthy foods and beverages. He has also argued that alcohol taxes primarily reduce consumption by light drinkers, not by heavy drinkers, and has criticized Proposition 65 for being ineffective with respect to public health benefits. His research into the effects of smoking laws has been criticized for being funded by Philip Morris, and for methodological flaws.

== Books ==
- Public Finance: Theory and Practice (Harcourt, 1995)
- The Myth of Fair and Efficient Government: Why The Government You Want Is Not The One You Get (ABC-CLIO, 2011)
