= Joshua D. Rauh =

American economist

Joshua D. Rauh is an American economist.

Rauh is the Ormond Family Professor of Finance at the Stanford Graduate School of Business and a Senior Fellow at the Hoover Institution. From November 2019 to March 2020 he was principal chief economist of the President's Council of Economic Advisers, and prior to that served as director of research at the Hoover Institution. He graduated with a B.A. in economics, magna cum laude with distinction, from Yale University in 1996 and received a Ph.D. in economics from the Massachusetts Institute of Technology in 2004.

== Career ==
Before becoming a Stanford Professor, Rauh formerly taught at University of Chicago's Booth School of Business (2004–9) and the Kellogg School of Management (2009–12). Rauh studies corporate investment, business taxation, government pension liabilities, and investment management. He has published numerous journal articles and was awarded the 2006 Brattle Prize for the outstanding research paper on corporate finance published in The Journal of Finance for his paper “Investment and Financing Constraints: Evidence from the Funding of Corporate Pension Plans.” In 2011 he won the Smith Breeden Prize for the outstanding research paper on capital markets, published in The Journal of Finance, for his paper “Public Pension Promises: How Big Are They and What Are they Worth?” coauthored with Robert Novy-Marx. Other work has appeared in The Quarterly Journal of Economics, The Review of Financial Studies, the Journal of Financial Economics, and the Journal of Political Economy.

Rauh's research on state and local pension systems in the United States has received national media coverage in outlets such as The Wall Street Journal, The New York Times, the Financial Times, and The Economist.
