= Sanjai Bhagat =

American finance professor

Sanjai Bhagat is the Professor of Finance at the Leeds School of Business at the University of Colorado Boulder. He serves as an independent director on corporate boards, and advises various government agencies on corporate finance and corporate governance.

== Career ==
Bhagat graduated with a degree in Mechanical Engineering at the Indian Institute of Technology -Delhi, before attending the University of Rochester for an MBA then earning a PhD in Finance at the University of Washington.

He began his career as an Assistant Professor of Finance at the David Eccles School of Business at the University of Utah; he then joined the University of Washington's Foster School of Business faculty as a visiting Assistant Professor of Economics and Finance. After teaching at the University of Chicago (Chicago Booth) as a visiting Associate Professor of Finance, he joined the Leeds School of Business at University of Colorado. He has also worked at the Economics department at Princeton University as a Visiting Professor, and the U.S. Securities and Exchange Commission.

At the Leeds School of Business, he was the founding Director of the Burridge Center for Securities Analysis & Valuation.

== Research work ==
Bhagat's research focuses on corporate governance, value-creating acquisitions, IPO valuation, new venture finance, executive compensation, ESG, capitalism and rule of law. His paper, "Corporate Governance and Corporate Performance" was awarded the Paper of the Decade Award for being the most impactful paper in the Journal of Corporate Finance during 2008–2018. Bhagat has written extensively on executive pay and board of directors compensation and equity.

His paper "The Promise and Perils of Corporate Governance Indices", was selected as one of the "Best Corporate and Securities Articles" by the Vanderbilt Law School publication Corporate Practice Commentator. The European Corporate Governance Institute also awarded the article the De Brauw Blackstone Westbroek Law Prize for best paper. He is the author of Financial Crisis, Corporate Governance, and Bank Capital, which argues that future financial crises can be averted by changing incentive contracts for top executives and by requiring banks to hold larger cash reserves.
