= United Health Centers of San Joaquin Valley =

United Health Centers
- Type: Federally Qualified Health Center
- Industry: Healthcare
- Headquarters: Fresno, California
- Number of employees: 600-700
- Website: www.unitedhealthcenters.org

United Health Centers of the San Joaquin Valley is a private non-profit organization, established from a grass root movement by people trying to improve access to healthcare in their rural communities in California's Central Valley.

Stretching 450 miles from Shasta to Kern counties, California's Central valley encompasses the Sacramento Valley in the north and the San Joaquin Valley in the south. Of its 5 million residents, 1 in 5 residents are unemployed, and on average 12.8% of the population works in agriculture related industries. Located in the agricultural city of Parlier, California, United Health Centers of San Joaquin Valley is a Federally Qualified Health Center (FQHC) whose main purpose is to be "committed to the lifetime wellness of our communities by providing accessible, comprehensive quality health care to everyone, including farm worker families and the underserved, with compassion and respect, regardless of ability to pay." Beginning in 1971, United Health Centers of the San Joaquin Valley (UHC), a private non-profit organization, was established from a grass-roots movement by people trying to improve access to healthcare in their rural communities. They focused on ways to address the high infant morbidity and mortality rates, lack of medical and dental services, and the paucity of accessibility and affordability to health care. With clinics located in Parlier, Orange Cove, Huron, Earlimart, Mendota, Kerman, Sanger and Corcoran, United Health Centers is staffed by more thank 600 health professionals consisting of physicians, physician assistants, nurse practitioners, nurse, pharmacists, lab and x-ray technicians, dentist, dental hygienists, nutritionists, and certified ancillary personnel, the majority of whom are bilingual.

== History ==
Starting in 1970, the residents of Orange Cove convened to addresses growing health concerns in the city. When they formed a committee, the closest county health department was the county hospital's emergency room in Fresno, 50 miles away. With the assistance of the Fresno Economic Opportunities Commission, the committee formed and incorporated the Orange Cove Family Health Center, Inc. in January 1971 with the first clinic opening in Orange Cove that October. At this same time, a group of citizens in close by Parlier used funds from the Migrant Health Act that Fresno County had denied to form the Parlier Family Health Center Inc. By 1975 these two organizations that formed under similar circumstances merged and officially became the Orange Cove-Parlier Family Health Centers, Inc. In 1976 after working with CHEPA, Inc. to help one of its clinics in Five Points, California apple for Rural Health Initiative, Orange Cove-Parlier Family Health Centers, Inc. merged with CHEPA to form the United Health Centers of the San Joaquin Valley, Inc. This name represented their varied patient cohort areas ranging from the Western foothills of the Sierra Nevada in Orange Cove to the eastern slopes of the Coastal Range in Five Points. In 1977, UHC received a grant to construct permanent facilities at the Orange Cove and Parlier locations. The abandoned portables were then transferred to a labor camp in Huron to serve as their health center. A public health clinic had once stood there until the Fresno County Health Department discontinued it. After 8 years of use, a permanent facility was built for the Huron Health Center. By 1982, UHC was offered ownership of a health center located in the southern end of the San Joaquin Valley, thus making the Earlimart Health Center the fourth UHC health center. In succeeding years, UHC health centers were established in the communities of Mendota in 1993, Kerman in 1994, Sanger in 1995, and Corcoran in 2012. Currently, UHC is working on adding centers in Lemoore, Reedley, and a school based clinic in Raisin City.

== Locations ==
United Health Centers currently operates 19 Health Centers and 15 WIC sites serving 28 rural communities in the following counties: Fresno County, Tulare County and Kings County.

UHC sites are located in Dinuba, Fresno, Parlier, Mendota, Sanger, Orange Cove, Huron, Kerman, Earlimart, Corcoran, Lemoore, Reedley, Raisin City, Selma, and Fowler.

== Population ==
The Central Valley's fertile soils have made it a world recognized center for agriculture; on 1% of the nation's farm land, the Central Valley produces 25% of the nations table food. 9 of the valley's 18 counties have 20% or more of the working population involved in the agriculture industry. The valley's population is set to increase to almost 12 million people by 2040. This growth is fueled by the influx of immigrants into the valley. 58% of the Central Valley's growth is due to domestic and international migrant. In the San Joaquin Valley approximately 26% of migrants were foreign born with 67% being from Mexico. 39.8% of the Central Valley residents identified as Latino in the 2000 census. The towns of Huron, Parlier, Mendota, San Joaquin, Orange Cove, Arvin, Firebaugh, McFarland, Woodlake, and Sanger, all San Joaquin Valley cities, have above 80% Latino population. According to the Public Policy Institute of California, the "San Joaquin Valley's high incidence of poverty among immigrants, generally low levels of education, and limited English language skills present challenges for the region's social service providers, particularly in health care and education." One problem that this focus on agriculture causes in the Central Valley, especially the San Joaquin valley is the migratory patterns of its people both into and out of the valley. According to 2000 census data, the San Joaquin Valley saw a large influx of roughly 20,000 immigrants with a high school diploma or less, and an outflux of approximately 3,000 persons with a college degree. All of the counties in the San Joaquin Valley have a larger percentage of children in poverty, with Fresno and Tulare Counties having 32% and 33% of the child population in poverty, respectively. 80% of the children of immigrant parents in the valley live in homes that income is less than 200% of the federal poverty level. All of the San Joaquin Valley's counties have less than the national average of 235 physicians per 100,000 residents, with the lowest county being Madera County with 73 physicians/100,000 patients. Kern, Fresno, Tulare, and Merced counties were included in the American Lung Association's list of top 10 most ozone-polluted counties in the US in 2007. This is related to residents in the Valley have the third-highest asthma prevalence in the nation. The migratory nature of its residents complicates the utilization and access to regular healthcare in the valley.

== Meeting needs of population ==
In order to serve its rural population, UHC offers an array of health services to make sure that the isolated and often impoverished communities have access to all forms of health care. Currently UHC offers general and family medicine, pediatrics, general dentistry, chiropractic, optometry, pharmacy, clinical laboratory, x-ray, dermatology telemedicine, integrated behavioral health, and preventative medicine programs. To supplement these programs, UHC also offers perinatal health, nutrition counseling, WIC services, health education and promotion, family planning, immunizations, translation, community outreach, maternal and child health, and transportation services. To help ease the burden on its patients without insurance, UHC bases its fees on a sliding scale based on income and family size. With the medicare expansion under ACA, UHC is reaching out to its patents without insurance to sign up all that are eligible. In an effort to increase mental health, all UHC centers offer behavioral/mental health services. Once a patient is viewed as being under mental distress, the primary care provider will inform the patient of the services that they offer to help them cope, and will bring in the Case Manager into the room and introduce them. UHC refers to this a "warm handoff," allowing trust to be built immediately stemming from the patients trust of the physician. By offering this service immediately, they have decreased the amounts of no shows for behavioral/mental Health appointments.

UHC hosts a variety of community engagement events to increase service awareness, inform local populations about pertinent information, and provide free health screenings to isolated populations. Throughout the year, UHC host health fairs to offer health screenings, vaccinations, and flu shots as well as inform people to possible new benefits available to them through the Affordable Care Act. Every year, in coordination with JG Boswell Company, a large farming company, UHC goes to the fields and offers health screenings to the farm workers to allow them to receive health services they need for free without having to miss work. UHC is taking advantage of the fact that the ACA has increased funds for school based clinics by opening one in the town of Raisin City. Currently, the closest clinic would be in Fresno, 17 miles away. School base clinics act offer inexpensive primary care, vaccinations, and prescriptions to the children while allowing them to miss less school than a usual doctors visit or urgent care would require. Other community members are also able to use these clinics.

== UHC Foundation ==
The UHC Foundation is a 501(c)(3) organization that commits to providing quality health supportive services with a variety of resources to enhance the well-being of rural San Joaquin Valley communities.

In 1971, UHC originated in the farm working communities where residents expressed the need to have improved access to healthcare. These communities envisioned having the most comprehensive families oriented health care system to address the lack of medical and dental services thereby addressing such concerns as high infant morbidity and mortality rates and the affordability of healthcare. After 49 years, UHC serves over 100,000 patients with 450,000 clinical appointments a year, from 19 Health Centers covering 3 Central Valley counties across Fresno, Kings and Tulare.

In 2012, the UHC Foundation was formed to dedicate additional resources to support community programs with a high level of assistance towards enabling greater accessibility and improving community wellness for healthier lives in rural communities. The UHC Foundation supports many programs beyond the scope of healthcare including the UHC/YMCA Summer Youth Camp where over 80 children attend camp each year, the UHC Patient Transportation Program, a fleet of 5 transportation vehicles utilized throughout the year to service over 13,000 patients and the UHC Prom Treasures Program for Prom Dresses which supports valley teens by providing dresses for less fortunate students.
