= Alianza Metropolitan =

Newspaper published in San Jose

- Type: Weekly newspaper
- Format: Broadsheet
- Owner(s): Rossana Drumond
- Editor: Gerardo Fernandez
- Founded: 1986
- Headquarters: 300 S. First Street, Suite 207, San Jose, CA 95113 United States
- Circulation: 20,000
- OCLC number: 34427239
- Website: alianzanews.com

Alianza Metropolitan is a bi-weekly bilingual, English and Spanish, newspaper that serves the Hispanic community in the greater metropolitan area of San Jose, California. The paper was founded in 1986 and is currently 100% Hispanic owned, by Rossana Drumond and previously by George Villalobos. The paper is edited by Gerardo Fernandez. The website of the newspaper is in Spanish. The paper's estimated circulation totals 20,000.

== History ==
Alianza Metropolitan was founded in 1986 by George Villalobos.

In 1996, San Jose Mercury News, owned by media conglomerate Knight Ridder, established Nuevo Mundo and its Spanish-language weekly subsidiary to compete directly with the three local Hispanic-owned papers: La Ofreta, El Observador, and Alianza. Within months of its launch, Nuevo Mundo began drawing readership and advertising away from the three papers, causing financial troubles for the local papers. In 2005 Mercury News shut down its foreign language subsidiaries including Nuevo Mundo.

Current publisher Rossana Drumond is Region VI Chair for the National Association of Hispanic Publications. In 2017, Drumond was voted "Publisher of the Year" by the NAHP.

== Awards ==
=== National Association of Hispanic Publications (NAHP) José Martí Media Awards ===
Year	Award	Place	Recipient
2017	Outstanding Design - Broadsheet	Gold	Alianza Metropolitan
	Outstanding Less Than Weekly	Bronze	Alianza Metropolitan
	Outstanding Editorial Column - Spanish (circ >30,000)	Bronze	Alianza Metropolitan
	Outstanding Health Article	Gold	Liz Gonzalez
2016	Outstanding Design - Broadsheet	Bronze	Alianza Metropolitan
	Outstanding Latin America Political/Business Article	Bronze	Rossana Drumond & Amalia García
	Outstanding Less Than Weekly	Silver	Alianza Metropolitan
2015	Outstanding Less Than Weekly	Silver	Alianza Metropolitan
	Outstanding Design - Broadsheet	Bronze	Alianza Metropolitan
2014	Outstanding Design - Broadsheet	Bronze	Alianza Metropolitan
2012	Outstanding Less than Weekly		Alianza Metropolitan
2006	Outstanding Less than Weekly	Gold	Alianza Metropolitan
	Outstanding Editorial Column	Bronze	Rossana Drumond
