= Chief services officer =

Corporate title

The chief services officer (CSO) is a position at the head of a firm carrying significant service design responsibilities. The CSO typically is responsible for developing processes and tools, both internally and externally, for producing maximum value to all stakeholders with intelligent and efficient use of potentially fluctuating human resources.

In some organizations, the same person may hold this title along with that of chief operations officer (COO) as they both are same level roles. Alternatively, a company could have one or the other, or both occupied by separate people. Often, a CSO exists in heavily client-focussed companies, while a COO exists in product development focused companies. A CSO almost always has a strong operations background and advanced degree, whereas a COO often has a background in business development. Both CSO and COO report to the CEO or managing director of a company.
