= Daniel A. Sumner =

American economist

Daniel Alan Sumner is an American economist, currently the Frank H. Buck, Jr. Distinguished Professor and Director of the University of California, Agricultural Issues Center at University of California, Davis. He is also a publisher author.

== Noted works ==
- Sumner, Daniel A. (2008). "Agriculture Subsidy Programs". In Henderson, David R. (ed.). The Concise Encyclopedia of Economics. Library of Economics and Liberty (2nd ed.). Liberty Fund. pp. 4–6. ISBN 978-0865976665.
