= Aella (writer) =

American blogger and sex worker (born 1991/1992)

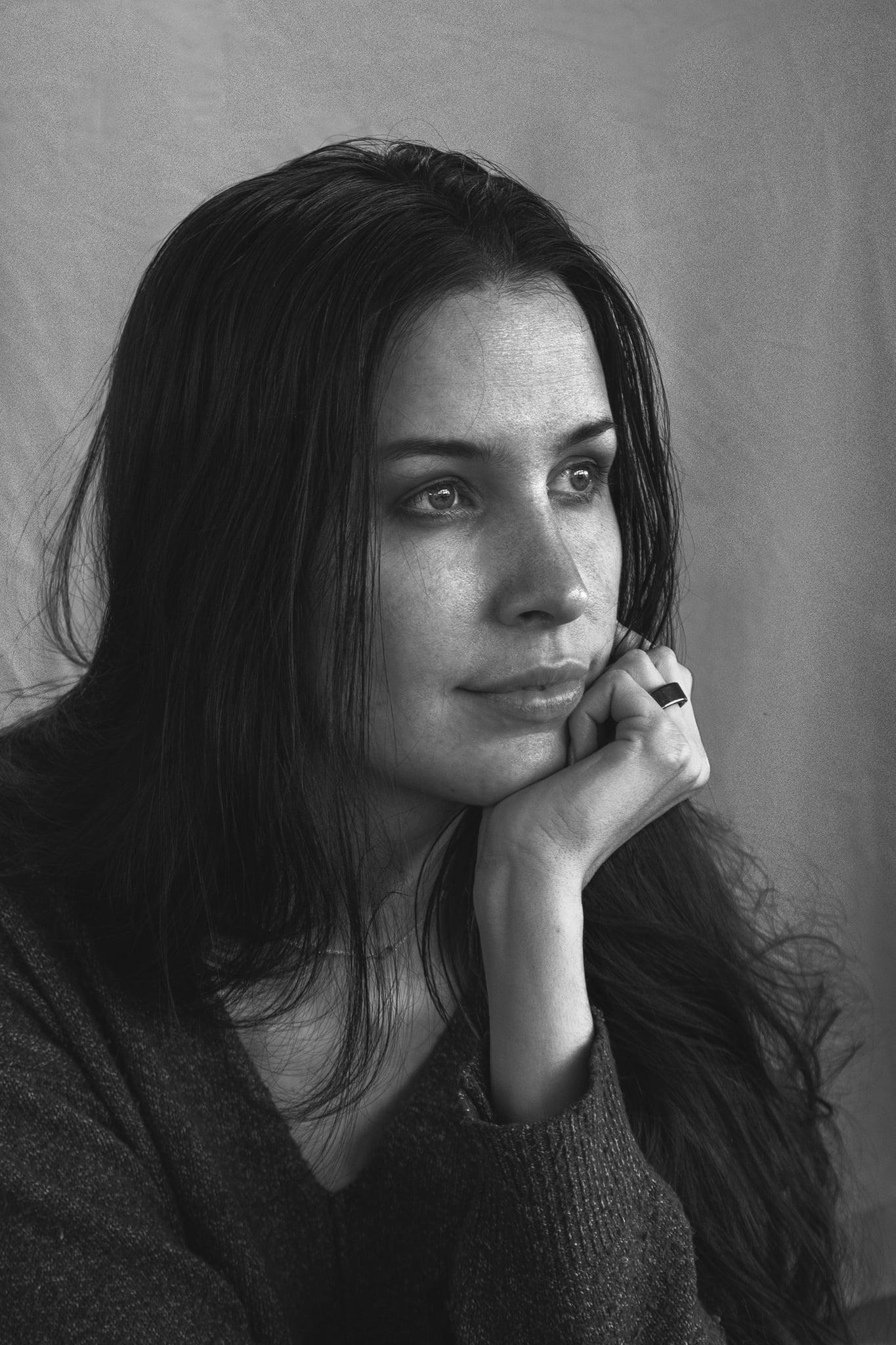
- Aella in 2023
- Born: 1991 or 1992 (age 33–34)

Substack information
- Newsletter: Knowingless
- Topics: social analysis, sex work strategies, psychedelics, short stories
- Subscribers: 146k+

X information
- Handle: @Aella_Girl
- Display name: Aella
- Years active: September 2012; 14 years ago
- Topics: social analysis, short stories
- Followers: 255.6K
- Last updated: September 23, 2026
- Website: knowingless.com

Aella (/ˈeɪlə/, EY-la; born 1991 or 1992) is a pseudonymous American blogger, sex worker, and camgirl whose writing and surveys explore the psychology and economics of online sex work.

GQ magazine has called Aella a "data-driven former tech worker", and Reason magazine has called her a "data scientist".

== Career ==
Aella moved out at age 17 after a falling-out with her parents. She was unable to pay for college and had to drop out to work in a factory to assemble electrical components for $10 an hour. Eventually, after seeing what women were making on OnlyFans, quit and began her journey as a cam girl, initially on MyFreeCams. In 2013, her first published article appeared on Patheos's Friendly Atheist blog, in which she recounted her strict Christian upbringing and departure from religion. She chose to go by the alias Aella in order to prevent viewers from sending her content to her parents. She began posting on OnlyFans in March 2020. She eventually became one of the most successful performers on OnlyFans, making over $100,000 in some months. By 2021, she was described as having set herself apart partly by conducting extensive market research, including surveying almost 400 fellow female OnlyFans performers about their incomes and identifying factors that correlated with higher earnings. She has also worked as an escort. In November 2024, she said her main source of income was her writing on Substack. She has also been involved in several startups. Aella is also an AI safety advocate and warns of the threats of AI. She created a non-profit called Plz Don't Kill Us that allows creators to post AI doom content on its platform to spread awareness. During an interview, she compared AI to nuclear bombs, stating that AI will potentially be "world-altering".

A 2025 article in The Atlantic by Helen Lewis noted Aella's willingness to ask controversial questions. Lewis compared her to Alfred Kinsey, while Justin Garcia, director of the Kinsey Institute, compared her to Ruth Westheimer. Psychology professor and sex researcher J. Michael Bailey criticized what he saw as Aella's casual approach but praised her willingness to brook controversy and said her work was worthwhile. Lewis wrote:

Thanks to her talent for virality, she has been able to create huge online surveys that, despite the limitations of the medium, provide some of the broadest insights that we have into sexuality in the 2020s... She is as uninhibited about asking inflammatory questions as she is about posting nudes: She has written about whether penis size is correlated with race ("We haven't had a good, high-n study") and asked her followers if they would support the creation of realistic child-size sex dolls for pedophiles (77.4 percent said no).

Lewis reported that more than 700,000 people had responded to Aella's "Big Kink" survey, while noting that her survey respondents skewed white and college-educated, with liberals overrepresented. The survey took around 40 minutes to complete and offered participants a "freakiness" score to encourage completion.

In 2025, The San Francisco Standard listed Allea in its SF100—an annual list of influential San Francisco figures—describing her as a sex researcher, X provocateur, and Substack star.

Lewis from the Atlantic also explained how she had sex for 41 days, but with 40 different people, which is known because she gathers information about people's sex life, including her own.

In 2023, Aella appeared on Lex Fridman's podcast.

=== Conferences ===
At Manifest 2023, a prediction market conference in Berkeley, Aella led a live-polling session. She also presented on data-driven sex parties at Hereticon.

In October 2025, she co-organized the inaugural SlutCon with podcasters Pandora and Chesed. The three-day event in California's East Bay drew about 220 people, mostly men, for workshops and exercises in flirting and relationships. She gave its opening address.

== Personal life ==
Aella grew up in Idaho as the oldest of three daughters of conservative parents who were part of a community of fundamentalist Christians; their family name has been withheld in media coverage for privacy reasons. Her father was a well-known evangelist and radio host. According to Aella, she was homeschooled except for three months spent in public high school, which she was withdrawn from "because I had access to computers without parental supervision."

After moving out at 17, Aella briefly attended college in northern Idaho but ran out of money before completing her first semester. She then worked at a factory, which required her to wake up around 4 a.m. and often work more than 50 hours a week. She lived with five roommates, slept on a mattress, and made $10 an hour. After quitting her factory job, Aella became a camgirl due to lack of money. Her two younger sisters have also worked as camgirls, performing without nudity.

Aella has said she has "libertarian-leaning" political views, and has said that "I like capitalism." She has advocated decriminalizing sex work, arguing that it would make it easier for workers to seek police assistance. She describes herself as a member of the rationalist community. She joined in 2015, after dating someone interested in LessWrong.

A Sankey diagram that Aella made about the selection of participants for her February 2024 birthday gang bang later became an internet meme.

== See also ==
- Sex positivity
- Rationalist community
