= Lee Ohanian =

American economist, columnist and author

- Born: February 24, 1957 (age 69); Los Angeles, California, U.S.
- Occupation: Economics professor

Academic background
- Education: University of California, Santa Barbara (BA); University of Rochester (MA, PhD)
- Thesis: The Macroeconomic Effects of War Finance in the United States (1997)
- Doctoral advisor: Thomas F. Cooley

Academic work
- Discipline: Macroeconomics
- Institutions: University of Pennsylvania (1992–1995); University of Minnesota (1995–1999); University of California, Los Angeles (2000–present); Arizona State University (2010–present); Hoover Institution, Stanford University (2011–present)

Lee Edward Ohanian (born February 24, 1957) is an American economist, columnist, and author. He is a professor of economics at the University of California, Los Angeles, associate director of the Center for the Advanced Study in Economic Efficiency at Arizona State University, and serves as a senior fellow at the Hoover Institution of Stanford University. Ohanian previously taught at the University of Minnesota, the University of Pennsylvania, the Stockholm School of Economics, and was a consultant to the Federal Reserve Bank of Minneapolis.

== Early life and education ==
Ohanian was born in Los Angeles, California. He matriculated at the University of California, Santa Barbara, graduating in 1979 with an undergraduate degree in economics, summa cum laude, and going on to earn a master's degree from the University of Rochester. After earning his degree, Ohanian pursued a career as a business economist, becoming the vice-president of Security Pacific Bank. In 1988, he returned to the University of Rochester on a Wallis fellowship to complete a PhD in economics. In his dissertation, "The Macroeconomic Effects of War Finance in the US: World War II and the Korean War" published in the American Economic Review while he was a professor at the University of Minnesota, Ohanian examined the macroeconomics of war finance.

== Academic career ==
Upon completing his dissertation, Ohanian joined the faculty of the University of Pennsylvania, teaching there for three years before becoming an associate professor of economics at the University of Minnesota. In 1999, he joined the economics faculty of the University of California, Los Angeles where, between 2000 and 2004, he became vice-chair of its economics department. Throughout his career, Ohanian served as an advisor to multiple Federal Reserve banks, foreign central banks, and the National Science Foundation.

He is a research associate at the National Bureau of Economic Research, where he is co-director of its "Macroeconomics across Time and Space" program. He has written for The Wall Street Journal, Forbes, and Newsweek.

== See also ==
- Hoover Institution
