= Legal history of income tax in the United States =

Taxation of income in the United States has been practiced since colonial times. Some southern states imposed their own taxes on income from property, both before and after Independence. The Constitution empowered the federal government to raise taxes at a uniform rate throughout the nation, and required that "direct taxes" be imposed only in proportion to the Census population of each state. Federal income tax was first introduced under the Revenue Act of 1861 to help pay for the Civil War. It was renewed in later years and reformed in 1894 in the form of the Wilson-Gorman tariff.

Legal challenges centered on whether the income tax then in force constituted a "direct tax". In the Springer v. United States case of 1881, the Supreme Court upheld the tax regime then in force. A 1894 statute was ruled unconstitutional in the case of Pollock v. Farmers' Loan and Trust Company. In response, the Sixteenth Amendment, proposed in 1909 and becoming law in 1913, cancelled the "apportionment" requirement for income taxes. Federal income tax was thereupon reintroduced in the Revenue Act of 1913. In the case of Brushaber v. Union Pacific Railroad Company (1916), the 1913 Act was ruled to be constitutional. A separate excise tax was also imposed on corporations.

Subsequent legal actions were concerned with what should be counted as "income" under the 1913 Act. In Eisner v. Macomber (1920), the Supreme Court ruled that proportionate stock dividends were not taxable as income, on the grounds that the dividend income was not "severable" from the capital holding from which it was derived. Later decisions, however, have tended to limit this view of "severability," and to uphold the federal statutes as exertions of the power of Congress to tax.

== History through 1916 ==
=== Early history ===
The first attempt to tax income in the British colonies not yet the United States was in 1643 when several colonies instituted a "faculties and abilities" tax. Tax collectors would literally go door to door and ask if the individual had income during the year. If so, the tax was computed on the spot. The income tax raised little revenue, and was viewed as a supplement to more traditional forms of property taxation.

=== Constitutional provisions ===
Article I, Section 8, Clause 1 of the United States Constitution (the "Taxing and Spending Clause"), specifies Congress's power to impose "Taxes, Duties, Imposts and Excises," but Article I, Section 8 requires that, "Duties, Imposts and Excises shall be uniform throughout the United States."

In addition, the Constitution specifically limited Congress' ability to impose direct taxes, by requiring that direct taxes be imposed in proportion to each state's census population. It was thought that head taxes and property taxes (slaves could be taxed as either or both) were likely to be abused, and that they bore no relation to the activities in which the federal government had a legitimate interest. The fourth clause of section 9 therefore specifies that, "No Capitation, or other direct, Tax shall be laid, unless in Proportion to the Census or enumeration herein before directed to be taken."

Taxation was also the subject of Federalist No. 33 penned secretly by the Federalist Alexander Hamilton under the pseudonym Publius. In it, he explains that the wording of the "Necessary and Proper" clause should serve as guidelines for the legislation of laws regarding taxation. The legislative branch is to be the judge, but any abuse of those powers of judging can be overturned by the people, whether as states or as a larger group.

=== Early colonial and state income taxes ===
In the early 18th century and well into the 19th century, a number of the southern colonies and states adopted an income tax modeled on the tax instituted in England. The British theory was that you tax the income from property, and not the property itself; thus, sales of property were not subject to taxation.

=== First income tax law ===
In order to help pay for its war effort in the American Civil War, the United States government imposed its first personal income tax, on August 5, 1861, as part of the Revenue Act of 1861. Tax rates were 3% on income exceeding $600 and less than $10,000, and 5% on income exceeding $10,000. This tax was repealed and replaced by another income tax in the Revenue Act of 1862.

After the war when the need for federal revenues decreased, Congress (in the Revenue Act of 1870) let the tax law expire in 1873. However, one of the challenges to the validity of this tax reached the United States Supreme Court in 1880. In Springer v. United States, the taxpayer contended that the income tax on his professional earnings and interest income on bonds violated the "direct tax" requirement of the Constitution. The Supreme Court concluded that the tax of which Mr. Springer complained (i.e. a tax on professional earnings and on interest from bonds) was within the category of an excise or duty, and was neither a capitation tax (based on population) nor a property tax. The court also concluded that direct taxes, within the meaning of the Constitution, were only capitation taxes and taxes on real estate.

=== Second income tax law ===
In 1894, a Democratic-led Congress passed the Wilson-Gorman tariff. This imposed the first peacetime income tax. The rate was 2% on income over $4000, which meant fewer than 10% of households would pay any. The purpose of the income tax was to make up for revenue that would be lost by tariff reductions. This was a controversial provision, and the law actually passed without the signature of President Grover Cleveland.

=== "Direct" income tax unconstitutional: Pollock v. Farmers' Loan Trust Company ===
Once again, a taxpayer challenged the legality of the income tax. In Pollock v. Farmers' Loan and Trust Company (1895), Charles Pollock sued the corporation in which he owned stock, contending that the corporation should never have paid the income tax because the tax was unconstitutional. In this case, the tax was paid on income from land. Pollock argued that since a tax on real estate is a direct tax, a tax on the income from such property should be a direct tax as well. Because the Constitution prohibited a "direct tax" unless the tax is apportioned, Pollock argued that the unapportioned income tax should be declared unconstitutional. The "direct tax" argument had also been used by Springer in 1880, but now the Court focused more closely on the wording in the Constitution. The provisions were Article I, Section 8, Clause 1, which provides that "all Duties, Imposts and Excises shall be uniform throughout the United States" and Article I, Section 9, Clause 4, which provides: "No Capitation, or other direct, Tax shall be laid, unless in Proportion to the Census or Enumeration herein before directed to be taken.

In effect, the latter clause required any direct tax to be based on a census. For example, if the government desired to raise $10 million and New York had 20% of the total U.S. population at that time, then New York would be required to raise $2 million. If New York had 1 million residents, each resident would owe $2 in taxes. Obviously, a tax based on income could not achieve such proportionality, since incomes differed across individuals.

This time, the Court stated that "although there have been, from time to time, intimations that there might be some tax which was not a direct tax, nor included under the words 'duties, imposts, and excises,' such a tax, for more than 100 years of national existence, has as yet remained undiscovered, notwithstanding the stress of particular circumstances has invited thorough investigation into sources of revenue." In other words, the federal taxing power consists of four categories: direct taxes, duties, imposts and excises (with the latter three categories sometimes called simply "indirect taxes").

In a 5–4 decision on April 8, 1895, the Court ruled that the unapportioned income tax on income from land was unconstitutional. On May 20, 1895, the Court expanded its holding to rule that the unapportioned income tax on income from personal property (such as interest income and dividend income) was also unconstitutional. This decision partially overturned the ruling in Springer v. United States.

The Court held that taxes on the rents or income of real estate, on personal property, or on the income of personal property (e.g. interest and dividends), were direct taxes within the meaning of the Constitution, and therefore had to be apportioned. In Springer, the Court had held that direct taxes within the meaning of the Constitution were only capitation taxes and taxes on real estate. Therefore in Pollock, the Court overruled a portion of the Springer decision by expanding the definition of direct taxes. The portion of the Springer decision that was not overruled by the Court in Pollock was the portion of the holding that applied to taxes on professional earnings. Since apportionment of income taxes is impractical, the Court's decision had the effect of prohibiting a federal tax on income from property. The power to tax real and personal property, or that such was a direct tax, was not denied by the Constitution. Due to the political difficulties of taxing individual wages without taxing income from property, a federal income tax was impractical from the time of the Pollock decision until the time of ratification of the Sixteenth Amendment (below).

Thus, the 1894 tax law was ruled unconstitutional and was effectively repealed.

=== Modern income tax ===
In 1909, fifteen years after Pollock, Congress took two actions to deal with their increasing revenue needs.

1. Corporate excise tax. First, Congress passed a corporate excise tax. The amount of the excise was set at 1% of each corporation's income exceeding $5,000. In 1911, the U.S. Supreme Court upheld this corporate excise as constitutional in Flint v. Stone Tracy Company, in which the court ruled that the tax was an excise upon the privilege of doing business in corporate form.

2. Sixteenth Amendment. More importantly, in 1909 Congress proposed the Sixteenth Amendment. This amendment reads as follows:

The Congress shall have power to lay and collect taxes on incomes, from whatever source derived, without apportionment among the several States, and without regard to any census or enumeration.

By February 1913, the required three-fourths of the states ratified the Sixteenth Amendment, thus adding the amendment to the constitution.

Later that year, Congress enacted the Revenue Act of 1913. The tax ranged from 1% on income exceeding $3,000 to 7% on incomes exceeding $500,000.

Subsequently, the U.S. Supreme Court in 1916 upheld the constitutionality of the Revenue Act of 1913 in the case of Brushaber v. Union Pacific Railroad Company, 240 U.S. 1 (1916). The Court held that the Act was constitutional based on the following: 1) there was power by virtue of the Sixteenth Amendment to levy the tax without apportionment; 2) the due process clause of the Fifth Amendment is not a limitation upon Congress's taxing power; and 3) the statute did not violate the uniformity clause of Article I, Section 8 of the Constitution.

== Definitions of "income" ==
The term "income" is not defined in the Internal Revenue Code. The closest that Congress comes to defining income is found in the definition of "gross income" in Internal Revenue Code section 61, which is largely unchanged from its predecessor, the original Section 22(a) definition of income in the Revenue Act of 1913:

Sec. 22(a). "Gross income" includes gains, profits, and income derived from salaries, wages or compensation for personal service (including personal service as an officer or employee of a State, or any political subdivision thereof, or any agency or instrumentality of any one or more of the foregoing), of whatever kind and in whatever form paid, or from professions, vocations, trades, businesses, commerce, or sales, or dealings in property, whether real or personal, growing out of the ownership or use of or interest in such property; also from interest, rent, dividends, securities, or the transaction of any business carried on for gain or profit, or gains or profits and income derived from any source whatsoever.

=== Eisner v. Macomber ===
One of the earliest attempts to define income occurred in the case of Eisner v. Macomber, in which the U.S. Supreme Court addressed the taxability of a proportionate stock dividend (as opposed to a monetary or cash dividend on stock). This case provided the Court with a forum to try to interpret exactly what Congress intended to include in the sparse Section 22 definition of "income." This was not the first time the Court had addressed the issue: the case had been argued in the previous term of the Court, and was being reargued with additional oral and written briefs.

The Court stated that it needed to examine the boundaries of the definition of income for several reasons. First, the Revenue Act of 1916 expressly stated that a "stock dividend shall be considered income, to the amount of the cash value." In a previous case, Towne v. Eisner, the Court had ruled, however, that a stock dividend made in 1914 against surplus earned prior to January 1, 1913 was not taxable under the Act of October 3, 1913, which provided that net income included "dividends." The district court in that case had noted that: "It is manifest that the stock dividend in question cannot be reached by the Income Tax Act, and could not, even though Congress expressly declared it to be taxable as income, unless it is in fact income." The Court had held, however, that the stock dividend was the equivalent of income. The Supreme Court in Towne v. Eisner then reversed the lower court, finding that the dividend was not income because the "proportional interest of each shareholder remains the same ... and the stockholder is no richer than they were before."

As a result, the Court decided in Eisner v. Macomber to address the larger constitutional question of whether or not a stock dividend was gross income within the meaning of "income" as used in the Sixteenth Amendment. As noted by the Court:

In order, therefore, that the clauses cited from Article 1 of the Constitution may have proper force and effect, save only as modified by the Amendment, and that the latter also may have proper effect it becomes essential to distinguish between what is and what is not "income" as the term is there used; and to apply the distinction, as cases arise, according to truth and substance, without regard to form. Congress cannot by any definition it may adopt conclude the matter, since it cannot by legislation alter the Constitution, from which it derives its power to legislate, and within whose limitations alone that power can be lawfully exercised.

As a starting point, the Court defined income succinctly by reference to the dictionary and to two earlier cases as follows: "Income may be defined as the gain derived from capital, from labor, or from both combined, provided it be understood to include profit gained through a sale or conversion of capital assets." The Court then went into a lengthy explanation as to how this definition applies to a stock dividend. In the end, the Court decided that the stock dividend was not taxable, because it was merely a book adjustment and was not "severable" from the underlying stock. In other words, income would not be realized until the stock itself was sold.

=== Expansion in the definition of income ===
A number of commentators contended that the Court in Eisner v. Macomber had gone too far in overturning a statute taxing stock dividends (the 1916 Act) that many perceived as being fair and equitable. Henry Simons, a noted tax scholar of the time, in his treatise, observed the following:

Actually, an utterly trivial issue was made the occasion for injecting into our fundamental law a mass of rhetorical confusion which no orderly mind can contemplate respectfully, and for giving constitutional status to naive and ridiculous notions about the nature of income and the rationale for income taxes.

Despite this criticism, a number of decisions subsequent to Eisner v. Macomber relied on this definition of income. This in turn led to the question of whether or not this formulation was an "exclusive" definition of income, with any income not clearly covered by its terms deemed to be nontaxable.

In Hawkins v. Commissioner, the Internal Revenue Service argued that compensatory damages received by the taxpayer by way of settlement of a suit for injury to personal reputation and health caused by defamatory statements constituting libel or slander were taxable. While noting that "there may be cases in which taxable income will be judicially found although outside the precise scope of the description already given," the Board of Tax Appeals concluded that such damages would not be taxable. The Board noted that the injury was "wholly personal and nonpecuniary," and that the remedy simply attempts to make the individual whole. Thus, even though the payment was "severable" and lead to a demonstrable increase in net wealth, the Board nonetheless concluded that the payment was not income.

Other commentators noted that if "severability" were to be considered a touchstone for the definition of income, it followed that a number of sales or exchanges of property that did not involve immediate realization through severance would not be taxable. Realizing that the "one size fits all" definition of income in Eisner v. Macomber was too broad, the U.S. Supreme Court reconsidered the idea of severability in Helvering v. Bruun. In this case, the Court addressed the question of whether or not a lessor recognizes income from the receipt of a leasehold improvement made by a lessee during the lease when the improvement reverts to the lessor at the end of the lease. In ruling that the value of the improvement was taxable, the Court noted that not every gain need be realized in cash to be taxable. The court held that, "gain may occur as a result of exchange of property, payment of the taxpayer's indebtedness, relief from a liability, or other profit realized from the completion of a transaction." The court did not address whether the 16th amendment definition of income included the increase in value of property already held.

In subsequent cases, the U.S. Supreme Court distanced itself further from the Eisner v. Macomber definition of income and dependence of that definition on the concept of severability. For example, in Commissioner v. Glenshaw Glass Co., the Court ruled that punitive damages recovered under a violation of anti-trust laws were included in gross income, and that the language of Section 22 (now Internal Revenue Code Section 61) clearly showed the intent of Congress to exert "the full measure of its taxing power." In referencing its previous definition of income in Eisner v. Macomber, the Court noted that "in distinguishing gain from capital, the definition had served a useful purpose. But it was not meant to provide a touchstone to all future gross income questions."

== See also ==
- List of United States Supreme Court taxation and revenue case law
