= Irwin v. Gavit =

- Supreme Court of the United States

Argued April 15, 1925 Decided April 27, 1925
- Full case name: Irwin, Former Collector of Internal Revenue, v. Gavit
- Citations: 268 U.S. 161 (more) 45 S. Ct. 475; 69 L. Ed. 897; 1925 U.S. LEXIS 557; 1 U.S. Tax Cas. (CCH) ¶ 132A; 5 A.F.T.R. (P-H) 5380; 1925-1 C.B. 123; 1925 P.H. P8032

Case history
- Prior: Demurrer denied, 275 F. 643 (N.D.N.Y. 1921); affirmed, 295 F. 84 (2d Cir. 1923); cert. granted, 264 U.S. 579 (1924).

Holding
- The income paid from a trust or estate is taxable, even where the bequest of the entire corpus of the trust would be considered a gift.

Court membership
- Chief Justice William H. Taft Associate Justices Oliver W. Holmes Jr. · Willis Van Devanter; James C. McReynolds · Louis Brandeis; George Sutherland · Pierce Butler; Edward T. Sanford · Harlan F. Stone

Case opinions
- Majority: Holmes, joined by Taft, Stone, Van Devanter, McReynolds, Brandeis, Sanford
- Dissent: Sutherland, joined by Butler

Laws applied
- Internal Revenue Code

Irwin v. Gavit, 268 U.S. 161 (1925), was a case before the U.S. Supreme Court regarding the taxability, under United States tax law, of a divided interest in a bequest. It is notable (and thus appears frequently in law school casebooks) for the following holding:

- A bequest of income from property held in trust is taxable, even where the bequest of the entire corpus of the trust would be excluded as a gift.

== Facts and procedural history ==
Under Anthony N. Brady's will, a sixth of his estate would be held in trust for his granddaughter until she turned 21. During this period, her father would receive some of the income on this principal—in other words, he held an income interest in a testamentary trust for 15 years, with the remainder to his daughter.

The Collector viewed these payments as income, because they constituted the income on principal. Plaintiff argued they were exempt under §102(a) as property acquired by bequest.

He sued the Commissioner of Internal Revenue (Irwin) in the United States District Court for the Northern District of New York, which found for the plaintiff. The Second Circuit affirmed. The Commissioner appealed to the Supreme Court.

== Issue ==
Is a gift of future income on an estate includable as income (because the bequest is made of the income of the estate and not the estate itself)?

== Majority opinion ==
"[W]e can perceive no distinction relevant to the question before us between a gift of the fund for life and a gift of the income from it." The Code provision excluding gifts and bequests "assumes the gift of a corpus and contrasts it with the income arising from it, but was not intended to exempt income properly so-called. ... "

The Internal Revenue Code at the time provided that while the gains, profits and income "derived from any source whatsoever" was taxable, the value of property acquired by gift or bequest was not to be included in taxable income, and that trustees could be required to account for and withhold certain amounts for the payment of tax.

Justice Holmes, writing for the majority, reasoned that the statute as then written required that the income received by trustees and paid to the remainderman be considered taxable income. Holmes held that although the receipt of the estate funds would be considered a non-taxable bequest, the receipt of income from those funds in installments is taxable.

=== Reasoning ===
Under the statute:

- §2(A)(1), provides for a tax upon "the entire net income arising or accruing from all sources." (Holmes: These payments seem to be the type of "income" intended by Congress. Eisner v. Macomber.)
- §2(B): net income includes "gains or profits and income derived from any source whatever, including the income from but not the value of property acquired by gift, bequest, devise or descent."
- §2(D): trustees shall make "return of the net income of the person for whom they act, subject to this tax;" and trustees and others, having the control or payment of fixed or determinable gains, etc., of another person who are required to render a return on behalf of another are "authorized to withhold enough to pay the normal tax."

The language quoted leaves no doubt in our minds that if a fund were given to trustees for A for life with remainder over, the income received by the trustees and paid over to A would be income of A under the statute. It seems to us hardly less clear that even if there were a specific provision that A should have no interest in the corpus, the payments would be income none the less, within the meaning of the statute and the Constitution, and by popular speech. In the first case it is true that the bequest might be said to be of the corpus for life, in the second it might be said to be of the income. But we think that the provision of the act that exempts bequests assumes the gift of a corpus and contrasts it with the income arising from it, but was not intended to exempt income property so-called simply because of a severance between it and the principal fund. No such conclusion can be drawn from Eisner v. Macomber, 252 U.S. 189, 206, 207 S., 40 S. Ct. 189, 9 A. L. R. 1570. The money was income in the hands of the trustees and we know of nothing in the law that prevented its being paid and received as income by the donee.

== Dissent ==
Justice Sutherland dissented, rejecting Holmes' distinction between the income from the trust and the trust itself, and suggesting that the majority stretched the meaning of the statute too far. He wrote that money is itself property, and therefore the money paid to Marcia Ann Gavit should also be considered part of the bequest:

The corpus of the estate was not the legacy which respondent received, but merely the source which gave rise to it. The money here sought to be taxed was not the fruits of a legacy; it was the legacy itself.

== Academic Commentary ==
Gavit implies that the §102(a) exclusion goes to the remainderman alone, because he is treated as owning the corpus. In holding that trust income cannot be excluded by an income beneficiary (e.g. life-tenant), "the Court in effect decided not merely how much should be taxed, but to whom." But why not divide the realization of the income somehow between the several heirs? For example:

- Since the life-tenant's interest is a "wasting asset," tax her life-estate/life-tenancy as an annuity, with a present value (at any given time) equal to the present value of the future payments -- an amount she could "recover ratably" each year.
- The value of the remainder likewise grows from year to year; that could count as annual income, taxed to the remainderman -- but also added to the basis of his remainder interest (as if he had purchased an endowment policy -- but, as we don't tax the income accumulating interest on an endowment policy until it matures, the remainderman should likewise be permitted to defer this "income" until it "matures")

== See also ==
- Early v. Commissioner
- Eisner v. Macomber
- Towne v. Eisner
- List of United States Supreme Court cases, volume 268
