= List of United States Supreme Court cases, volume 102 =

Supreme Court of the United States
- Interactive map of Supreme Court of the United States
- 38°53′26″N 77°00′16″W
- Established: March 4, 1789; 236 years ago
- Location: Washington, D.C.
- Coordinates: 38°53′26″N 77°00′16″W
- Composition method: Presidential nomination with Senate confirmation
- Authorised by: Constitution of the United States, Art. III, § 1
- Judge term length: life tenure, subject to impeachment and removal
- Number of positions: 9 (by statute)
- Website: supremecourt.gov

This is a list of cases reported in volume 102 of United States Reports, decided by the Supreme Court of the United States from 1879 to 1881.

== Justices of the Supreme Court at the time of 102 U.S. ==
The Supreme Court is established by Article III, Section 1 of the Constitution of the United States, which says: "The judicial Power of the United States, shall be vested in one supreme Court . . .". The size of the Court is not specified; the Constitution leaves it to Congress to set the number of justices. Under the Judiciary Act of 1789 Congress originally fixed the number of justices at six (one chief justice and five associate justices). Since 1789 Congress has varied the size of the Court from six to seven, nine, ten, and back to nine justices (always including one chief justice).

When the cases in 102 U.S. were decided the Court comprised nine of the following ten members at one time (William Burnham Woods replaced William Strong in January 1881):

Portrait	Justice	Office	Home State	Succeeded	Date confirmed by the Senate (Vote)	Tenure on Supreme Court
	Morrison Waite	Chief Justice	Ohio	Salmon P. Chase	January 21, 1874 (63–0)	March 4, 1874 – March 23, 1888 (Died)
	Nathan Clifford	Associate Justice	Maine	Benjamin Robbins Curtis	January 12, 1858 (26–23)	January 21, 1858 – July 25, 1881 (Died)
	Noah Haynes Swayne	Associate Justice	Ohio	John McLean	January 24, 1862 (38–1)	January 27, 1862 – January 24, 1881 (Retired)
	Samuel Freeman Miller	Associate Justice	Iowa	Peter Vivian Daniel	July 16, 1862 (Acclamation)	July 21, 1862 – October 13, 1890 (Died)
	Stephen Johnson Field	Associate Justice	California	newly created seat	March 10, 1863 (Acclamation)	May 10, 1863 – December 1, 1897 (Retired)
	William Strong	Associate Justice	Pennsylvania	Robert Cooper Grier	February 18, 1870 (No vote recorded)	March 14, 1870 – December 14, 1880 (Retired)
	Joseph P. Bradley	Associate Justice	New Jersey	newly created seat	March 21, 1870 (46–9)	March 23, 1870 – January 22, 1892 (Died)
	Ward Hunt	Associate Justice	New York	Samuel Nelson	December 11, 1872 (Acclamation)	January 9, 1873 – January 27, 1882 (Retired)
	John Marshall Harlan	Associate Justice	Kentucky	David Davis	November 29, 1877 (Acclamation)	December 10, 1877 – October 14, 1911 (Died)
	William Burnham Woods	Associate Justice	Georgia	William Strong	December 21, 1880 (39–8)	January 5, 1881 – May 14, 1887 (Died)

== Notable Case in 102 U.S. ==
=== Springer v. United States ===
In Springer v. United States, 102 U.S. 586 (1881), the Supreme Court upheld the federal income tax imposed under the Revenue Act of 1864. The Court rejected Springer's argument that the income tax imposed by the 1864 statute was a direct tax not apportioned among the states according to the population of each state, as required under Article One of the United States Constitution; it held that "direct taxes, within the meaning of the Constitution, are only capitation taxes, as expressed in that instrument, and taxes on real estate; and that the tax of which [Springer] complains is within the category of an excise or duty".

== Citation style ==
Under the Judiciary Act of 1789 the federal court structure at the time comprised District Courts, which had general trial jurisdiction; Circuit Courts, which had mixed trial and appellate (from the US District Courts) jurisdiction; and the United States Supreme Court, which had appellate jurisdiction over the federal District and Circuit courts—and for certain issues over state courts. The Supreme Court also had limited original jurisdiction (i.e., in which cases could be filed directly with the Supreme Court without first having been heard by a lower federal or state court). There were one or more federal District Courts and/or Circuit Courts in each state, territory, or other geographical region.

Bluebook citation style is used for case names, citations, and jurisdictions.

- "C.C.D." = United States Circuit Court for the District of . . .
  - e.g.,"C.C.D.N.J." = United States Circuit Court for the District of New Jersey
- "D." = United States District Court for the District of . . .
  - e.g.,"D. Mass." = United States District Court for the District of Massachusetts
- "E." = Eastern; "M." = Middle; "N." = Northern; "S." = Southern; "W." = Western
  - e.g.,"C.C.S.D.N.Y." = United States Circuit Court for the Southern District of New York
  - e.g.,"M.D. Ala." = United States District Court for the Middle District of Alabama
- "Ct. Cl." = United States Court of Claims
- The abbreviation of a state's name alone indicates the highest appellate court in that state's judiciary at the time.
  - e.g.,"Pa." = Supreme Court of Pennsylvania
  - e.g.,"Me." = Supreme Judicial Court of Maine

== List of cases in 102 U.S. ==
Case Name	Page & year	Opinion of the Court	Concurring opinion(s)	Dissenting opinion(s)	Lower Court	Disposition
Myer v. Western C. Co.	1 (1880)	Waite	none	none	C.C.D. Iowa	affirmed
Brooklyn C. & N.R.R. Co. v. National Bank	14 (1880)	Harlan	Bradley	none	C.C.S.D.N.Y.	affirmed
Wyoming Nat'l Bank v. Dayton	59 (1880)	Harlan	none	none	Sup. Ct. Terr. Wyo.	reversed
United States v. Peck	64 (1880)	Bradley	none	none	Ct. Cl.	affirmed
Casey v. Adams	66 (1880)	Waite	none	none	La.	affirmed
Kirk v. Hamilton	68 (1880)	Harlan	none	none	Sup. Ct. D.C.	affirmed
Gay v. Alter	79 (1880)	Bradley	none	none	C.C.D. La.	affirmed
Menasha v. Hazard	81 (1880)	Waite	none	none	C.C.E.D. Wis.	affirmed
Parks v. Booth	96 (1880)	Clifford	none	none	C.C.N.D. Ohio	affirmed
Brooks v. Burlington & S. Ry. Co.	107 (1880)	Waite	none	none	C.C.D. Iowa	rehearing denied
Giddings v. Northwestern M.L. Ins. Co.	108 (1880)	Swayne	none	none	C.C.N.D. Ill.	affirmed
Pearce v. Mulford	112 (1880)	Strong	none	none	C.C.S.D.N.Y.	reversed
Schoonmaker v. Gilmore	118 (1880)	Waite	none	none	Pa.	affirmed
Railway Co. v. Heck	120 (1880)	Waite	none	none	C.C.N.D. Ill.	affirmed
Banking Ass'n v. Insurance Ass'n	121 (1880)	Waite	none	none	C.C.D. La.	dismissed
Hayes v. Fischer	121 (1880)	Waite	none	none	C.C.S.D.N.Y.	dismissed
Tiernan v. Rinker	123 (1880)	Field	none	none	Tex.	affirmed
Ball v. Langles	128 (1880)	Strong	none	none	C.C.D. La.	affirmed
French v. Wade	132 (1880)	Waite	none	none	C.C.D. La.	affirmed
New Orleans et al. R.R. Co. v. Mississippi	135 (1880)	Harlan	none	Miller	Miss.	reversed
Langford v. Monteith	145 (1880)	Miller	none	none	Sup. Ct. Terr. Idaho	affirmed
Graham v. La Crosse & M.R.R. Co.	148 (1880)	Bradley	none	none	C.C.E.D. Wis.	affirmed
Seward v. Corneau	161 (1880)	Waite	none	none	C.C.D. La.	dismissed
Potter v. Third Nat'l Bank	163 (1880)	Harlan	none	none	C.C.N.D. Ill.	affirmed
Ivanhoe M. Co. v. Keystone C.M. Co.	167 (1880)	Miller	none	none	C.C.D. Cal.	affirmed
Jifkins v. Sweetzer	177 (1880)	Waite	none	none	C.C.W.D. Pa.	affirmed
Davenport & N. Ry. Co. v. Renwick	180 (1880)	Waite	none	none	Iowa	affirmed
Ex parte Perry	183 (1879)	Waite	none	none	C.C.S.D.N.Y.	mandamus denied
Greene Cnty. v. Daniel	187 (1880)	Waite	none	none	C.C.S.D. Ala.	affirmed
Recknagel v. Murphy	197 (1880)	Swayne	none	none	C.C.S.D.N.Y.	affirmed
The Clara	200 (1880)	Swayne	none	none	C.C.E.D.N.Y.	affirmed
Louisiana v. City of New Orleans	203 (1880)	Field	none	none	La.	affirmed
Solomon v. Arthur	208 (1880)	Bradley	none	none	C.C.S.D.N.Y.	affirmed
The Benefactor	214 (1880)	Waite	none	none	C.C.E.D.N.Y.	affirmed
Hentig v. Page	219 (1880)	Waite	none	none	C.C.D. Kan.	dismissed
Goodyear D.V. Co. v. Davis	222 (1880)	Strong	none	none	C.C.D. Mass.	affirmed
Garneau v. Dozier	230 (1880)	Strong	none	none	C.C.E.D. Mo.	affirmed
Heryford v. Davis	235 (1880)	Strong	none	Bradley	C.C.W.D. Mo.	reversed
Williams v. Bruffy	248 (1880)	Field	none	none	Va.	reversed
People's Bank v. Calhoun	256 (1880)	Miller	none	none	C.C.S.D. Ill.	affirmed
Rogers v. Palmer	263 (1880)	Miller	none	none	C.C.D. Minn.	reversed
Finch v. United States	269 (1880)	Swayne	none	none	Ct. Cl.	affirmed
Cincinnati et al. R.R. Co. v. Hamblen Cnty.	273 (1880)	Waite	none	none	Tenn.	affirmed
Buchanan v. City of Litchfield	278 (1880)	Harlan	none	none	C.C.S.D. Ill.	affirmed
City of Louisiana v. Wood	294 (1880)	Waite	none	none	C.C.E.D. Mo.	affirmed
Sims v. Everhardt	300 (1880)	Strong	none	none	C.C.D. Ind.	reversed
Hawley v. Upton	314 (1880)	Waite	none	none	C.C.D. Iowa	affirmed
Lanahan v. Sears	318 (1880)	Field	none	none	C.C.W.D. Tex.	affirmed
Clark v. United States	322 (1880)	Waite	none	none	Ct. Cl.	affirmed
Hunnicutt v. Peyton	333 (1880)	Strong	none	none	C.C.W.D. Tex.	reversed
Draper v. Davis	370 (1880)	Waite	none	none	Sup. Ct. D.C.	supersedeas set
United States v. Atherton	372 (1880)	Miller	none	none	C.C.D. Cal.	affirmed
Densmore v. Scofield	375 (1880)	Swayne	none	none	C.C.N.D. Ohio	affirmed
United States v. Schurz	378 (1880)	Miller	none	Waite	Sup. Ct. D.C.	reversed
Swain T. & Mfg. Co. v. Ladd	408 (1880)	Bradley	none	none	C.C.D. Mass.	affirmed
Daniels v. Tearney	415 (1880)	Swayne	none	none	Va. Cir. Ct.	affirmed
United States v. Knox	422 (1880)	Swayne	none	none	Sup. Ct. D.C.	affirmed
McElrath v. United States	426 (1880)	Harlan	none	none	Ct. Cl.	affirmed
Swift v. Smith	442 (1880)	Strong	none	none	C.C.N.D. Ill.	reversed
Pennsylvania Co. v. Roy	451 (1880)	Harlan	none	none	C.C.N.D. Ill.	reversed
Hall v. Law	461 (1880)	Field	none	none	C.C.D. Ind.	affirmed
Walker v. Reister	467 (1881)	Miller	none	none	C.C.E.D. Mo.	affirmed
Meriwether v. Garrett	472 (1880)	Waite	Field	Strong	C.C.W.D. Tenn.	reversed
Wadsworth v. Eau Claire Cnty.	534 (1881)	Harlan	none	none	C.C.W.D. Wis.	affirmed
Lord v. Goodall et al. Co.	541 (1881)	Waite	none	none	C.C.D. Cal.	affirmed
Connecticut G.L. Ins. Co. v. Eldredge	545 (1881)	Field	none	none	not indicated	affirmed
United States v. Pinson	548 (1881)	Harlan	none	none	C.C.W.D. Tenn.	affirmed
Goodman v. Niblack	556 (1881)	Miller	none	none	C.C.D. Ind.	reversed
George v. Tate	564 (1881)	Swayne	none	none	C.C.D. Kan.	affirmed
Wilson v. McNamee	572 (1881)	Swayne	none	none	N.Y.	affirmed
Edwards v. United States	575 (1880)	Waite	none	none	C.C.W.D. Mich.	dismissal denied
Bennett v. Louisville & N.R.R. Co.	577 (1881)	Harlan	none	none	C.C.D. Ky.	reversed
Springer v. United States	586 (1881)	Swayne	none	none	C.C.S.D. Ill.	affirmed
United States v. Chouteau	603 (1881)	Field	none	none	C.C.E.D. Mo.	affirmed
Cramer v. Arthur	612 (1881)	Bradley	none	none	C.C.S.D.N.Y.	affirmed
Auffm'ordt v. Rasin	620 (1881)	Miller	none	none	C.C.S.D.N.Y.	affirmed
United States v. Goldback	623 (1881)	Waite	none	none	C.C.E.D. Va.	affirmed
Wells v. Pontotoc Cnty.	625 (1880)	Waite	none	none	N.D. Miss.	affirmed
Ogden v. Daviess Cnty.	634 (1881)	Waite	none	none	C.C.W.D. Mo.	affirmed
Kahn v. Central S. Co.	641 (1881)	Field	none	none	Sup. Ct. Terr. Utah	reversed
Trimble v. Woodhead	647 (1881)	Miller	none	none	C.C.D. Ky.	affirmed
Barrett v. Holmes	651 (1881)	Woods	none	none	Iowa	affirmed
White v. Miner's Nat'l Bank	658 (1881)	Miller	none	none	C.C.D. Colo.	reversed
Third Nat'l Bank v. National Bank	663 (1881)	Miller	none	none	not indicated	reversed
Page v. Burnstine	664 (1881)	Harlan	Bradley	Bradley	Sup. Ct. D.C.	reversed
Hartman v. Greenhow	672 (1881)	Field	none	Miller	Va.	reversed
Sharpe v. Doyle	686 (1881)	Miller	none	none	N.Y. Super. Ct.	reversed
Mobile Cnty. v. Kimball	691 (1881)	Field	none	none	C.C.S.D. Ala.	affirmed
Tilghman v. Proctor	707 (1881)	Bradley	none	none	C.C.S.D. Ohio	reversed
