= Realization (tax) =

Realization, for U.S. Federal income tax purposes, is a requirement in determining what must be included as income subject to taxation. It should not be confused with the separate concept of Recognition (tax). Whether realization is a constitutional requirement for taxation of income is an open question, and it is relevant to the imposition of a wealth tax.

== Income ==
Realization is a trigger for calculating income taxation. It is one of the three principles for defining income under the seminal case in this area of tax law, Commissioner v. Glenshaw Glass Co. In that case, the Supreme Court interpreted a statute under the tax code and determined that income generally means "undeniable accessions to wealth, clearly realized, and over which the taxpayers have complete dominion." It is also discussed in Helvering v. Bruun, in which the court explained that "the realization of gain need not be in cash derived from the sale of an asset. Gain may occur as a result of exchange of property, payment of the taxpayer's indebtedness, relief from a liability, or other profit realized from the completion of a transaction." That is a checklist of types of realization triggers, but it is not an exhaustive list. For instance, merely finding something of value can be a realization trigger, as the case of Cesarini v. United States demonstrates.

In Cottage Savings Ass'n v. Commissioner, 499 U.S. 554, 559 (1991), the Supreme Court, interpreting section 1001(a) of the tax code, stated:

In order to avoid the cumbersome, abrasive, and unpredictable administrative task of valuing assets annually to determine whether their value has appreciated or depreciated, § 1001(a) of the Code defers the tax consequences of a gain or loss in property until it is realized through the "sale or disposition of [the] property." This rule serves administrative convenience because a change in the investment's form or extent can be easily detected by a taxpayer or an administrative officer.

== As a constitutional requirement ==
The question of whether income must be realized in order to be subject to income taxation under the Sixteenth Amendment to the United States Constitution, is presently unresolved. The assertion that realization is constitutionally required is drawn from Eisner v. Macomber, in which the Court struck down a tax on stock dividends because of a lack of realization event. However, it has been noted that Macomber has been narrowed and undermined. Proponents of a realization argument further source their assertion in textualist interpretations of the Sixteenth Amendment. There have also been some assertions that a tax on unrealized gains, typically in the form of a wealth tax, would violate the Due Process Clause of the Fourteenth Amendment.

The Supreme Court granted certiorari on this question in the case of Moore v. United States, but ultimately declined to decide the issue. Writing for the majority, Justice Brett Kavanaugh stated that the court "need not resolve that disagreement over realization" because the Moore's income was, in fact, realized.

Justice Ketanji Brown Jackson, writing in a concurrence, agreed. However, she engaged with the argument over whether realization is required, indicating that the term "income" "was widely recognized as flexible enough to include both realized and unrealized gains" at the time the Amendment was drafted. She further stated, citing Cottage Savings Assn. v. Commissioner, that realization is not a constitutional requirement but a matter of administrative convenience.

Justice Amy Coney Barrett, writing in a concurrence, disagreed with Jackson's interpretation of the term "income." Under the Sixteenth Amendment, she argued, taxation of income required gain to "derive" from a source. She further argued that for income to be derived from a source, it must necessarily be realized. In a dissenting opinion, Justice Clarence Thomas agreed. He argued that "the text and history of the Amendment make clear that it requires a distinction between 'income' and the 'source' from which that income is 'derived.'" Citing Macomber, he stated that "the only way to draw such a distinction is with a realization requirement."

In light of the differing opinions of the justices, the future of a tax on unrealized gains is unclear. Tax law scholars David Gamage, John Brooks, and Edward McCaffery posit that Moore limits Macomber to its facts and that some versions of a realization requirement are "difficult to square" with Moore's holding. This is because any future realization requirement must "allow for the idea that the income in Moore was realized." They further note that there are potential methods to achieve the functional equivalent of a tax on unrealized gains without running foul of such a realization requirement.

Other scholars posit that, at least in the context of a wealth tax, realization is required not by the Sixteenth Amendment but by Article One of the United States Constitution. Tax law scholars David Schizer and Steven Calabresi argue that such a tax would necessarily be a direct tax under Article One and that it is therefore subject to apportionment. This is because, in their view, Article One only allows a tax to be indirect if it is on a transaction. Under this reasoning, if there is no realization event, there can be no transaction.

== Problems in line-drawing ==
Realization is generally straightforward, but there are instances at the margins in which the moment of realization can be tricky. One example of a tricky realization situation that has given rise to substantial debate is the 62nd home run ball hit by Mark McGwire. The ball was retrieved by a grounds crewman, Tim Forneris. Forneris gave McGwire the ball immediately after the game amid speculation that the ball could fetch at least $1 million in an auction. Did either McGwire or Forneris have gross income? Did Forneris realize income when he caught the ball? Tax professors typically teach that it was income to Forneris when he caught it because it was treasure trove. As a result, the person who catches a home run ball would generally be required to include the value of the ball in income in the year in which the catch took place, whether or not the person sold the ball and even whether he gave it back to the player or the team, or even destroyed it.

This is an unpopular result and the Internal Revenue Service (IRS) issued Ruling 98-56 to change the result in the face of public pressure, but only in the case in which the player returned the ball. Under that theory, an individual who catches a record-breaking ball has income at the very moment he possesses it unless he immediately disclaims possession by returning it to the player or team. If he does not do that, the only remaining question is what value he ought to include in income of the next tax return. Because the treasure trove rule is that the value at the time the ball is "reduced to possession," the answer must be a reasonable estimate of its market value, whether or not the recipient sells the ball.

== See also ==
- Amount Realized
