= NLRB v. Jones & Laughlin Steel Corp. =

1937 U.S. Supreme Court labor case

National Labor Relations Board v. Jones & Laughlin Steel Corporation
- Supreme Court of the United States

Argued February 10–11, 1937 Decided April 12, 1937
- Full case name: National Labor Relations Board v. Jones & Laughlin Steel Corporation
- Citations: 301 U.S. 1 (more) 57 S. Ct. 615; 81 L. Ed. 893; 1937 U.S. LEXIS 1122; 1 Lab. Cas. (CCH) ¶ 17,017; 1 Empl. Prac. December (CCH) ¶ 9601; 108 A.L.R. 1352; 1 L.R.R.M. 703

Case history
- Prior: Jones & Laughlin Steel Corp., 1 NLRB 503, enforcement denied by NLRB v. Jones & Laughlin Steel Corp., 83 F.2d 998 (5th Cir. 1936), cert. granted, 299 U.S. 534 (1936)
- Subsequent: None

Holding
- Congress had the power, under the Commerce Clause, to regulate labor relations. The National Labor Relations Act only applied to industries that impacted interstate commerce (either directly or indirectly) and that was sufficient for the act to stand. Even purely intrastate disputes between management and labor would fall under the jurisdiction of the act, as a negative relation between the two could negatively impact interstate commerce.

Court membership
- Chief Justice Charles E. Hughes Associate Justices Willis Van Devanter · James C. McReynolds; Louis Brandeis · George Sutherland; Pierce Butler · Harlan F. Stone; Owen Roberts · Benjamin N. Cardozo

Case opinions
- Majority: Hughes, joined by Brandeis, Stone, Roberts, Cardozo
- Dissent: McReynolds, joined by Van Devanter, Sutherland, Butler

Laws applied
- U.S. Const. art. I, § 8, cl. 3 (the Commerce Clause); U.S. Const. amend. V (the Due Process Clause); National Labor Relations Act of 1935, 29 U.S.C. § 151 et seq.

National Labor Relations Board v Jones & Laughlin Steel Corporation, 301 U.S. 1 (1937), is a landmark decision of the Supreme Court of the United States that upheld the constitutionality of the National Labor Relations Act of 1935, also known as the Wagner Act. The case marked a major expansion in the Court's interpretation of Congress's power under the Commerce Clause and effectively spelled the end to the Court's striking down of New Deal economic legislation.

The case arose after the National Labor Relations Board (NLRB) ordered Jones & Laughlin Steel to rehire workers who had been fired for seeking to unionize. Jones and Laughlin refused to comply on the grounds that the Wagner Act, which had established the NLRB, was unconstitutional.

In a 5–4 decision, Chief Justice Charles Evans Hughes upheld the constitutionality of the Wagner Act, holding that Congress could regulate economic activities that were "intrastate in character when separately considered" if they held "such a close and substantial relation to interstate commerce that their control is essential or appropriate to protect that commerce from burdens and obstructions." In his dissent, Associate Justice James Clark McReynolds argued that Congress's power to regulate interstate commerce should be limited to cases in which a violation is "direct and material."

== Background ==
Jones & Laughlin Steel, the fourth largest steel producer in the United States, was charged with discriminating against workers who wanted to join the Steel Workers Organizing Committee (SWOC). The company had fired ten employees at its plant in Aliquippa, Pennsylvania, after they moved to unionize. The NLRB ruled against the company and ordered the workers be rehired and given back pay, but Jones & Laughlin refused to comply on the grounds and believed the Act to be unconstitutional. Citing Supreme Court precedent, lower courts agreed.

== Decision ==
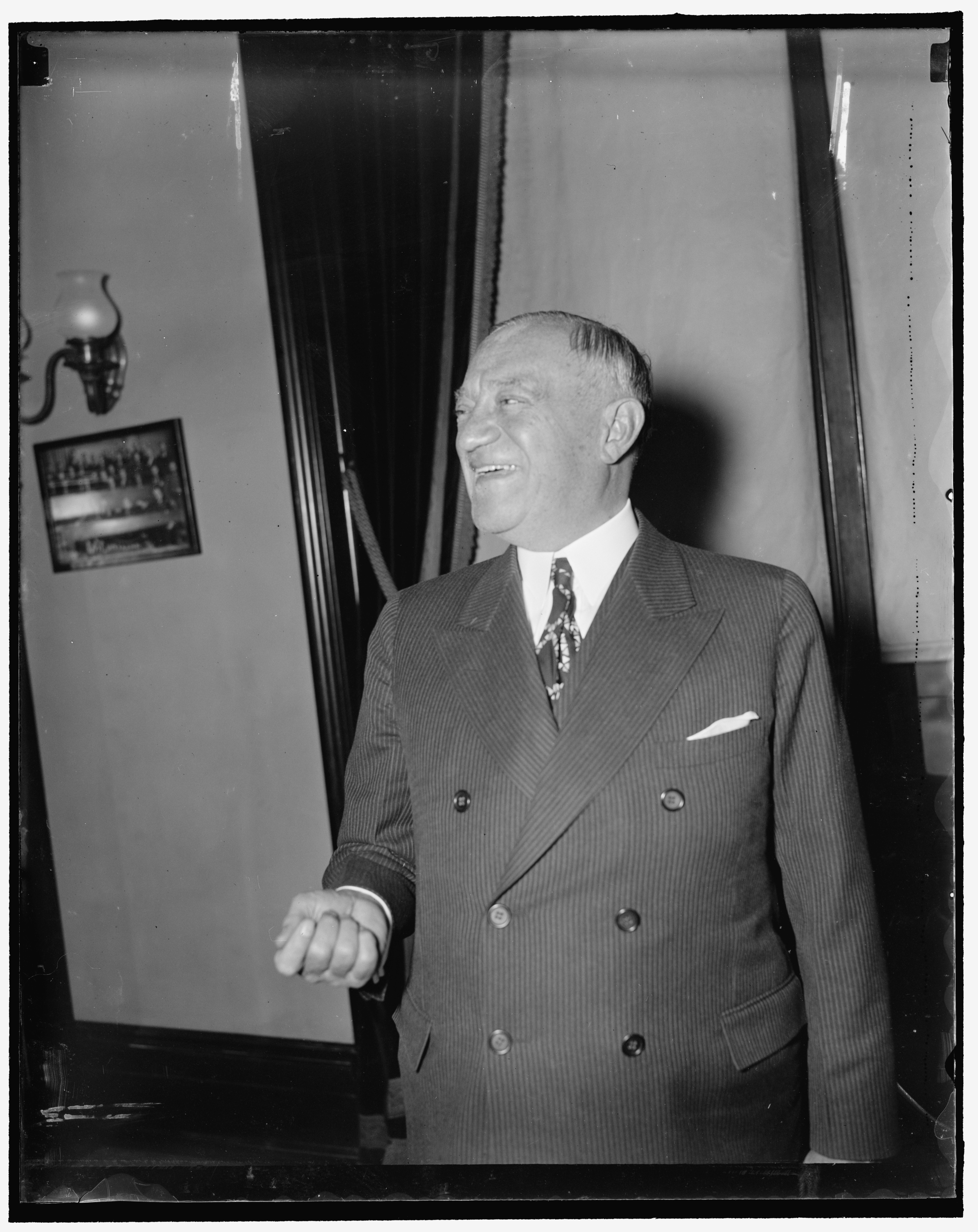
Senator Robert F. Wagner was happy over the Supreme Court decision

Chief Justice Charles Evans Hughes wrote the majority opinion in the case, which reversed the lower court's ruling, in a 5–4 decision:

...the statute goes no further than to safeguard the right of employees to self-organization and to select representatives of their own choosing for collective bargaining or other mutual protection without restraint or coercion by their employer.

That is a fundamental right. Employees have as clear a right to organize and select their representatives for lawful purposes as the respondent has to organize its business and select its own officers and agents. Discrimination and coercion to prevent the free exercise of the right of employees to self-organization and representation is a proper subject for condemnation by competent legislative authority. Long ago we stated the reason for labor organizations. We said that they were organized out of the necessities of the situation; that a single employee was helpless in dealing with an employer; that he was dependent ordinarily on his daily wage for the maintenance of himself and family; that, if the employer refused to pay him the wages that he thought fair, he was nevertheless unable to leave the employ and resist arbitrary and unfair treatment; that union was essential to give laborers opportunity to deal on an equality with their employer. American Steel Foundries v. Tri-City Central Trades Council, 257 U.S. 184, 209... We reiterated these views when we had under consideration the Railway Labor Act of 1926, 44 Stat. 577. Fully recognizing the legality of collective action on the part of employees in order to safeguard their proper interests, we said that Congress was not required to ignore this right but could safeguard it. Congress could seek to make appropriate collective action of employees an instrument of peace rather than of strife. We said that such collective action would be a mockery if representation were made futile by interference with freedom of choice. Hence the prohibition by Congress of interference with the selection of representatives for the purpose of negotiation and conference between employers and employees, 'instead of being an invasion of the constitutional right of either, was based on the recognition of the rights of both.' Texas & N.O.R. Co. v. Railway & S.S. Clerks, supra. We have reasserted the same principle in sustaining the application of the Railway Labor Act as amended in 1934 (45 U.S.C.A. § 151 et seq.). Virginian Railway Co. v. System Federation, No. 40, supra.

...

Although activities may be intrastate in character when separately considered, if they have such a close and substantial relation to interstate commerce that their control is essential or appropriate to protect that commerce from burdens and obstructions, Congress cannot be denied the power to exercise that control.

Justice McReynolds dissented, questioning Congress's enhanced power under the Commerce Clause. Although he did not dispute Congress's regulation of commerce between the states, he stated that Congress's interference should be in cases where a violation is "direct and material." McReynolds stated that taxation on property, for example, may indirectly but seriously affect the cost of transportation. He concluded that Congress had transcended the power granted to it by the Constitution.
