= Nonrecognition provisions =

Tax code provision

According to section 1001(c) of the Internal Revenue Code (IRC § 1001(c)), all realized gains and losses must be recognized "except as otherwise provided in this subtitle." While the general rule of recognition applies in most cases, there are actually several exceptions located throughout the Internal Revenue Code. These exceptions are commonly referred to as nonrecognition provisions.

== Common themes ==
Nonrecognition provision generally have two common themes. First, nonrecognition is conferred because it is said that the sale or exchange at issue usually involves a mere change in the form of an investment and not a change in the substance of that investment. Second, the realized gain or loss usually never disappears: the unrecognized gain or loss typically carries into the new asset. When the new asset is sold or exchanged in a taxable transaction, the realized gain or loss from the first transaction will then be recognized. Preservation of the unrecognized gain or loss is accomplished by giving the new asset a cost basis equal to the adjusted basis of the old asset. Therefore, when you see a nonrecognition provision, you should expect to see some basis mechanism within that provision that preserves the unrecognized gain or loss.

== Examples ==
Many of the nonrecognition provision are set forth in part III of subchapter O (Sec. 1031-1045) of the Internal Revenue Code. There are two common examples of such basis mechanisms. First, the gift basis provision in §1015 provides that the gift recipient is to take the donor's basis. A second, similar, mechanism exists in §1041, requiring the recipient of marital property in a divorce settlement to take the basis of the transferring spouse. The good news is that the recipient in both cases has received a "free" gift. The bad news is that since the Internal Revenue Code requires the recipient to take the donor's basis, the formula for gain (i.e. Gain = amount received – adjusted basis) will use the lower basis amount resulting in higher gain. Therefore, the taxpayer will likely incur the same (higher) tax liability that the donor would have paid if they had kept the property for themselves. Alternatively, a more favorable rule to taxpayers would have allowed the taxpayer to take the fair market value at the time of the gift as the basis. This amount would likely be higher. When used in the gain formula, the higher basis would result in lower gain and, therefore, a lower tax liability.

The three most significant nonrecognition provisions are:
• Like-kind exchange
• Involuntary conversions
• Transfers between spouses and certain former spouses
