= Cottage Savings Ass'n v. Commissioner =

Cottage Savings Association v. Commissioner
- Supreme Court of the United States

Argued January 15, 1991 Decided April 17, 1991
- Full case name: Cottage Savings Association v. Commissioner of Internal Revenue
- Citations: 499 U.S. 554 (more) 111 S. Ct. 1503; 113 L. Ed. 2d 589; 1991 U.S. LEXIS 2224; 59 U.S.L.W. 4314; 91-1 U.S. Tax Cas. (CCH) ¶ 50,187; 67 A.F.T.R.2d (RIA) 808; 91 Cal. Daily Op. Service 2736; 91 Daily Journal DAR 4403

Case history
- Prior: U.S. Tax Court found for petitioner, 90 T.C. 372; reversed, 890 F.2d 848 (6th Cir. 1990).

Holding
- Gain or loss under the Internal Revenue Code is realized and recognized when property is disposed of for property which is "materially different", i.e. when their respective possessors enjoy different legal entitlements from each. Deduction of loss here was permissible.

Court membership
- Chief Justice William Rehnquist Associate Justices Byron White · Thurgood Marshall; Harry Blackmun · John P. Stevens; Sandra Day O'Connor · Antonin Scalia; Anthony Kennedy · David Souter

Case opinions
- Majority: Marshall, joined by Rehnquist, Stevens, O'Connor, Scalia, Kennedy, Souter
- Dissent: Blackmun, joined by White

Laws applied
- 26 U.S.C. § 165, 26 U.S.C. § 1001(a)

Cottage Savings Association v. Commissioner, 499 U.S. 554 (1991), was an income tax case before the Supreme Court of the United States.

The Court was asked to determine whether the exchange of different participation interests in home mortgages by a savings and loan association was a "disposition of property" under § 1001(a) of the Internal Revenue Code (since this was the requirement for them to realize, and deduct, their losses on these mortgages).

The Court determined that it was a "disposition of property" by making the following three holdings:

- Under § 1001(a), exchange of property gives rise to realization (a "disposition of property") only if the exchanged properties are "materially different."
- This concept of "material difference" is not defined by an economic substitute test (whether various parties would consider their differences to be "material"); rather, two properties are materially different if their respective possessors enjoy legal entitlements that are different in kind or extent.
- The S&L's 90% participation interest in its mortgages embodied legally distinct entitlements (and so was "materially different" from) the 90% mortgage participation interest it received from the other savings associations. Even if mortgages are "substantially identical" for purposes of Federal Home Loan Bank Board "Memorandum R-49" on reporting losses, they can still exhibit "material difference" for the purposes of finding a "disposition of property."

== Background ==
Cottage Savings Association was a savings & loan association (S&L) serving the Greater Cincinnati area. Like many other S&L's, Cottage Savings had a large number of long-term, low-interest mortgages on its books, which declined in value as interest rates increased during the late 1970s.

These S&Ls could have achieved a tax savings from selling these mortgages at a loss, but they were dissuaded from doing so because the accounting regulations of the Federal Home Loan Bank Board (FHLBB) would have required them to report these losses on their books, possibly putting them into insolvency. Hoping to find another way for these S&Ls to realize their tax losses, the FHLBB promulgated a new regulation called "Memorandum R-49", under which the S&Ls would not have to show a loss on their books if they exchanged their mortgages for "substantially identical" mortgages held by other lenders.

Cottage Savings made a transaction pursuant to this regulation by exchanging 90% participation interests in 252 mortgages to four other S&Ls, receiving in return 90% participation interests in 305 mortgages. All the mortgages involved in the transaction were for homes in the Greater Cincinnati region. The fair market value of the interests exchanged by each side was approximately $4.5 million. The face value of the interests which Cottage Savings relinquished was approximately $6.9 million. On its 1980 federal income tax return, Cottage Savings claimed a loss of $2,447,091, the adjusted difference between the face value of the participation interests it gave up and fair market value of the interests it received.

The Commissioner of Internal Revenue disallowed Cottage Savings' deduction, so the S&L filed a petition for redetermination in the United States Tax Court, which reversed the Commissioner's decision and permitted the deduction. The Commissioner appealed to the United States Court of Appeals for the Sixth Circuit, which reversed the decision of the Tax Court, holding that even though Cottage Savings realized a loss in the transaction, it had not actually realized the loss during the 1980 tax year. The U.S. Supreme Court then granted certiorari.

== Issues ==
§ 1001(a) of the Internal Revenue Code requires that the tax consequences of a gain or loss in property value be deferred until it is realized by "the sale or other disposition of property". Since the transaction was certainly not a sale, the Court identified the main legal issue to be whether the exchange was a "disposition of property."

- The Commissioner had argued that an exchange of properties can be a "disposition" only if the properties involved in the transaction are "materially different".
- Cottage Savings argued that "material difference" was not a requirement—that any exchange of property could be considered a disposition. Just in case, it also argued that the participation interests exchange were materially different because they were secured by different real property.

Thus, to determine whether the exchange was a "disposition of property," the court first had to determine whether §1001 incorporated a "material difference" requirement, and if so, what that requirement involved.

== Opinion of the Court ==
In an opinion by Justice Marshall, the Court came to three key findings:

Material difference is a requirement for a disposition under §1001. Justice Marshall cited Treasury Regulation §1.1001-1 (26 CFR 1.1001-1), which required that an exchange of materially different properties constitutes a realization under the Tax Code. Congress delegated to the Commissioner the authority to make rules and regulations to enforce the Internal Revenue Code. Because Title 26 of the Code of Federal Regulations represents the Commissioner's interpretation of the Code, the Court deferred to the Commissioner's judgment, holding that the regulation was a reasonable interpretation of the Code and consonant with prior case law.

Material difference defined. Justice Marshall defined what constituted a "material difference" in property under §1001 by examination at what point "realization" had been found in past case law. He started with Eisner v. Macomber (1920), which dealt with exchange of stock in corporations. In several cases after Eisner, the court held that an exchange of stock which occurred when a corporation reorganized in another state was a realization, because corporations have different rights and power in different states. Marshall reasoned that properties materially differ for tax purposes when their respective possessors enjoy different legal entitlements from each. As long as the properties being exchanged were not identical, a realization had taken place. This was a simpler, black letter rule, as compared to what the Commissioner was arguing for, which would have examined not just the underlying substance of the transaction, but also the market and other non-tax regulations.

The properties exchanged were "materially different." Justice Marshall held that the participation interests exchanged by Cottage Savings and the other S&Ls were "materially different" because the loans involved were made to different obligors and secured by different properties. Even though the interests were "substantially identical" for the FHLBB's purposes, that did not mean they were not materially different for taxation purposes. Therefore, the exchange was a "disposition of property," Cottage Savings had realized a loss, and their deduction was appropriate.

The Court agreed that "material difference" is the applicable test of realization under Code § 1001(a), but it did not agree that that test had been flunked merely because the properties exchanged were economic substitutes or equivalents. While the test for regulatory purposes might indeed be one of economic substance, for tax purposes the question was one of administrative convenience only. As the mortgages exchanged were secured by different homes and involved different mortgage borrowers, the banks on either side emerged with "legally distinct entitlements". More important, the swap itself sufficed to meet the administrative aims that underlie the realization requirement. The transaction was an arms-length deal between unrelated parties. As such, it "put both Cottage Savings and the Commissioner in a position to determine the change in the value of Cottage Savings' mortgages relative to their tax bases" and thus to reckon up gain or loss under § 1001(a).

— Marvin Chirelstein, Federal Income Taxation, A Law Student's Guide

=== Dissent ===
Justice Blackmun dissented, joined by Justice White.

- First, Blackmun wanted to define "material difference" with reference to how the term "materiality" was defined. In TSC Industries, Inc. v. Northway, Inc. (1976), Justice Marshall himself had stated, in the context of securities fraud, that an omitted fact is material if there is a substantial likelihood that a reasonable shareholder would consider it important in deciding how to vote. By implication, a material difference is a difference capable of influencing the decision made by the parties to the transaction.
- Second, Blackmun pointed out that the majority created something of an anomaly by allowing the property interests exchanged here to be "identical" for accounting purposes but "different" for tax purposes.
- Finally, he explained that he felt the substance of the transactions, including the fact that Cottage Savings retained a 10% interest in loans it traded away so it could continue servicing them, did not point to any real difference that should permit the allowance of a deduction.

== Academic Commentary ==
The emphasis in Cottage Savings on realization as an administrative requirement makes evident the capricious role that realization plays in the tax field.

- If the realization requirement can be met at a very low threshold, as the decision implies, then "realization" virtually becomes elective with the taxpayer.
- The hazard of elective or voluntary realization arises in connection with much investment activity.
  - To prevent an investor from selling underwater assets to deduct realized losses from gross income without restriction, the Code permits the investor to offset so-called capital losses only against his realized capital gains. (Unused losses may be carried forward to subsequent years.) Investment losses are thus confined by the Code to a separate schedule, and so isolated from other kinds of taxable income.

== See also ==
- List of United States Supreme Court cases, volume 499
- Lists of United States Supreme Court cases
- Lists of United States Supreme Court cases by volume
- List of United States Supreme Court cases by the Rehnquist Court
