= Eisner v. Macomber =

- Supreme Court of the United States

Argued April 16, 1919 Reargued October 17–20, 1919 Decided March 8, 1920
- Full case name: Mark Eisner, as Collector of United States Internal Revenue for the Third District of the State of New York v. Myrtle H. Macomber
- Citations: 252 U.S. 189 (more) 40 S. Ct. 189; 64 L. Ed. 521; 1920 U.S. LEXIS 1605; 1 U.S. Tax Cas. (CCH) ¶ 32; 3 A.F.T.R. (P-H) 3020; 1920-3 C.B. 25; 9 A.L.R. 1570

Case history
- Prior: Error to the District Court of the United States for the Southern District of New York

Holding
- A pro rata stock dividend in which a shareholder received no actual cash or other property and retained the same proportionate share of ownership of the corporation as was held prior to the dividend was not income to the shareholder within the meaning of the Sixteenth Amendment. An income tax imposed by the Revenue Act of 1916 on such a dividend was unconstitutional even if the dividend indirectly represented accrued earnings of the corporation.

Court membership
- Chief Justice Edward D. White Associate Justices Joseph McKenna · Oliver W. Holmes Jr. William R. Day · Willis Van Devanter; Mahlon Pitney · James C. McReynolds; Louis Brandeis · John H. Clarke

Case opinions
- Majority: Pitney, joined by White, McKenna, Van Devanter, McReynolds
- Dissent: Holmes, joined by Day
- Dissent: Brandeis, joined by Clarke

Laws applied
- Sixteenth Amendment

Eisner v. Macomber, 252 U.S. 189 (1920), was a tax case before the United States Supreme Court that is notable for the following holdings:

- A pro rata stock dividend where a shareholder received no actual cash or other property and retained the same proportionate share of ownership of the corporation as was held prior to the dividend by the shareholder was not income to the shareholder under the Sixteenth Amendment.
- An income tax that was imposed by the Revenue Act of 1916 on such a dividend was unconstitutional even if the dividend indirectly represented accrued earnings of the corporation.

== Prior cases ==
In 1895, the Supreme Court held in Pollock v. Farmers' Loan & Trust Co. that a tax from income on property, unlike a tax on income from employment or vocations, had to be proportionate to the states' congressional representation. In 1913, the United States ratified the Sixteenth Amendment, which allowed taxation of income without regard to source (income from either property or vocations and employment) and without regard to a state's Congressional representation.

In 1918, the Court, in Towne v. Eisner 245 U.S. 418 (1918), had addressed a nearly-identical situation to one in Eisner v. Macomber. (Eisner was responsible for Internal Revenue Collection in both cases).

However, in the aftermath of Towne v. Eisner, the US Congress passed a revenue collection statute that specifically stated that stock dividends were to be considered as income.

== Facts ==
Myrtle H. Macomber owned 2,200 shares in Standard Oil, which declared a 50% stock dividend. She received 1,100 additional shares, about $20,000 in par value of which represented earnings accumulated by the company, recapitalized rather than distributed, since the effective date of the original tax law.

The current statute expressly included stock dividends in income, and the government contended that the certificates should be taxed as income to Macomber as if the corporation had distributed money to her. She sued Mark Eisner, the Collector of Internal Revenue, for a refund.

=== Economic substance of a stock dividend ===
The stock dividend in this case was the economic equivalent of a stock split, a transaction in which the corporation multiplies the total number of shares outstanding but gives the new shares to shareholders in proportion to the number that they had held. For example, if a corporation declares a "two for one" stock split and distributes no money or other property to any stockholder, a stockholder who held 100 shares at $4 per share will now hold 200 shares with a value of $2 each, both of which with $400 in value.

=== Stock dividends vs. cash dividends ===
A shareholder's assets do not grow after this sort of stock dividend. Metaphorically, the "pie" is still the same size, but it has been sliced into more pieces, each piece being proportionately smaller. Of course, the same is true of a cash dividend: the shareholder gains cash, but the corporation that is represented by his shares has also lost cash. The shares thus implicitly decline in value by an equal amount.

A shareholder also makes no "sale or other disposition" of stock after this sort of stock dividend. The taxpayer still owns the same proportionate percentage of the corporation that was owned before the stock dividend. Again, that is true of a cash dividend as well.

However, several important factors distinguish a stock and cash dividend. "Overall, the aim of the tax law is to impose a tax on "dividends" when assets representing corporate earnings are transferred to the shareholders. Stock dividends, however, merely give the shareholders additional pieces of paper to represent the same equitable interest; they do not transfer assets or create new priorities among the security-holders. The total value of the common shares, though now spread out over a larger number of units, is left unchanged from its previous level. In effect, nothing of substance has occurred."

The issue in the case was the following:

Essentially, therefore, [i.e. in light of the fact that stock and cash dividends are economically equivalent,] the question in Macomber was not whether the shareholder had gain in an economic sense, but whether in legal or accounting terms the stock dividend was to be regarded as a taxable event.... Stripped of its Constitutional element, the issue in Eisner v. Macomber in the end comes down to a "battle of similarities." Is a stock dividend (as the majority held) "more like" a situation in which a corporation simply accumulates its earnings and makes no distribution at all? Or is it (as Brandeis thought) "more like" the receipt of a cash dividend which is followed by a reinvestment of the cash received in additional shares?

— Marvin Chirelstein, Federal Income Taxation, A Law Student's Guide

== Decision ==
In the majority opinion, Justice Mahlon Pitney ruled that the stock dividend was not a realization of income by the taxpayer-shareholder for the purposes of the Sixteenth Amendment:

We are clear that not only does a stock dividend really take nothing from the property of the corporation and add nothing to that of the shareholder, but that the antecedent accumulation of profits evidenced thereby, while indicating that the shareholder is richer because of an increase of his capital, at the same time shows he has not realized or received any income in the transaction.

The Court noted that in Towne v. Eisner, it had clearly stated that stock dividends were not income, as nothing of value was received by Towne; the company was not worth any less than it was when the dividend was declared, and the total value of Towne's stock had not changed.

Although the Court acknowledged the power of the Federal Government to tax income under the Sixteenth Amendment, it essentially said that Congress was not given the power to tax as income anything other than income. In others words, Congress did not have the power to redefine "income" as it appeared in the Constitution:

Throughout the argument of the Government, in a variety of forms, runs the fundamental error already mentioned—a failure to appraise correctly the force of the term "income" as used in the Sixteenth Amendment, or at least to give practical effect to it. Thus, the Government contends that the tax "is levied on income derived from corporate earnings," when in truth the stockholder has "derived" nothing except paper certificates which, so far as they have any effect, deny him [or "her" — in this case, Mrs. Macomber] present participation in such earnings. It [the government] contends that the tax may be laid when earnings "are received by the stockholder," whereas [s]he has received none; that the profits are "distributed by means of a stock dividend," although a stock dividend distributes no profits; that under the Act of 1916 "the tax is on the stockholder's share in corporate earnings," when in truth a stockholder has no such share, and receives none in a stock dividend; that "the profits are segregated from his [her] former capital, and [s]he has a separate certificate representing his [her] invested profits or gains," whereas there has been no segregation of profits, nor has [s]he any separate certificate representing a personal gain, since the certificates, new and old, are alike in what they represent—a capital interest in the entire concerns of the corporation.

The Court ordered that Macomber be refunded the tax she overpaid.

=== Dissents ===
In the dissent, Justice Louis Brandeis took issue with the majority's interpretation of income. He argued that the Sixteenth Amendment authorized Congress to tax "incomes, from whatever source derived" and that the authors of the amendment "intended to include thereby everything which by reasonable understanding can fairly be regarded as income." Also, "Congress possesses the power which it exercised to make dividends representing profits, taxable as income, whether the medium in which the dividend is paid be cash or stock, and that it may define, as it has done, what dividends representing profits shall be deemed income."

He noted that in business circles, cash dividends and stock dividends were treated identically. In effect, he argued that a stock dividend is really a cash dividend since it is really two-step affair, with a cash distribution that is then used to purchase additional shares by the exercise of stock subscription rights. Brandeis saw no reason for two essentially-identical transactions to be treated differently for tax purposes:

Justice Brandeis' effort to construct, or read in, a cash distribution was strained and unconvincing. The plain fact is that Mrs. Macomber did not receive, and could not have obtained, a cash payment from Standard Oil. Had she wished to substitute cash in an amount equivalent to the value of the stock dividend, she would have had to sell the dividend shares to other investors. No other cash source was made available.

— Marvin Chirelstein, Federal Income Taxation, A Law Student's Guide

== Aftermath ==
In any event, the success of investors in avoiding tax was short lived. The following year, the Court ruled that capital gains were income and that they should be recognized as income when the stock was sold. In addition, the exception for stock dividends was narrowed by the Court in such cases as United States v. Phellis, 257 U.S. 156 (1921) (shares in a subsidiary corporation that were issued to stockholders in the parent corporation were taxable as income); Rockefeller v. United States 257 U.S. 176 (1921) and Cullinan v. Walker 262 U.S. 134 (1923) (increases in capital accumulated by corporations over time were taxable when shares were distributed to stockholders in a successor corporation).

In 1940, the Supreme Court departed from the realization concept described in Eisner v. Macomber when it held in Helvering v. Bruun, 309 U.S. 461 (1940) that "severance" is not an element of realization. In Bruun, a taxpayer-landlord repossessed a property from a tenant—property that had been subject to a 99-year lease - after the tenant failed to pay rent and taxes. The lease had allowed for the tenant to construct a new building or other improvements. The tenant had removed the existing building and built a new one. The value of the new building, as of the date of repossession, was $64,245.68. The government contended that the landlord realized a gain of $51,434.25, the difference between the value of the building at the date of repossession and the landlord's basis in the old building of $12,811.43. The landlord argued that there was no realization of the property because no transaction had occurred, and that the improvement of the property that created the gain was unseverable from the landlord's original capital.

The Court ruled against the landlord and decided that the landlord had realized a gain upon repossession of the property. The Court also said that "severance" was no longer an element of realization.

== Use by tax protesters ==
Eisner v. Macomber is a key case in US income tax law. Its rather narrow but important application has been used by tax protesters who argue that wages from labor cannot be taxed as income. The Macomber decision was not about wages, but stock dividends.

Here is a typical quote from the case used as support of this position:

In order, therefore, that the clauses cited from Article I of the Constitution may have proper force and effect save only as modified by the Amendment, and that the latter also may have proper effect, it is essential to distinguish between what is and what is not income" as the term is there used; and to apply the distinction as cases arise according to truth and substance without regard to form. Congress by any definition it may adopt cannot conclude the matter, since it cannot by legislation alter the Constitution, from which it derives its power to legislate, and within whose limitations alone that power can be lawfully exercised [emphasis added]

The Supreme Court in the case discussed what was income, and quoted from Towne v. Eisner:

Just as we deem the legislative intent manifest to tax the stockholder with respect to such accumulations only if and when, and to the extent that, his interest in them comes to fruition as income, that is, in dividends declared, so we can perceive no constitutional obstacle that stands in the way of carrying out this intent when dividends are declared out of a pre-existing surplus.... Congress was at liberty under the amendment to tax as income, without apportionment, everything that became income, in the ordinary sense of the word, after the adoption of the amendment, including dividends received in the ordinary course by a stockholder from a corporation, even though they were extraordinary in amount and might appear upon analysis to be a mere realization in possession of an inchoate and contingent interest that the stockholder had in a surplus of corporate assets previously existing. [emphasis added]

Important principles in Eisner v. Macomber are that the word "income" in the Sixteenth Amendment is generally given its ordinary plain English meaning and that wealth and property that are not income may not be taxed as income by the Federal Government.

== See also ==
- Irwin v. Gavit
- List of United States Supreme Court cases, volume 252

== Sources ==
- Chatfield, Michael. "Eisner v. Macomber." In History of Accounting: An International Encyclopedia, edited by Michael Chatfield and Richard Vangermeersch. New York: Garland Publishing, 1996. P. 226.
- Kornhauser, Marjorie E. (2002). "The Story of Macomber: The Continuing Legacy of Realization". In Caron, Paul L. (ed.). Tax stories: An in-depth look at ten leading federal income tax cases. New York: Foundation Press. pp. 53–96. ISBN 978-1-58778-403-3.
- Magill, Roswell F. (1933). "When Is Income Realized?". Harvard Law Review. 46 (6): 933–953. doi:10.2307/1332063. JSTOR 1332063.
