= Cesarini v. United States =

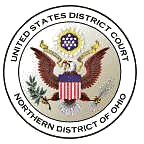
- Court: United States District Court for the Northern District of Ohio
- Decided: February 17, 1969
- Docket nos.: No. C 67-65
- Citation: 296 F. Supp. 3

Court membership
- Judge sitting: Don John Young

Keywords
- Realization

Cesarini v. United States, 296 F. Supp. 3 (N.D. Ohio 1969), is a historic case decided by the U.S. District Court for the Northern District of Ohio, where the court ruled that treasure trove property is included in gross income for the tax year when it was discovered. The case is frequently cited in American law school textbooks as an example of the nuances of income taxation.

== Facts ==
The plaintiffs, Ermenegildo and Maria Cesarini, were a husband and wife who purchased a used piano at an auction sale in 1957 for approximately $15.00. In 1964, while cleaning the piano, they discovered $4,467.00 in old currency in the piano. Plaintiffs exchanged the old currency for new at a bank and reported $4,467.00 on their 1964 joint U.S. federal income tax return as ordinary income from other sources. On October 18, 1965, the couple filed an amended return, eliminating $4,467.00 from the gross income computation and requesting a refund of $836.51. On January 18, 1966, the Internal Revenue Service (IRS) rejected their refund claim, and they later filed a lawsuit. The taxpayers asserted three arguments: (1) $4,467.00 is not includable in gross income under Internal Revenue Code section 61; (2) Even if the money was gross income, it was due and owing in the year the piano was purchased, 1957, and by 1964 the statute of limitations provided by 26 U.S.C. Sec. 6501 had elapsed; and (3) If the money is gross income in 1964, then plaintiffs are entitled to capital gains treatment under Section 1221 of the Internal Revenue Code.

== Issues ==
1. Whether the monies found in the piano are includable as gross income?
2. Whether taxes on the monies were due in the year the piano was purchased or in the year the monies were found?
3. Whether plaintiffs are entitled to capital gains treatment?

== Holding ==
The receipt of the monies constituted gross income in 1964, the year in which the funds were reduced to undisputed possession. Plaintiffs are not entitled to a refund, nor are they entitled to capital gains treatment.

== Reasoning ==
The monies in the piano are includable as gross income for three reasons. First, an IRS Revenue Ruling states, “the finder of treasure trove is in receipt of taxable income, for Federal income tax purposes, to the extent of its value in United States currency, for the taxable year in which it is reduced to undisputed possession.” Second, numerous Supreme Court cases recognize the broad sweeping construction of Section 61(a) found in Treas. Reg. Sec. 1.61-1(a). Third, other courts and commentators have taken the position that windfalls, including found monies, were properly includable in gross income under Section 22(a) of the 1939 Code, which is the predecessor of Section 61(a) in the 1954/1986 Code. Plaintiffs were unable to point to any inconsistencies between the gross income sections of the Code, the interpretation of them by the regulations and the courts, and the revenue rulings. Thus, the monies found in the piano constituted gross income.

The monies were properly included as gross income for the calendar year of 1964. Problems of when title vests, or when possession is complete, as it relates to federal taxation and in the absence of definitive federal legislation, is determined by state law. Ohio does not have a statute dealing with the rights of owners and finders of treasure trove, thus the English common-law rule applies. English common-law rule states that “title belongs to the finder as against all the world except the true owner.” Thus, Plaintiffs must have actually found the money to have superior title over all but the true owner. The $4,467.00 was not “reduced to undisputed possession” until actual discovery in 1964. Pursuant to Treas. Reg. Sec. 1.61-14, “treasure trove, to the extent of its value in United States currency, constitutes gross income for the taxable year in which it is reduced to undisputed possession.” Therefore the United States is not barred by the statute of limitations from collecting the $836.51 in tax in 1964.

Capital gains treatment is not applicable in this case. At the time relevant to this case, section 1222(3) of the Internal Revenue Code defined long-term capital gains as gains resulting from the sale or exchange of capital assets held for more than 6 months. Neither the piano nor the currency were sold or exchanged; thus, the plaintiffs were not entitled to capital gains treatment.

== Real world impact ==
Cesarini is important for further defining gross income under Section 61(a). It extends gross income to treasure troves and requires that taxpayers list the income in the year in which it is reduced to undisputed possession. Cesarini alerts taxpayers to the notion that many things may constitute gross income even though they are not explicitly identified in the Tax Code. Taxpayers should consult all sources, including Treasury Regulations, before making assumptions about what constitutes income.
