= Recognition (tax) =

In U.S. Federal income tax law, recognition is among a series of prerequisites to the manifestation of gains and losses used to determine tax liability. First, in the series for manifesting gain and loss, a taxpayer must "realize" gain and loss. This word "realize" is a term of art that refers to the realization requirement where the taxpayer must receive or lose something of monetary value. Once the realization requirement is met, gains and losses are taken into account only to the extent that they are also "recognized."

Internal Revenue Code section 1001(c) provides that gains and losses, if realized, are also recognized unless otherwise provided in the Code. This default rule has several exceptions, called "nonrecognition" rules, which are scattered throughout the Code. These exceptions often apply in situations in which a taxpayer shifts his investment from one piece of property to another piece of property. In such cases, where the taxpayer is merely continuing his investment, it makes sense to defer the recognition of any gain or loss realized until the taxpayer truly ends the investment.

Internal Revenue Code sections 1031 through 1045 provide the most commonly implicated nonrecognition rules, including the section 1031 rule for Like-Kind Exchanges.

== Impact ==
Recognition is mostly a matter of timing; the issue is not whether income or loss is taken into account, but when. The time of recognition may matter for a number of reasons, including the time value of money and the section 1211(b) limitation on capital losses in a single year.
