= Springer v. United States =

- Supreme Court of the United States

Argued April 8–9, 1880 Decided January 24, 1881
- Full case name: William M. Springer v. United States
- Citations: 102 U.S. 586 (more) 26 L. Ed. 253; 1880 U.S. LEXIS 2066

Holding
- The federal income tax imposed under the Revenue Act of 1864 was constitutional.

Court membership
- Chief Justice Morrison Waite Associate Justices Nathan Clifford · Samuel F. Miller; Stephen J. Field · Joseph P. Bradley; Ward Hunt · John M. Harlan; William B. Woods

Case opinion
- Majority: Swayne, joined by unanimous

Springer v. United States, 102 U.S. 586 (1881), was a case in which the United States Supreme Court upheld the federal income tax imposed under the Revenue Act of 1864.

== Background ==
William M. Springer had filed a federal income tax return for the tax year 1865 showing $50,798 in income and $4,799 in income tax, but he refused to pay the tax. His income was from two sources: income in his profession as an attorney at law and interest income on United States bonds.

After Springer's failure to pay the tax, the federal tax collector advertised Springer's properties for sale to satisfy the tax liability. In 1867 and 1874, the tax collector sold two pieces of real estate owned by Springer in Springfield, Illinois, one of which was Springer's residence, apparently without physically seizing the properties or ejecting Springer from the properties. The properties were deeded by the tax collector to the federal government. One of the deeds recited the statutory authority for the sale as being an Act of Congress of "July 1, 1862" as amended by an Act of "March 30, 1864."

In 1874, the government filed a lawsuit of ejectment against Springer with respect to the previously sold properties. In his ejectment action, Springer challenged the constitutionality of the 1864 Act.

== Issues raised ==
Springer's challenge was based on the contention that the income tax imposed by the statute was a direct tax that was not apportioned among the states according to the population of each state, as is required under Article I of the Constitution. To support his contention that the tax was direct, Springer cited the definitions of direct taxes by John Stuart Mill, Adam Smith, and others.

Springer made various other arguments, one of which was that although there was an Act of Congress bearing the date "July 1, 1862" although no such Act had been amended on "March 30, 1864," the amendment date cited in one of the deeds. Springer indicated that the statute in question may have been the Act dated June 30, 1864, as amended by an Act dated March 3, 1865, and argued that if it was the case, the 1864 Act did not authorize the sale of the real estate by the federal tax collector.

== Decision ==
In an opinion written by Justice Swayne, the Supreme Court agreed with Springer that the recital of the Act of Congress in the deed was incorrect and that the Act of Congress dated "July 1, 1862" had not been amended on March 30, 1864. The Court stated that the statute in question was actually the Act of June 30, 1864, as amended by the Act of March 3, 1865. The Court rejected Springer's argument that the Revenue Act of 1864 did not authorize the sale by the tax collector.

The Court then upheld the unapportioned income tax imposed under the 1864 Act and rejected Springer's argument that the income tax was a direct tax within the meaning of Article I of the Constitution.

== Rationale ==
The Court set forth a lengthy examination of the history leading to the inclusion of the apportionment requirement in the Constitution:

It appears that on the 11th of July, in that year, there was a debate of some warmth involving the topic of slavery. On the day following, Gouverneur Morris, of New York, submitted a proposition 'that taxation shall be in proportion to representation.' It is further recorded in this day's proceedings, that Mr. Morris having so varied his motion by inserting the word 'direct,' it passed nem. con., as follows: 'Provided always that direct taxes ought to be proportioned to representation.' 2 Madison Papers, by Gilpin, pp. 1079-1081. On the 24th of the same month, Mr. Morris said that 'he hoped the committee would strike out the whole clause.... He had only meant it as a bridge to assist us over a gulf; having passed the gulf, the bridge may be removed. He thought the principle laid down with so much strictness liable to strong objections.' Id. 1197. The gulf was the share of representation claimed by the Southern States on account of their slave population. But the bridge remained. The builder could not remove it, much as he desired to do so. All parties seem thereafter to have avoided the subject. With one or two immaterial exceptions, not necessary to be noted, it does not appear that it was again adverted to in any way. It was silently incorporated into the draft of the Constitution as that instrument was finally adopted.

After further examining the contemporaneous writings of James Madison and Alexander Hamilton, the Court quoted Hamilton as asserting that direct taxes should be held to be only "capitation or poll taxes, and taxes on lands and buildings, and general assessments, whether on the whole property of individuals or on their whole real or personal estate. All else must, of necessity, be considered as indirect taxes." Comparing Hamilton's understanding of the clause to the facts of the case, the Court stated:

The tax here in question falls within neither of these categories. It is not a tax on the "whole... personal estate" of the individual, but only on his income, gains, and profits during a year, which may have been but a small part of his personal estate, and in most cases would have been so. This classification lends no support to the argument of the plaintiff in error.

The Court concluded that "whenever the government has imposed a tax which it recognized as a direct tax, it has never been applied to any objects but real estate and slaves." It ultimately held "that direct taxes, within the meaning of the Constitution, are only capitation taxes, as expressed in that instrument, and taxes on real estate; and that the tax of which the plaintiff in error complains is within the category of an excise or duty."

== Aftermath ==
The holding in Springer was modified in part by the Court in the 1895 case of Pollock v. Farmers' Loan & Trust Co. on which the Court ruled that a tax on income from property in the form of interest, dividends, or rent should be treated as a tax on the property itself and therefore as a direct tax required to be apportioned. The Sixteenth Amendment overruled the Pollock decision and has made it clear that there is no requirement for apportionment of income taxes. In Bowers v. Kerbaugh-Empire Co., the Supreme Court reviewed Pollock, the Corporation Excise Tax Act of 1909, and the Sixteenth Amendment and concluded that Congress had always had the unfettered power to tax income, as set forth in Springer.
