= Revenue Act of 1864 =

The Internal Revenue Act of 1864, 13 Stat. 223 (June 30, 1864), increased the income tax rates established by the Revenue Act of 1862. The measure was signed into law by President Abraham Lincoln.

== Provisions ==
Section 116 of the Act imposed the tax on "the gains, profits, and income of every person residing in the United States, or of any citizen of the United States residing abroad, whether derived from any kind of property, rents, interest, dividends, or salaries, or from any profession, trade, employment, or vocation, carried on in the United States or elsewhere, or from any other source whatever [ . . . ]"

The measure created a third tax bracket and increased taxes overall from the rates set in 1862. Tax brackets under the Act were as follows:

- 0%: under $600 (under US$18,898 in 2024 dollars, or a little less than the $21,900 average of the standard deduction for single and married taxpayers in the year 2024)
- 5%: from $600 to $5,000 (from US$18,898 to US$157,483 in 2024 dollars)
- 7.5%: from $5,000 to $10,000 (from US$157,483 to US$314,967 in 2024 dollars)
- 10%: $10,000 and above (US$314,967 and above in 2024 dollars)

In addition to raising income tax rates, the act established stamp taxes on such items as matches and photographs.

This act was allowed to expire as the populace mainly viewed it as an emergency measure for war-time situations. The Act ultimately expired in 1873 in the face of increased deficit spending. Congress readdressed reform of the tax law in 1893, eventually passing the Wilson–Gorman Tariff Act of 1894.

== Interpretation ==
In Springer v. United States, 102 U.S. 586 (1881), the Supreme Court upheld the Federal income tax imposed under the Revenue Act of 1864. The opinion was authored by Associate Justice of the U.S. Supreme Court Noah Haynes Swayne.
