= List of United States Supreme Court cases, volume 257 =

Supreme Court of the United States
- Interactive map of Supreme Court of the United States
- 38°53′26″N 77°00′16″W
- Established: March 4, 1789; 236 years ago
- Location: Washington, D.C.
- Coordinates: 38°53′26″N 77°00′16″W
- Composition method: Presidential nomination with Senate confirmation
- Authorised by: Constitution of the United States, Art. III, § 1
- Judge term length: life tenure, subject to impeachment and removal
- Number of positions: 9 (by statute)
- Website: supremecourt.gov

This is a list of cases reported in volume 257 of United States Reports, decided by the Supreme Court of the United States in 1921 and 1922.

== Justices of the Supreme Court at the time of volume 257 U.S. ==
The Supreme Court is established by Article III, Section 1 of the Constitution of the United States, which says: "The judicial Power of the United States, shall be vested in one supreme Court . . .". The size of the Court is not specified; the Constitution leaves it to Congress to set the number of justices. Under the Judiciary Act of 1789 Congress originally fixed the number of justices at six (one chief justice and five associate justices). Since 1789 Congress has varied the size of the Court from six to seven, nine, ten, and back to nine justices (always including one chief justice).

When the cases in volume 257 were decided the Court comprised the following nine members:

Portrait	Justice	Office	Home State	Succeeded	Date confirmed by the Senate (Vote)	Tenure on Supreme Court
	William Howard Taft	Chief Justice	Connecticut	Edward Douglass White	June 30, 1921 (Acclamation)	July 11, 1921 – February 3, 1930 (Retired)
	Joseph McKenna	Associate Justice	California	Stephen Johnson Field	January 21, 1898 (Acclamation)	January 26, 1898 – January 5, 1925 (Retired)
	Oliver Wendell Holmes Jr.	Associate Justice	Massachusetts	Horace Gray	December 4, 1902 (Acclamation)	December 8, 1902 – January 12, 1932 (Retired)
	William R. Day	Associate Justice	Ohio	George Shiras Jr.	February 23, 1903 (Acclamation)	March 2, 1903 – November 13, 1922 (Retired)
	Willis Van Devanter	Associate Justice	Wyoming	Edward Douglass White (as Associate Justice)	December 15, 1910 (Acclamation)	January 3, 1911 – June 2, 1937 (Retired)
	Mahlon Pitney	Associate Justice	New Jersey	John Marshall Harlan	March 13, 1912 (50–26)	March 18, 1912 – December 31, 1922 (Resigned)
	James Clark McReynolds	Associate Justice	Tennessee	Horace Harmon Lurton	August 29, 1914 (44–6)	October 12, 1914 – January 31, 1941 (Retired)
	Louis Brandeis	Associate Justice	Massachusetts	Joseph Rucker Lamar	June 1, 1916 (47–22)	June 5, 1916 – February 13, 1939 (Retired)
	John Hessin Clarke	Associate Justice	Ohio	Charles Evans Hughes	July 24, 1916 (Acclamation)	October 9, 1916 – September 18, 1922 (Retired)

== Citation style ==
Under the Judiciary Act of 1789 the federal court structure at the time comprised District Courts, which had general trial jurisdiction; Circuit Courts, which had mixed trial and appellate (from the US District Courts) jurisdiction; and the United States Supreme Court, which had appellate jurisdiction over the federal District and Circuit courts—and for certain issues over state courts. The Supreme Court also had limited original jurisdiction (i.e., in which cases could be filed directly with the Supreme Court without first having been heard by a lower federal or state court). There were one or more federal District Courts and/or Circuit Courts in each state, territory, or other geographical region.

The Judiciary Act of 1891 created the United States Courts of Appeals and reassigned the jurisdiction of most routine appeals from the district and circuit courts to these appellate courts. The Act created nine new courts that were originally known as the "United States Circuit Courts of Appeals." The new courts had jurisdiction over most appeals of lower court decisions. The Supreme Court could review either legal issues that a court of appeals certified or decisions of court of appeals by writ of certiorari. On January 1, 1912, the effective date of the Judicial Code of 1911, the old Circuit Courts were abolished, with their remaining trial court jurisdiction transferred to the U.S. District Courts.

Bluebook citation style is used for case names, citations, and jurisdictions.

- "# Cir." = United States Court of Appeals
  - e.g., "3d Cir." = United States Court of Appeals for the Third Circuit
- "D." = United States District Court for the District of . . .
  - e.g.,"D. Mass." = United States District Court for the District of Massachusetts
- "E." = Eastern; "M." = Middle; "N." = Northern; "S." = Southern; "W." = Western
  - e.g.,"M.D. Ala." = United States District Court for the Middle District of Alabama
- "Ct. Cl." = United States Court of Claims
- The abbreviation of a state's name alone indicates the highest appellate court in that state's judiciary at the time.
  - e.g.,"Pa." = Supreme Court of Pennsylvania
  - e.g.,"Me." = Supreme Judicial Court of Maine

== List of cases in volume 257 U.S. ==
Case Name	Page and year	Opinion of the Court	Concurring opinion(s)	Dissenting opinion(s)	Lower Court	Disposition
Smietanka v. Indiana Steel Company	1 (1921)	Holmes	none	none	7th Cir.	certification
Ex parte Lincoln Gas and Electric Light Company	6 (1921)	Pitney	none	none	D. Neb.	rehearing denied
Yazoo and Mississippi Valley Railroad Company v. Clarksdale	10 (1921)	Taft	none	none	Miss.	reversed
Hildreth v. Mastoras	27 (1921)	Taft	none	none	9th Cir.	reversed
United States v. Sacks	37 (1921)	McKenna	none	none	S.D.N.Y.	reversed
United States v. Janowitz	42 (1921)	McKenna	none	none	S.D.N.Y.	reversed
Marine Railway and Coal Company v. United States	47 (1921)	Holmes	none	none	D.C. Cir.	affirmed
Springfield Gas and Electric Company v. City of Springfield	66 (1921)	Holmes	none	none	Ill.	affirmed
Nicholas v. United States	71 (1921)	Day	none	none	Ct. Cl.	affirmed
Norris v. United States	77 (1921)	Day	none	none	Ct. Cl.	affirmed
Eberlein v. United States	82 (1921)	Day	none	none	Ct. Cl.	affirmed
Pennsylvania Railroad Company v. Weber	85 (1921)	Day	none	none	3d Cir.	affirmed
Wilson v. Republic Iron and Steel Company	92 (1921)	VanDevanter	none	none	N.D. Ala.	affirmed
Citizens National Bank v. Durr	99 (1921)	Pitney	none	Holmes	Ohio	affirmed
Alabama and Vicksburg Railway Company v. Journey	111 (1921)	Brandeis	none	none	Miss.	reversed
Louisiana and Pine Bluff Railway Company v. United States	114 (1921)	Brandeis	none	none	W.D. Ark.	affirmed
Breiholz v. Pocahontas County	118 (1921)	Clarke	none	none	Iowa	affirmed
Hunt v. United States	125 (1921)	Clarke	none	none	Ct. Cl.	reversed
Crescent Cotton Oil Company v. Mississippi	129 (1921)	Clarke	none	none	Miss.	affirmed
J. Horstmann Company v. United States	138 (1921)	McKenna	none	none	Ct. Cl.	affirmed
Kern River Company v. United States	147 (1921)	VanDevanter	none	none	9th Cir.	affirmed
United States v. Phellis	156 (1921)	Pitney	none	McReynolds	Ct. Cl.	reversed
Rockefeller v. United States	176 (1921)	Pitney	none	none	S.D.N.Y.	affirmed
American Steel Foundries v. Tri-City Central Trades Council	184 (1921)	Taft	none	none	7th Cir.	multiple
Robert Mitchell Furniture Company v. Selden Breck Construction Company	213 (1921)	Holmes	none	none	S.D. Ohio	affirmed
North Pacific Steamship Company v. Soley	216 (1921)	Day	none	none	N.D. Cal.	affirmed
Hurley v. Virginia Commission of Fisheries	223 (1921)	McReynolds	none	none	E.D. Va.	affirmed
Rafferty v. Smith, Bell and Company, Ltd.	226 (1921)	McReynolds	none	none	Phil.	reversed
Western Fuel Company v. Garcia	233 (1921)	McReynolds	none	none	9th Cir.	reversed
Kahn v. United States	244 (1921)	Brandeis	none	none	Ct. Cl.	affirmed
Central Railroad Company of New Jersey v. United States	247 (1921)	Brandeis	none	none	D.N.J.	reversed
Curtis v. Connly	260 (1921)	Holmes	none	none	1st Cir.	affirmed
Eureka Pipe Line Company v. Hallanan	265 (1921)	Holmes	none	Clarke	W. Va.	reversed
United Fuel Gas Company v. Hallahan	277 (1921)	Holmes	none	none	W. Va.	reversed
Danke-Walker Milling Company v. Bondurant	282 (1921)	VanDevanter	none	Brandeis	Ky.	reversed
Miller v. American Bonding Company	304 (1921)	VanDevanter	none	none	3d Cir.	affirmed
Truax v. Corrigan	312 (1921)	Taft	none	Holmes; Pitney; Brandeis	Ariz.	reversed
American Column and Lumber Company v. United States	377 (1921)	Clarke	none	Holmes; Brandeis	W.D. Tenn.	affirmed
The Western Maid	419 (1921)	Holmes	none	McKenna	multiple	prohibition granted
Federal Trade Commission v. Beech-Nut Packing Company	441 (1921)	Day	none	Holmes; McReynolds	2d Cir.	reversed
Southern Pacific Railroad Company v. Fall	460 (1921)	VanDevanter	none	none	D.C. Cir.	affirmed
Cunningham v. Rodgers	466 (1921)	McReynolds	none	none	D.C. Cir.	affirmed
Grant Smith-Porter Ship Company v. Rohde	469 (1921)	McReynolds	none	none	9th Cir.	certification
Davis v. Wallace	478 (1921)	VanDevanter	none	none	D.N.D.	reversed
North Dakota ex rel. Lemke v. Chicago and Northwestern Railway Company	485 (1921)	Holmes	none	none	original	dismissed
Corneli v. Moore	491 (1921)	McKenna	none	McReynolds	W.D. Mo.	affirmed
Gillespie v. Oklahoma	501 (1921)	Holmes	none	none	Okla.	reversed
International Railroad Company v. Davidson	506 (1921)	Brandeis	none	none	2d Cir.	reversed
Georgia v. South Carolina	516 (1921)	Clarke	none	none	original	boundary set
United States v. Cook	523 (1921)	Taft	none	none	Ct. Cl.	affirmed
Terral v. Burke Construction Company	529 (1921)	Taft	none	none	E.D. Ark.	affirmed
Missouri Pacific Railroad Company v. Clarendon Boat Oar Company, Inc.	533 (1921)	Taft	none	none	La. Ct. App.	dismissed
United States v. M. Rice and Company	536 (1921)	Taft	none	none	Ct. Cust. App.	affirmed
Wallace v. United States	541 (1921)	Taft	none	none	Ct. Cl.	affirmed
Commissioners of Road Improvement District No. 2 of Lafayette County, Arkansas v. St. Louis Southwestern Railway Company	547 (1921)	Taft	none	none	8th Cir.	affirmed
Wisconsin Railroad Commission v. Chicago, Burlington and Quincy Railroad Company	563 (1921)	Taft	none	none	E.D. Wis.	affirmed
New York v. United States	591 (1921)	Taft	none	none	N.D.N.Y.	affirmed
Smietanka v. First Trust and Savings Bank	602 (1921)	Taft	none	none	7th Cir.	affirmed
