= Revenue Act of 1861 =

US legislation establishing the first national income tax

- Other short titles: Act of August 5, 1861
- Long title: An Act to provide increased Revenue from Imports, to pay Interest on the Public Debt, and for other Purposes.
- Enacted by: the 37th United States Congress
- Effective: August 5, 1861

Citations
- Public law: Chapter 45
- Statutes at Large: 12 Stat. 292

Codification
- Acts amended: Morrill Tariff (1861)

Legislative history
- Introduced in the House as H.R. 71 by R‑PA Thaddeus Stevensth on July 23, 1861; Committee consideration by House Committee on Ways and Means; Passed the House on July 29, 1861 (Voice vote); Passed the Senate on July 30, 1861 (Voice vote); Reported by the joint conference committee on August 1861; agreed to by the House on August 2, 1861 (106–28 (agreed to conference report)) and by the Senate on August 2, 1861 (34–8 (agreed to conference report)); Signed into law by President Abraham Lincoln on August 5, 1861

Major amendments
- Revenue Act of 1862

The Revenue Act of 1861, formally cited as Act of August 5, 1861, Chap. XLV, 12 Stat. 292, included the first U.S. Federal income tax statute (see Sec. 49). The Act, motivated by the need to fund the Civil War, imposed an income tax to be "levied, collected, and paid, upon the annual income of every person residing in the United States, whether such income is derived from any kind of property, or from any profession, trade, employment, or vocation carried on in the United States or elsewhere, or from any other source whatever". The tax imposed was a flat tax, with a rate of 3% on incomes above $800 ($28,667 in 2025). The Revenue Act of 1861 was signed into law by Abraham Lincoln.

The income tax provision (Sections 49, 50 and 51) was repealed by the Revenue Act of 1862. (See Sec.89, which replaced the flat rate with a progressive scale of 3% on annual incomes beyond $600 (which was 3.4 times the 1862 nominal gross domestic product per capita of $177.69; the corresponding income in 2021 is $234K) and 5% on incomes above $10,000 (which is 56 times the 1862 nominal gross domestic product per capita; corresponding to $3.9M of income in 2021) or those living outside the U.S., and perhaps more significantly it was explicitly temporary, specifying termination of income tax in "the year eighteen hundred and sixty-six").

== History ==
Prior to the Civil War, the United States faced a financial depression subsequent to the Panic of 1857, an event facilitated by over-expansion of the domestic economy and a European financial meltdown. In the three years preceding the Civil War, the Federal Government incurred a budget deficit exceeding $40 million. Coupled with the threat of secession, the Federal deficit placed the US government under considerable financial strain. In 1860, the US Treasury paid between 8 and 12 percent interest on government bonds in order to raise additional funds and meet public expenditures. In December 1861, the US Treasury attempted to sell five million dollars of interest-bearing notes at 12 percent but found itself able to dispose of only four million dollars' worth. The Treasury's struggles illustrate the precarious nature of the US government's financial state. As the nation edged closer to war, the need to mobilize a volunteer force placed an additional financial burden upon the Federal government. While treasury notes with enticing interest rates allowed the US government to raise revenue quickly, they also established a need for additional revenue streams with which to pay off interest.

In March 1861, President Lincoln began to explore the federal government's ability to wage war against the South from a logistical standpoint. He sent letters to cabinet members including Edward Bates, Salmon Chase, and Gideon Welles inquiring whether the president had constitutional authority to collect duties ranging from an import tariff to a property tax. Documents housed at the Library of Congress indicate that Lincoln was concerned with the Federal government's ability to collect tariffs from ports along the Southeastern seaboard, noting the imminent threat of secession.

On July 4, 1861, President Lincoln opened a special session of Congress with the explicit purpose of addressing the Civil War from a legislative standpoint. One of the primary concerns facing Congress was the question of funding: given a surfeit of volunteers, the Union Army military incurred extraordinary expenditures as they trained and armed a martial force. President Lincoln noted that, "One of the greatest perplexities of the government, is to avoid receiving troops faster than it can provide for them. In a word, the people will save their government, if the government itself, will do its part" To raise revenue by approximately $50 million, legislators adopted a three-pronged approach consisting of an increase in certain import tariffs, a newly instituted property tax, and the first personal income tax.

Under the leadership of Senator William Pitt Fessenden of Maine, chair of the Senate Finance Committee, Congress drafted the Revenue Act of 1861 in a relatively short time-frame. While the legislation effectively introduced import tariffs, property taxes, and a flat rate income tax of 3% on those making above $800, it lacked a comprehensive enforcement mechanism. In Congress, the bill provoked considerable debate: Thaddeus Stevens, chairman of the House Committee of Ways and Means, declared that, "This bill is a most unpleasant one. But we perceive no way in which we can avoid it and sustain the government. The rebels, who are now destroying or attempting to destroy this Government, have thrust upon the country many disagreeable things." His sentiment reflected the view that the income and property taxes levied by the bill were necessary evils. The bill was eventually passed by Congress and signed into law by President Lincoln. Despite its sweeping reform, the ineffective enforcement mechanism coupled with a 3% flat tax rate failed to yield the desired revenue.

== Tax structure ==
- Import Tariff: The Revenue Act of 1861 levied various tariffs on imports including sugar, tea, nuts, brimstone, coffee, liquor, and various fruits and herbs. The majority of imports were taxed on a per unit basis while certain imports, often those with more volatile pricing such as hides, citrus fruit, silk, and gunpowder were taxed ad valorem, with rates ranging from 10% on hides and rubber to 50% on wines. The act imposed an additional tax of 10% ad valorem on articles imported in foreign vessels from beyond the Cape of Good Hope. The provisions included in the act expanded upon the protectionist precedent set by the Morrill Tariff of 1861.
- Property Tax: The Revenue Act of 1861 instituted a tax on real estate, levied in proportion to each state's population. While the act's enforcement mechanism was limited, it formally established a system of tax districts, assessors, and collectors, laying the groundwork for the Internal Revenue Service's formation on July 1, 1862. The property tax drew criticism from representatives of rural states: by taxing real estate and excluding other forms of personal property, the tax, they argued placed an undue burden upon large, sparsely populated states and territories in the West and Southwest. Though densely populated states such as New York were assessed at a higher rate due to a large population, a greater proportion of wealth in such states was invested in personal property other than real estate.
- Income Tax: The Revenue Act of 1861 levied a 3% flat rate income tax on those with an annual income at or exceeding $800 (which was 5.6 times the 1861 nominal gross domestic product per capita of $144.31; the corresponding income in 2021 is $384K). In 1861, only 3% of the population had an annual income of at least $800; as such, the tax enjoyed relatively widespread support among legislators. The act granted President Lincoln the power to appoint one principal assessor and one principal collector per state/territory; these officials were charged with enforcing income tax provisions. However, another portion of the bill stipulated that each state may collect and pay its own portion of the direct tax levied upon each state in its own way. Lacking an effective enforcement mechanism, the income tax provision was repealed in 1862 and replaced with a more expansive bill in the Revenue Act of 1862. The subsequent revenue act called for the establishment of the Internal Revenue Bureau (later renamed Internal Revenue Service) and a progressive tax scale.
