= American Steel Foundries v. Tri-City Central Trades Council =

- Supreme Court of the United States

Argued January 17, 1919 Reargued October 5, 1920 Reargued October 4–5, 1921 Decided December 5, 1921
- Full case name: American Steel Foundries v. Tri-City Trades Council, et al.
- Citations: 257 U.S. 184 (more)

Holding
- Labor pickets are inherently intimidation. Only one person should be allowed at each entrance and exit of a business being struck.

Court membership
- Chief Justice William H. Taft Associate Justices Joseph McKenna · Oliver W. Holmes Jr. William R. Day · Willis Van Devanter; Mahlon Pitney · James C. McReynolds; Louis Brandeis · John H. Clarke

Case opinions
- Majority: Taft, joined by Day, Holmes, McKenna, McReynolds, Pitney, Van Devanter
- Concurrence: Brandeis
- Dissent: Clarke
- Superseded by
- Thornhill v. Alabama

American Steel Foundries v. Tri-City Central Trades Council, 257 U.S. 184 (1921), was a United States Supreme Court case in which the court held that picketing by more the one person at an entrance or exit to a struck business was not protected by the Clayton Antitrust Act of 1914. The court said that it was inherently a form of intimidation no matter how orderly the picket was.

This case was later superseded by cases like Thornhill v. Alabama (1940), which held that picketing was protected under free speech and the First Amendment.

== See also ==
- US labor law
- National Labor Relations Act of 1935
- List of United States Supreme Court cases, volume 257
