= Early v. Commissioner =

- Court: United States Court of Appeals for the Fifth Circuit
- Full case name: Allen M. Early and Jeannette B. Early v. Commissioner of Internal Revenue
- Decided: May 21, 1971
- Citation: 445 F.2d 166

Case history
- Subsequent history: Rehearing denied June 16, 1971; certiorari denied, 92 S.Ct. 100, October 12, 1971.

Court membership
- Judges sitting: James P. Coleman, Robert A. Ainsworth Jr., John Cooper Godbold

Case opinions
- Majority: Godbold, joined by a unanimous court

Laws applied
- Internal Revenue Code, 26 U.S.C. § 273

Early v. Commissioner, 445 F.2d 166 (5th Cir. 1971) was a United States income tax case, holding that an agreement between taxpayers and heirs of decedent—pursuant to which taxpayers received a joint life interest in income from the trust estate in return for the surrender of stock allegedly given to them by the decedent—was actually a compromise of the taxpayers' disputed right to the stock, and since they claimed the stock as donees, they were to be treated as having acquired their life estate in that capacity for federal income tax purposes.

== Background ==
=== Facts ===
Appellee taxpayers acquired interest in stock from decedent as a gift. Due to a will contest, appellees agreed to return the stock to the estate in exchange for a life estate in a portion of the income.

=== Tax returns ===
Appellees sought to amortize the value of the life estate in subsequent tax returns, which appellant Commissioner of Internal Revenue disallowed. The Commissioner disallowed the deductions for amortization on the ground that taxpayers' life interest was "acquired by gift, bequest, or inheritance" and that the deductions were therefore prohibited by § 273 of the Code.

=== Tax court ===
Taxpayers filed a petition for redetermination in the Tax Court, asserting that § 273 was inapplicable. They also contended that notwithstanding the tax-exempt source of some of the income the amortization was fully deductible, and accordingly claimed refunds for the years in which they had not taken deductions for amortization allocated to tax-exempt income.

The Tax Court held for taxpayers on both issues, it reversed and allowed the amortization, finding that 26 U.S.C. § 273 did not govern because the life estate was not a gift, but an exchange for consideration.

Tax Court which, over the dissents of six of its 15 members, overruled his determination of deficiencies in taxpayers' federal income tax for the years 1964–65, and in addition sustained taxpayers' claims for refunds for the same years.

The Tax Court held, and taxpayers contend, that Lyeth is inapplicable because taxpayers "sold or exchanged" the stock, to which they had bona fide claims of title through an alleged prior gift, for their life interest. To characterize the transaction with a different label, it is their contention that they "purchased" their joint life interest, and that § 273 does not apply to "purchased" life estates.

=== Issue ===
Appellant Commissioner of Internal Revenue sought review of a decision of the Tax Court which reversed appellant's finding that appellee taxpayers were entitled to periodic amortization of the value of a life estate acquired from a decedent.

At issue is whether, and to what extent, taxpayers are entitled to periodic deductions for amortization of the value of a joint life estate which they acquired from the estate of a decedent.

== Opinion of the court ==
On review, the court disagreed and reversed the tax court's decision, holding that because the original stock exchange from decedent was a gift, the subsequent settlement for the life estate was a gift, as well.

The court reversed the decision of the tax court, finding that because the life estate was acquired as a gift or bequest, that appellee taxpayers could not amortize the value of a life estate.
