= Noah Haynes Swayne =

US Supreme Court justice (1804–1884)

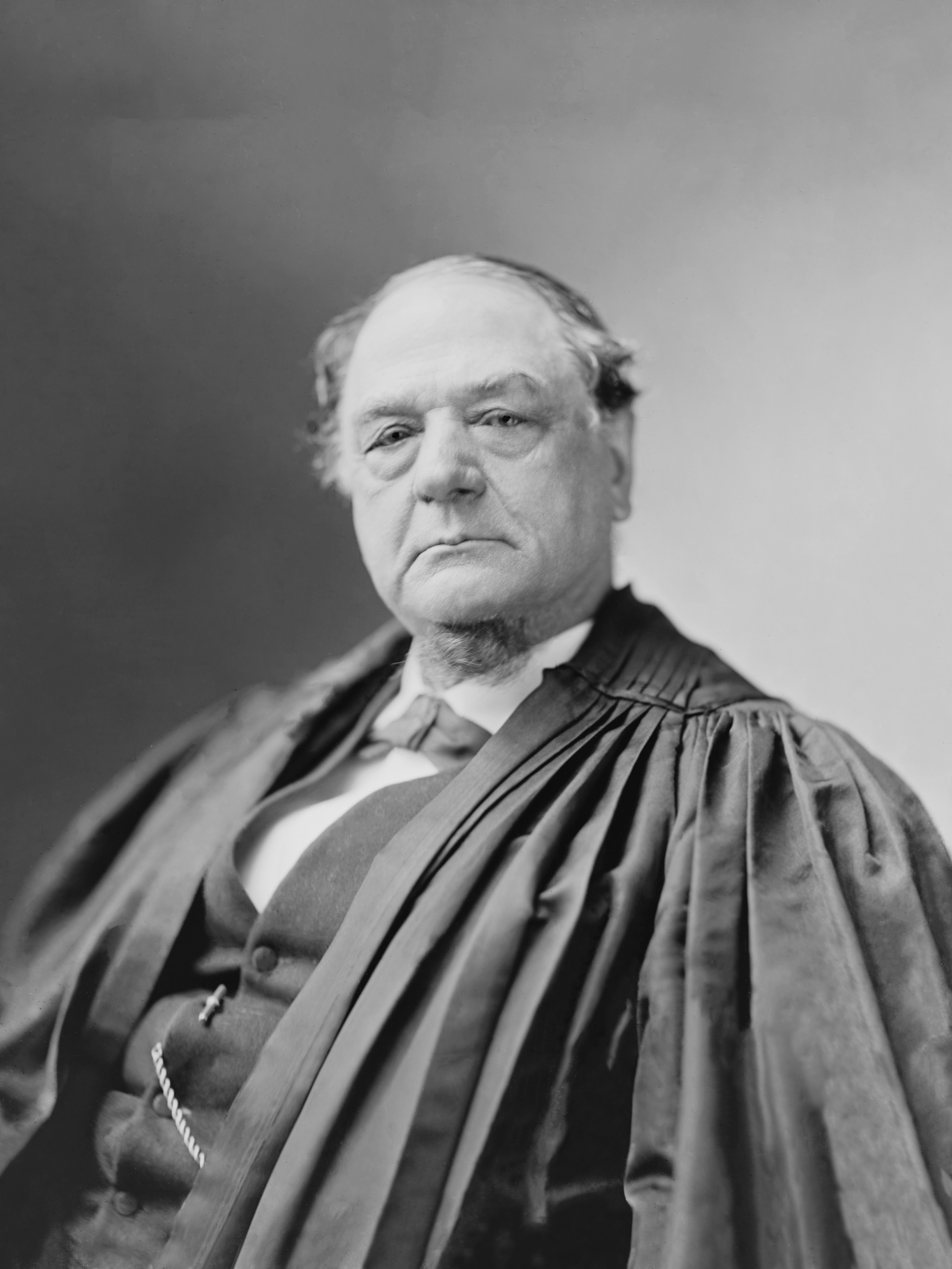
- Swayne, 1865–1880

Associate Justice of the Supreme Court of the United States
- In office January 27, 1862 – January 24, 1881
- Nominated by: Abraham Lincoln
- Preceded by: John McLean
- Succeeded by: Stanley Matthews

Personal details
- Born: December 7, 1804 Frederick County, Virginia, U.S.
- Died: June 8, 1884 (aged 79) New York City, U.S.
- Party: Democratic (Before 1856); Republican (1856–1884)
- Spouse: Sarah Swayne

Noah Haynes Swayne (December 7, 1804 – June 8, 1884) was an American jurist and politician. He was the first Republican appointed as a justice to the United States Supreme Court.

== Early life ==
Swayne was born in Frederick County, Virginia in the uppermost reaches of the Shenandoah Valley, approximately 100 miles (160 km) northwest of Washington D.C. He was the youngest of nine children of Joshua Swayne and Rebecca (Smith) Swayne. He was a descendant of Francis Swayne, who emigrated from England in 1710 and settled near Philadelphia. After his father died in 1809, Noah was educated locally until enrolling in Jacob Mendendhall's Academy in Waterford, Virginia, a respected Quaker school 1817–18. He began to study medicine in Alexandria, Virginia, but abandoned this pursuit after his teacher Dr. George Thornton died in 1819. Despite his family having no money to support his continued education, he read law under John Scott and Francis Brooks in Warrenton, Virginia, and was admitted to the Virginia Bar in 1823. A devout Quaker (and to date the only Quaker to serve on the Supreme Court), Swayne was deeply opposed to slavery, and in 1824 his abolitionist sentiments caused him to leave Virginia for the free state of Ohio.

He began a private practice in Coshocton and, in 1825, was elected Coshocton County Attorney. Four years later he was elected to the Ohio state legislature. In 1830 he was appointed U.S. Attorney for Ohio by Andrew Jackson, and moved to Columbus to take up the new position.

While serving as U.S. Attorney, Swayne was elected in 1834 to the Columbus City Council, and in 1836 to the Ohio House of Representatives. As U.S. Attorney, Swayne became close friends with Supreme Court justice John McLean. McLean, by the end of his career, was a strong Republican, and when the party was formed in 1855 Swayne had become an early member and political organizer.

In 1835, as escalating tensions in the boundary dispute between Ohio and Michigan Territory (the Toledo War) threatened to erupt into violent conflict, Ohio Governor Robert Lucas dispatched Swayne, along with former Congressman William Allen and David T. Disney, to Washington D.C. to confer with President Andrew Jackson. The delegation presented Ohio's case and urged the President to act swiftly to address the situation.

== Supreme Court service ==
John McLean was one of two dissenters in the Dred Scott case. He sought the Republican nomination for President in 1860, losing to Abraham Lincoln. However, he recommended to Lincoln on a number of occasions that Swayne be nominated to replace him on the court. This proved timely; McLean died in April 1861, shortly after Lincoln's inauguration. As the American Civil War began, Swayne campaigned for the vacant seat, lobbying several Ohio members of Congress for their support. As the Oyez Project notes: "Swayne satisfied Lincoln's criteria for appointment: commitment to the Union, slavery opponent, geographically correct."

It is also believed that Swayne had represented fugitive slaves in court. So nine months after McLean's death, Swayne was nominated, on January 21, 1862. The nomination was confirmed by the United States Senate on January 24, 1862, with Swayne receiving his commission the same day. Three days later, on January 27, he took the judicial oath, thereby becoming the 35th justice of the Supreme Court.

In United States v. Rhodes, 1 Abb. U.S. 28 (C.C.D.Ky. 1867), Justice Swayne, riding on circuit, upheld the constitutionality of the Civil Rights Act of 1866 under the authority of the Thirteenth Amendment. He wrote,

The race had strong claims upon the justice and generosity of the nation. Weighty considerations of policy, humanity, and right were superadded. Slavery, in fact, still subsisted in thirteen states. Its simple abolition, leaving these laws and this exclusive power of the states over the emancipated in force, would have been a phantom of delusion. The hostility of the dominant class would have been animated with new ardor. Legislative oppression would have been increased in severity. Under the guise of police and other regulations slavery would have been in effect restored, perhaps in a worse form, and the gift of freedom would have been a curse instead of a blessing to those intended to be benefited. They would have had no longer the protection which the instinct of property leads its possessor to give in whatever form the property may exist. It was to guard against such evils that the second section of the amendment was framed. It was intended to give expressly to congress the requisite authority, and to leave no room for doubt or cavil upon the subject. The results have shown the wisdom of this forecast. Almost simultaneously with the adoption of the amendment this course of legislative oppression was begun. Hence, doubtless, the passage of the act under consideration. In the presence of these facts, who will say it is not an "appropriate" means of carrying out the object of the first section of the amendment, and a necessary and proper execution of the power conferred by the second? Blot out this act and deny the constitutional power to pass it, and the worst effects of slavery might speedily follow. It would be a virtual abrogation of the amendment.

In the Slaughterhouse Cases, 83 U.S. 36 (1873) – a pivotal decision on the meaning of Section 1 of the relatively new Fourteenth Amendment to the Constitution—Swayne dissented with justices Salmon P. Chase, Stephen Johnson Field, and Joseph Bradley. Field's dissent was important, and presaged later decisions broadening the scope of the Fourteenth Amendment. However, four years later Swayne joined the majority in Munn v. Illinois, with Field still dissenting.

Swayne's potential judicial greatness failed to materialize. He was the first of President Lincoln's five appointments to the Supreme Court; the other four were: Samuel Freeman Miller and David Davis, both in 1862; Stephen Johnson Field, in 1863; and Salmon P. Chase, as chief justice, in 1864. He is also said to have been "the weakest" of the five. His main distinction was his staunch judicial support of the president's war measures: the Union blockade (Prize Cases, 67 U.S. 635 (1862)); issuance of paper money (i.e., greenbacks in the Legal Tender Cases); and support for the presidential prerogative to declare martial law (Ex Parte Milligan, 71 U.S. 2 (1866)).

He is most famous for his majority opinion in Springer v. United States, 102 U.S. 586 (1881), which upheld the Federal income tax imposed under the Revenue Act of 1864.

In Gelpcke v. City of Dubuque, 68 U.S. 175 (1864), Swayne wrote the majority opinion, repudiating a claim that the Iowa constitution could impair legal obligations to bondholders. When contracts are made on the basis of trust in past judicial decisions those contracts could not be impaired by any subsequent construction of the law. "We shall never immolate truth, justice, and the law, because a state tribunal has erected the altar and decreed the sacrifice." According to Lurie, he strongly supported "the contractual rights of railroad bond holders, even in the face of repudiation sanctioned both by the Iowa state legislature and state supreme court. Obligations sacred to law are not to be destroyed simply because 'a state tribunal has erected the altar and decreed the sacrifice.'" For a later decision on impairment of contracts, compare Lochner v. New York, 198 U.S. 45 (1905).

Swayne remained on the court until 1881, twice lobbying unsuccessfully to be elevated to the position of chief justice (after the death of Roger B. Taney in 1864 and Salmon Chase in 1873).

After his retirement, Swayne returned to Ohio.

== Retirement, death and legacy ==
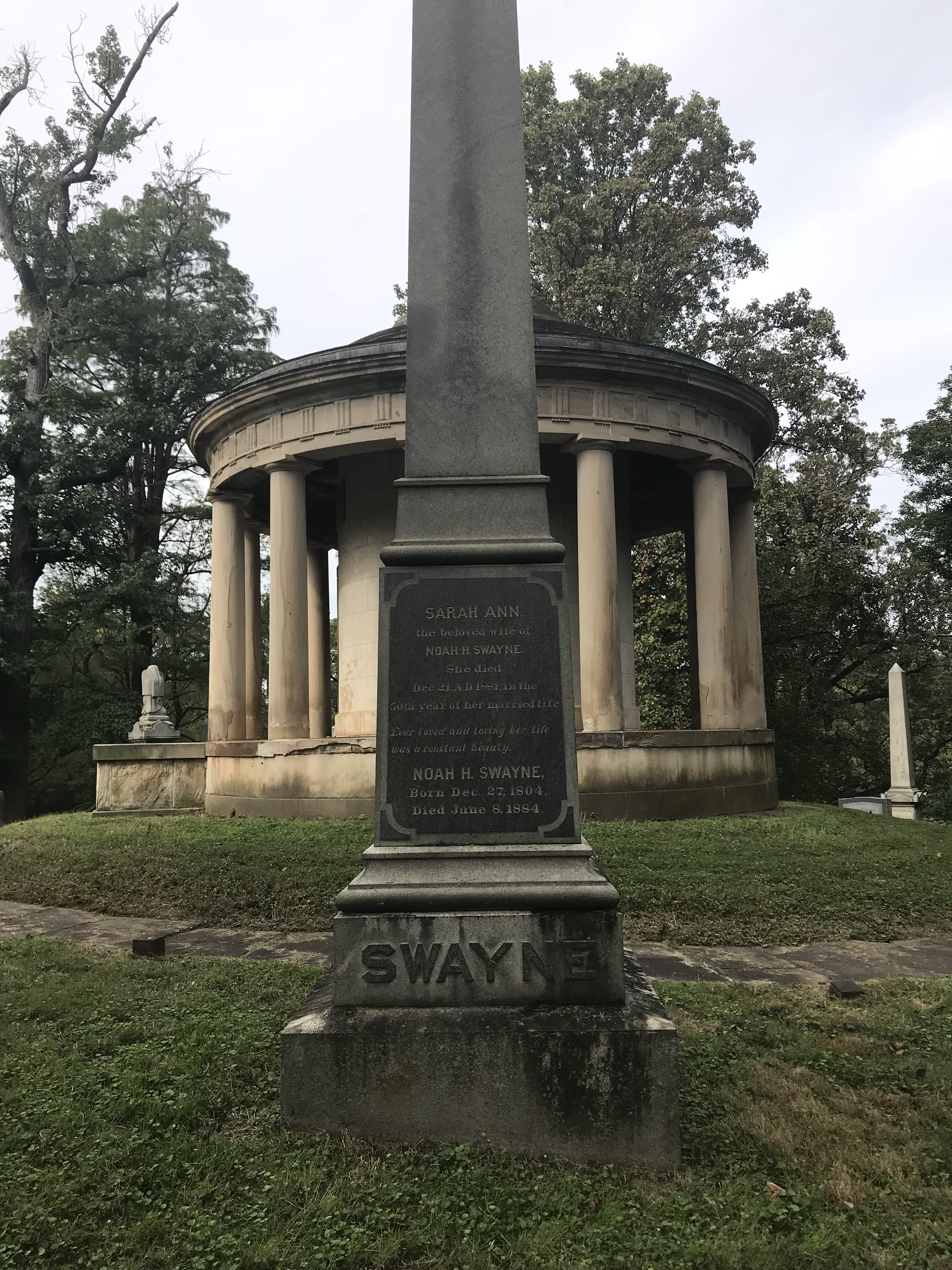
Swayne's gravesite

Swayne is not regarded as a particularly distinguished justice. He wrote few opinions, usually signing on to opinions written by others, and remained on the court well past his physical prime, being quite infirm at his retirement. Under pressure from President Rutherford B. Hayes, he finally agreed to retire on the condition that his friend and fellow Ohio attorney Stanley Matthews replace him.

His son, Wager Swayne, served in the American Civil War, rose to the rank of Major General, served as the military governor of Alabama after the Civil War, and subsequently founded law firms in Toledo, Ohio and New York City. Wager's son, named Noah Hayes Swayne after his grandfather, was president of Burns Brothers, the largest coal distributor in the U.S. when he retired in September 1932. Another of Wager's sons, Alfred Harris Swayne, was vice president of General Motors Corporation.

Another of Justice Swayne's sons, Noah Swayne, was a lawyer in Toledo and donated the land for Swayne Field, the former field for the Toledo Mud Hens baseball team.

After his death in 1884, Justice Swayne is buried at the Oak Hill Cemetery in Washington, D.C. Chief Justice Edward Douglass White and justice-designate Edwin M. Stanton (President Ulysses S. Grant's nomination of Stanton was confirmed by the Senate, but Stanton died before he could be sworn in) are also buried there.

A collection of Swayne's legal papers, pre-dating his service as a Justice, is housed at the Ohio Historical Society, and correspondence with him is also located at other repositories.

== See also ==
- List of federal judges appointed by Abraham Lincoln
- Nomination and confirmation to the Supreme Court of the United States
- List of justices of the Supreme Court of the United States
- Chase Court
- Taney Court
- Waite Court

Legal offices
Preceded by John McLean	Associate Justice of the Supreme Court of the United States; 1862–1881	Succeeded by Stanley Matthews
