= Revenue Act of 1862 =

1862 United States tax reform law

The Revenue Act of 1862 (July 1, 1862, Ch. 119, 12 Stat. 432), was a bill the United States Congress passed to help fund the American Civil War. President Abraham Lincoln signed the act into law on July 1, 1862. The act established the office of the Commissioner of Internal Revenue, a department in charge of the collection of taxes, and levied excise taxes on most items consumed and traded in the United States. The act also introduced the United States' first progressive tax with the intent of raising millions of dollars for the Union.

== Background ==
The American Civil War commenced in 1861 with the secession of many southern states (the group known as the Confederate States of America) from the United States (also known as the Union). In the early stages of the war, the Union believed that the conflict would be a relatively quick and easy victory. The federal government was in need of funding because of economic issues in the years leading up to the war, and as result, Congress' first attempt to fund the war came with the Act of July 17, 1861. It authorized the Secretary of the Treasury Salmon P. Chase to raise money by issuing $50,000,000 in Treasury Notes. Deteriorating economic conditions of the years before the war made the production of those notes cease, and they were officially declared unredeemable.

As economic conditions worsened in the North, Chase needed to raise more revenue. He was initially opposed to the notion of internal taxes, and believed that the better way to raise revenue was through the selling of war bonds. Citing the success of war bonds in raising revenue during the War of 1812, Chase consulted Philadelphia banker Jay Cooke to administer the sale of war bonds to citizens in the Union. Cooke employed a sophisticated propaganda campaign to market bonds to the middle classes as well as to the upper classes. He was able to persuade almost one million northerners to invest, resulting in bond sales of over $3 billion. The majority of these sales occurred during the later stages of the war, and the Union needed an immediate method of raising funds.

Congress passed the Revenue Act of 1861 as an initial attempt to raise much-needed funds for the war. This act levied the first income tax ever levied on American citizens. The income tax placed a 3% tax on all individuals whose annual incomes were above $800 per year. That would have resulted in the exemption of many citizens due to lower average income. By 1862 the United States government realized that the war would not end quickly and the revenue from the income tax would be insufficient. As a result, the Revenue Act of 1862 was passed in July 1862 before any income tax was collected under the first system.

== Summary ==
The Revenue Act of 1862 contained three important provisions, all aimed at the goal of increased revenue:

1. The creation of the office of the Commissioner of Internal Revenue, a department whose duty was to ensure the collection of taxes,
2. the levying of excise taxes on many everyday goods and services, and
3. an adjustment to the income tax that was created under the Revenue Act of 1861.

The Revenue Act of 1862, section 92, states that "duties on incomes herein imposed shall be due and payable" in 1863 and each year thereafter until and including 1866 "and no longer."

=== Office of the Commissioner of Internal Revenue ===
The first section of the act established "an office… in the Treasury Department to be called the Office of the Commissioner of Internal Revenue." This commissioner, selected by the President of the United States, was in charge of preparing and distributing all the instructions, regulations, directions, forms, and licenses "pertaining to the assessment and collection of the duties, stamp duties, licenses, and taxes, which may be necessary to carry this act into effect." This office was the predecessor for today's Internal Revenue Service (IRS).

=== Excise taxes ===
The Revenue Act of 1862 placed taxes on the majority of items available for retail and consumption. Among the items taxed were many luxury and sin items including, but not limited to liquor, tobacco, playing cards, gunpowder, feathers, telegrams, iron, leather, pianos, yachts, carriages, billiard tables, and jewelry. More importantly, the federal government placed taxes on many services and public goods as well. Other taxed items included patented medicines, newspaper advertisements, stamp taxes, inheritance taxes, taxes on licenses for all services and professions (with the exception of clergy), and value added taxes on manufactured goods and processed meats. One particular new tax required that corporations, banks, trust companies, savings institutions, and insurance companies report their finances, including receipts and interest earned, so that these could be taxed as well. The majority of these taxes and tariffs were consumer-oriented, and affected lower-income Americans more severely than the higher-income Americans. To reinforce the fairness of the system, Congress implemented a supplementary system of taxation via a new income tax.

=== Progressive income tax ===
The new tax proposed by Congress in the Revenue Act of 1862 was the first progressive income tax placed on United States residents. This tax reflected the taxpayers' "ability to pay" by separating citizens into multiple categories and taxing accordingly:

1. For U.S. residents whose annual incomes were less than $600, no tax was collected.
2. For U.S. residents whose annual incomes were greater than $600 and less than $10,000, a percentage of 3% of total income was demanded in tax.
3. For U.S. residents whose annual incomes were greater than $10,000, a percentage of 5% of total income was demanded in tax. The 5% tax rate also applied to the entire U.S.-source income over $600 of U.S. citizens who resided abroad, regardless of their income, unless they worked for the United States government.

The act also stated that to assure timely collection, income tax be "withheld at the source."

== Aftermath ==
In the long term, the Revenue Act of 1862 was only partially successful. The Office of the Commissioner of Internal Revenue became the IRS, which is still a functional department of the Treasury. The excise taxes remained in force, though the majority of the revenue was eventually generated through the taxes on liquor and tobacco. The progressive nature of the income tax remains, but the rates established in 1862 did not produce enough revenue to support war expenditures and were increased with the Revenue Act of 1864.

== Incomes adjusted for inflation - Bureau of Labor Statistics (BLS) ==
Adjusted for inflation based on Consumer Price Index (CPI) data:

1862 dollars	2025 dollars
$600	$19,350
$10,000	$322,500
