= United States v. Phellis =

- Supreme Court of the United States

Argued October 11, 1921 Decided November 21, 1921
- Full case name: United States v. C. W. Phellis
- Citations: 257 U.S. 156 (more) 42 S.Ct. 63; 66 L. Ed. 180; 1921 U.S. LEXIS 1328

Holding
- Shares in a subsidiary corporation issued to stockholders in the parent corporation are taxable as income.

Court membership
- Chief Justice William H. Taft Associate Justices Joseph McKenna · Oliver W. Holmes Jr. William R. Day · Willis Van Devanter; Mahlon Pitney · James C. McReynolds; Louis Brandeis · John H. Clarke

Case opinions
- Majority: Pitney, joined by Taft, McKenna, Holmes, Day, Brandeis, Clarke
- Dissent: McReynolds, joined by Van Devanter

United States v. Phellis, 257 U.S. 156 (1921), was a decision by the United States Supreme Court, which held that shares in a subsidiary corporation issued to stockholders in the parent corporation were taxable as income.
