= Helvering v. Bruun =

- Supreme Court of the United States

Argued February 28, 1940 Decided March 25, 1940
- Full case name: Helvering, Commissioner of Internal Revenue v. Bruun
- Citations: 309 U.S. 461 (more) 60 S. Ct. 631; 84 L. Ed. 864; 1940 U.S. LEXIS 1245

Case history
- Prior: 105 F.2d 442 (8th Cir. 1939); cert. granted, 308 U.S. 544 (1939).
- Subsequent: On remand, 112 F.2d 573 (8th Cir. 1940).

Holding
- A taxpayer realized a gain after repossessing property improved by a tenant.

Court membership
- Chief Justice Charles E. Hughes Associate Justices James C. McReynolds · Harlan F. Stone; Owen Roberts · Hugo Black; Stanley F. Reed · Felix Frankfurter; William O. Douglas · Frank Murphy

Case opinion
- Majority: Roberts, joined by unanimous court
- McReynolds took no part in the consideration or decision of the case.
- Superseded by
- §§ 109 and 1019 of the Internal Revenue Code

Helvering v. Bruun, 309 U.S. 461 (1940), was an income tax case before the Supreme Court of the United States. It is notable (and thus appears frequently in law school casebooks) for holding that under section 22(a) of the Revenue Act of 1932, income need not be in the form of cash for it to be taxable. Gain may occur as a result of exchange of property, payment of the taxpayer's indebtedness, relief from a liability, or other profit realized from the completion of a transaction.

== Facts ==
A landlord repossessed land from a tenant who had defaulted in the eighteenth year of a 99-year lease. During the course of the lease, the tenant had torn down an old building (in which the landlord's adjusted basis was now $12,811.43) and had built a new one (whose value was now $64,245.68). The lease had specified that the landlord was not required to compensate the tenant for these improvements.

The government argued that upon repossession, the landlord realized a gain of $51,434.25. The landlord argued that there was no realization of the property because no transaction had occurred, and because the improvement of the property that created the gain was not "severable" from the landlord's original capital.

== Holding ==
The court held for the government: under the Revenue Act of 1932, the value of the improvements was realized by the taxpayer as income in the year in which the forfeiture occurred.

The improvements, the Court observed, were received by the taxpayer "as a result of a business transaction," namely, the leasing of the taxpayer's land. It was not necessary to the recognition of gain that the improvements be severable from the land. All that had to be shown was that the taxpayer had acquired valuable assets from his lease in exchange for the use of his property. The medium of exchange—whether cash or in kind, and whether separately disposable or "affixed"—was immaterial as far as the realization criterion was concerned. In effect, the improvements represented rent, or rather a payment in lieu of rent, which was taxable to the landlord regardless of the form in which it was received.

"Severance" is not necessary for realization:

It is not necessary to recognition of taxable gain that he should be able to sever the improvement begetting the gain from his original capital. If that were necessary, no income could arise from the exchange of property, whereas such gain has always been recognized as realized taxable gain.

The Court added that, while not all economic gain is "realized" for taxation purposes, realization does not require that the economic gain be in "cash derived from the sale of an asset". Realization can also arise from property exchange; relief of indebtedness; or other transactions yielding profit—e.g. by receiving an asset with enhanced value in a transaction, even where severance does not occur (i.e. even where "the gain is a portion of the value of property received by the taxpayer in the transaction").

== Subsequent legislation ==
Congress nullified the effect of section 22 of the Revenue Act of 1932 (as interpreted by the Court in Bruun) by enacting the Revenue Act of 1942, section 115 of which included an amendment of section 22 of the Internal Revenue Code of 1939. The effect of that amendment to the 1939 Code was carried forward in sections 109 and 1019 of the Internal Revenue Code of 1954 (now the Internal Revenue Code of 1986). Section 109 excludes, from a lessor's income, the value of leasehold improvements realized on termination of a lease. Section 1019 denies the lessor a step-up in basis for the income so excluded. These provisions overrule the proposition announced in Bruun, that repossession of an asset with an enhanced value from a transaction with another party results in recognition of gross income.

The aim of the Revenue Act of 1942 was to relieve lessors—suddenly confronted with large tax obligations—of the need to raise cash in a hurry, at a time when the real estate market was scraping bottom. An inadvertent side effect of the means chosen—permitting current income to be deferred to later period—was to reduce the lessor's tax obligation absolutely, by postponing his realization of any improvements to the sale of the property.

== Academic commentary ==
Does the building of leasehold improvements represent an "accession" to wealth? If it does, is it "clearly realized"? And if it is, when does that realization occur? Four possible answers can be given.

1. Prepaid Rent: Include, as rent at the beginning of the lease, the present value (say $50,000) of the value the improvement is anticipated to have at the end of the lease (say $200,000). When the landlord terminates the lease and repossesses the property, this present value ($50,000) would also be the taxpayer's basis for the improvement.
2. Prorated Rent: Again, treat the anticipated value of the improvement ($200,000) as rent -- however, rather than include its present discounted value ($50,000) in Year 1, spread its realization annually over the term of the lease (say, $10,000 a year for 20 years). When the landlord terminates the lease and repossesses the property, this anticipated [final] value of the improvement ($200,000) would also be the taxpayer's basis for the improvement.
3. Postpaid Rent: Again, treat the anticipated value of the improvement ($200,000) as rent -- however, postpone realization until the termination of the lease. Again, when the landlord terminates the lease and repossesses the property, this anticipated [final] value of the improvement ($200,000) would also be the taxpayer's basis for the improvement.

- This was the alternative ultimately approved in Bruun. It has the advantage (over alternatives #1 & #2) of not requiring a prediction of the improvement's future value.

4. No rent at all: Treat the improvement as unrealized property appreciation. Do not tax its value as "rent" at any time. With nothing to include as income, the lessor's basis for the improvement on termination of the lease would be zero.

- This was the alternative argued unsuccessfully by the taxpayer in Bruun.
- It was also the position held by the pre-Bruun cases. These cases argued that such gain must be treated as unrealized until the entire property was sold for cash. This was because the improvement was physically "merged" with the land -- it could not be severed and disposed of separately from the land, was not "portable and detachable" unless torn down and scrapped.
- This is also the current law, under §§109 and 1019, which nullified Bruun.

== See also ==
- List of United States Supreme Court cases, volume 309
- Cottage Savings Ass'n v. Commissioner
