= Towne v. Eisner =

- Supreme Court of the United States

Argued December 12, 1917 Decided January 7, 1918
- Full case name: Towne v. Eisner, Collector of United States Internal Revenue for the Third District of the State of New York
- Citations: 245 U.S. 418 (more) 38 S. Ct. 158; 62 L. Ed. 372; 1918 U.S. LEXIS 2143; 1 U.S. Tax Cas. (CCH) ¶ 14; 3 A.F.T.R. (P-H) 2959

Holding
- A stock dividend based on accumulated profits is not "income."

Court membership
- Chief Justice Edward D. White Associate Justices Joseph McKenna · Oliver W. Holmes Jr. William R. Day · Willis Van Devanter; Mahlon Pitney · James C. McReynolds; Louis Brandeis · John H. Clarke

Case opinions
- Majority: Holmes, joined by White, Day, Van Devanter, Pitney, McReynolds, Brandeis, Clarke
- Concurrence: McKenna
- Overruled by
- Eisner v. Macomber

Towne v. Eisner, 245 U.S. 418 (1918), is a United States Supreme Court case in which the Court held that "a stock dividend based on accumulated profits was not 'income' within the true intent of the statute." Congress passed a new law in reaction to Towne v. Eisner and so the case was soon overturned by the Supreme Court in Eisner v. Macomber.

It includes the quotable passage: "A word is not a crystal, transparent and unchanged; it is the skin of a living thought and may vary greatly in colour and content according to the circumstances and time in which it is used." ― Oliver Wendell Holmes Jr.
