= Marvin Chirelstein =

American law professor

Marvin A. Chirelstein (October 8, 1928 - February 16, 2015) was a Professor Emeritus of Law at Columbia Law School, where he taught for nearly 30 years. He taught a contracts course to first year law students as well as tax and corporate finance courses. Prior to teaching at Columbia, Professor Chirelstein taught for over 15 years at Yale Law School. He authored several course books on law.

== Biography ==
Chirelstein received his B.A. from the University of California, Berkeley in 1950. Chirelstein received his J.D. from the University of Chicago Law School in 1953, where he was also editor of the University of Chicago Law Review. After practicing in Washington, D.C. and New York City, he joined the Yale Law School faculty in 1965 and remained at Yale as the William Nelson Cromwell Professor of Law until 1981. Chirelstein was visiting professor at Harvard Law School from 1976 to 1977, and at Columbia Law School from 1981 to 1982. He left for private practice in 1982, but returned to join the Columbia faculty in 1984.

== Publications ==
=== Books ===
- Federal Income Taxation: A Law Student's Guide to the Leading Cases and Concepts (Foundation Press, 3d ed. 1982)
- Cases and Materials on Corporate Finance
- Chirelstein, Marvin A. (2013). Concepts and Case Analysis in the Law of Contracts, 7th Edition. Foundation Press. ISBN 978-1609303303.
- Chirelstein, Marvin A.; Zelenak, Lawrence A. (2011). Federal Income Taxation, 12th Edition. Foundation Press. ISBN 978-1599419374.

=== Journal articles ===
- Brudney, Victor; Chirelstein, Marvin A. (December 1974). "Fair Shares in Corporate Mergers and Takeovers". Harvard Law Review. 88 (2): 297–346. doi:10.2307/1340268. JSTOR 1340268.
- Brudney, Victor; Chirelstein, Marvin A. (1977). "A Restatement of Corporate Freezeouts". Yale Law Journal. 87 (7): 1354. doi:10.2307/795767. JSTOR 795767.
- Chirelstein, Marvin A. (January 1968). "Learned Hand's Contribution to the Law of Tax Avoidance". Yale Law Journal. 77 (3): 440–474. doi:10.2307/794940. JSTOR 794940.
- Chirelstein, Marvin A. (April 1969). "Optional Redemptions and Optional Dividends: Taxing the Repurchase of Common Shares". Yale Law Journal. 78 (5): 739–756. doi:10.2307/794989. JSTOR 794989.
- Chirelstein, Marvin A. (1981). "Towards a Federal Fiduciary Standards Act". Cleveland State Law Review. 30: 203.
- Chirelstein, Marvin A.; Zelenak, Lawrence A. (October 2005). "Tax Shelters and the Search for a Silver Bullet". Columbia Law Review. 105 (6): 1939–1966. JSTOR 4099506.
- Zelenak, Lawrence A.; Chirelstein, Marvin A. (October 2005). "A Note on Tax Shelters". Columbia Law Review. SSRN 745385.
