= Pollock v. Farmers' Loan & Trust Co. =

1895 U.S. Supreme Court case on the constitutionality of federal income taxes

- Supreme Court of the United States

Argued March 7–8, 11–13, 1895 Decided April 8, 1895
- Full case name: Charles Pollock v. Farmers' Loan and Trust Company
- Citations: 157 U.S. 429 (more) 15 S. Ct. 673; 39 L. Ed. 759; 1895 U.S. LEXIS 2215; 3 A.F.T.R. (P-H) 2557

Case history
- Prior: Appeal from the Circuit Court of the United States for the Southern District of New York

Holding
- The unapportioned income taxes on interest, dividends, and rents imposed by the Income Tax Act of 1894 were, in effect, direct taxes, and were unconstitutional because they violated the rule that direct taxes be apportioned.

Court membership
- Chief Justice Melville Fuller Associate Justices Stephen J. Field · John M. Harlan; Horace Gray · David J. Brewer; Henry B. Brown · George Shiras Jr. Howell E. Jackson · Edward D. White

Case opinions
- Majority: Fuller, joined by Field, Gray, Brewer, Shiras
- Concurrence: Field
- Dissent: White, joined by Harlan
- Dissent: Harlan
- Dissent: Brown
- Dissent: Jackson

Laws applied
- U.S. Const. Art. I, § 9, cl. 4
- Superseded by
- U.S. Const. amend. XVI (in part)
- Overruled by
- South Carolina v. Baker, 485 U.S. 505 (1988) (in part)

Pollock v. Farmers' Loan & Trust Company, 157 U.S. 429 (1895), affirmed on rehearing, 158 U.S. 601 (1895), was a landmark case of the Supreme Court of the United States. In a 5–4 decision, the Supreme Court struck down the income tax imposed by the Wilson–Gorman Tariff Act for being an unapportioned direct tax. This decision was superseded in 1913 by the Sixteenth Amendment to the United States Constitution, which allows Congress to levy income taxes without apportioning them among the states.

The US Congress had introduced an income tax during the American Civil War, but the tax was repealed in 1872. In 1894, Congress passed the Wilson-Gorman Tariff Act, which lowered tariff rates and made up for some of the lost revenue by introducing taxes on income, corporate profits, gifts, and inheritances. Chief Justice Melville Fuller's majority opinion in Pollock held that a federal tax on income derived from property was unconstitutional when it was not apportioned among the states according to representation in the House of Representatives. Fuller also held that federal taxation of interest earned on certain state bonds violated the doctrine of intergovernmental tax immunity. In one dissent, Associate Justice Henry Billings Brown wrote that the majority opinion "involves nothing less than the surrender of the taxing power to the moneyed class."

The ratification of the Sixteenth Amendment essentially overturned the key holding in Pollock, and Congress established a new federal income tax in the Revenue Act of 1913. The Court's holding regarding the taxation of interest income on certain bonds was later overruled in the 1988 case of South Carolina v. Baker.

== Before Pollock ==
=== Early income tax ===
In order to help pay for its war effort in the American Civil War, Congress imposed the first federal income tax in U.S. history through passage of the Revenue Act of 1861. The act created a flat tax of three percent on incomes above $800 ($28,700 in current dollar terms). The taxation of income reflected the increasing amount of wealth held in stocks and bonds, rather than property, which the federal government had taxed in the past. Congress later further raised taxes, and by the end of the war, the income tax constituted about one fifth of the revenue of the federal government. The federal income tax remained in effect until its repeal in 1872. The constitutionality of the federal income tax was later upheld by the Supreme Court in the 1881 case of Springer v. United States.

The Socialist Labor Party advocated a graduated income tax in 1887. The Populist Party "demanded a graduated income tax" in its 1892 platform.

=== Wilson-Gorman Tariff Act ===
After winning control of Congress and the presidency in the 1892 elections, the Democratic Party made tariff reduction a key priority. President Grover Cleveland and his congressional allies proposed a bill that affected moderate downward revisions in the tariff, especially on raw materials. The shortfall in revenue was to be made up by an income tax of two percent on income above $4,000, equivalent to $143,000 today. Corporate profits, gifts, and inheritances would also be taxed at a two percent rate. The bill would restore the federal income tax for the first time since the 1870s; supporters of the income tax believed that it would help reduce income inequality and shift the burden of taxation to the wealthy.

The Democratic controlled Congress was ambivalent about the income tax but included it in the proposed bill in large part because of the efforts of Congressmen William Jennings Bryan and Benton McMillin. Despite strong conservative opposition to the income tax in the U.S. Senate, it remained a component of the final tariff bill, partly because many members of Congress believed that the US Supreme Court would eventually declare the tax to be unconstitutional. In August 1894, the bill became law as the Wilson–Gorman Tariff Act.

== Plaintiff ==
In compliance with the Act, the New York-based Farmers' Loan & Trust Company announced to its shareholders that it would not only pay the tax but also provide, to the collector of internal revenue in the Department of the Treasury, the names of all people for whom the company was acting and thus were liable for being taxed under the Act.

Charles Pollock was a Massachusetts citizen who owned only ten shares of stock in the Farmers' Loan & Trust Company. He sued the company to prevent the company from paying the tax. He lost in the lower courts but finally appealed to the United States Supreme Court, which agreed to hear the case.

Arguing for Pollock was Joseph Hodges Choate, one of the most eminent Wall Street lawyers of his day.

== Decision ==
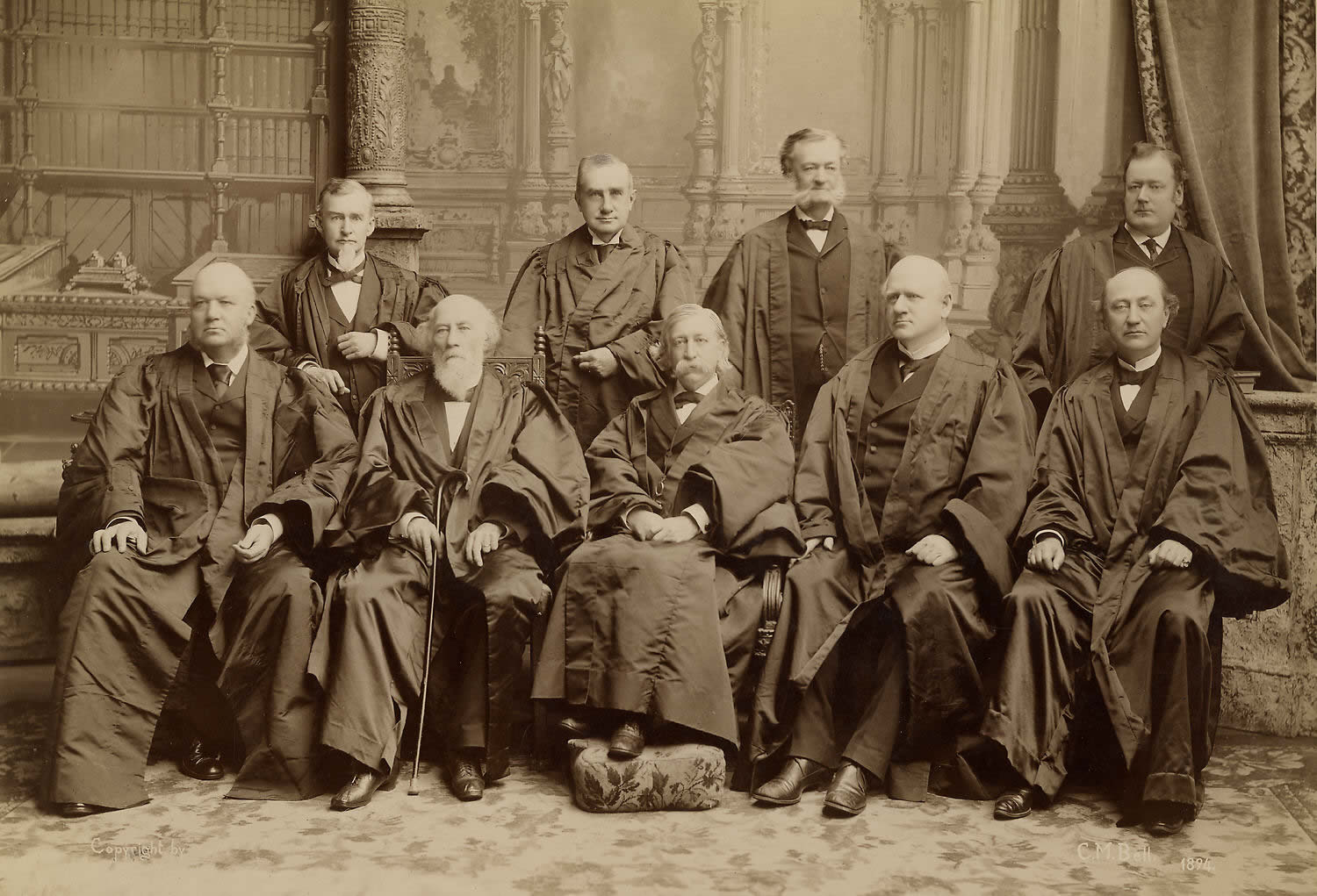
The Fuller Court.

The Court handed down its decision on April 8, 1895. All told, it was one of the longest set of opinions in Supreme Court history up to that point. Chief Justice Melville Fuller delivered the opinion of the Court. He ruled in Pollock's favor by stating that the taxes levied by the Wilson-Gorman Act on income from property were unconstitutional. The Court treated the tax on income from property as a direct tax. The Constitution of the United States then said that such direct taxes were required to be imposed in proportion to the states' population. The tax in question had not been apportioned and so was invalid.

The Supreme Court did not rule all income taxes were direct taxes. Instead, it held that although generally income taxes are indirect taxes (excises) authorized by the United States Constitution in Article 1, Section 8, Clause 1, taxes on interest, dividends, and rents in the 1894 Act had a profound effect on the underlying assets. The Court ruled that the tax on dividends, interest, and rent should be viewed as a direct tax, as they fell on the property itself, rather than as an indirect tax. Direct taxes were required to follow the rule of apportionment found in Article 1, Section 2, Clause 3. The rule of apportionment requires the amount of a direct tax collected to be divided by the number of members in the United States House of Representatives, with the quotient then multiplied by the number of representatives each state has to determine each state's share of the tax that it then needs to lay and collect, through its own taxing authority.

A separate holding by the Court in Pollock, that federal taxation of interest earned on certain state bonds violated the doctrine of intergovernmental tax immunity, was declared by the U.S. Supreme Court in 1988 to have been "effectively overruled by subsequent case law" (see South Carolina v. Baker).

=== Dissent ===
Justices John Marshall Harlan, Howell Edmunds Jackson, Edward Douglass White, and Henry Billings Brown dissented from the majority opinion. Justice White argued the government should not lose "an inherent attribute of its being", that of taxation.

In his own dissent, Justice Brown wrote:

The decision involves nothing less than the surrender of the taxing power to the moneyed class. By resuscitating an argument that was exploded in the Hylton Case, and has lain practically dormant for a hundred years, it is made to do duty in nullifying, not this law alone, but every similar law that is not based upon an impossible theory of apportionment. Even the spectre of socialism is conjured up to frighten Congress from laying taxes upon the people in proportion to their ability to pay them.

== Subsequent history ==
In the years after Pollock, Congress did not implement another federal income tax, partly because many Congressmen feared that any tax would be struck down by the Supreme Court. Few considered attempting to impose an apportioned income tax since such a tax was widely regarded as unworkable. Justice Harlan had predicted that in his dissent in Pollock:

When, therefore, this court adjudges, as it does now adjudge, that Congress cannot impose a duty or tax upon personal property, or upon income arising either from rents of real estate or from personal property, including invested personal property, bonds, stocks, and investments of all kinds, except by apportioning the sum to be so raised among the States according to population, it practically decides that, without an amendment of the Constitution—two-thirds of both Houses of Congress and three-fourths of the States concurring—such property and incomes can never be made to contribute to the support of the national government.

=== Subsequent court treatments of Pollock and the Sixteenth Amendment ===
Nebraska Republican Senator Norris Brown publicly decried the Court's decision in Pollock and proposed a constitutional amendment to remove the requirement that certain income taxes to be apportioned among the states by population. Brown's proposal would be ratified in 1913 as the Sixteenth Amendment. The Sixteenth Amendment removed the requirement for those income taxes deemed to be direct in substance (such as taxes on income from property) to be apportioned among the states according to population. Thus, the effect of Pollock has indeed been overturned by the Sixteenth Amendment. The Revenue Act of 1913, which greatly lowered tariffs and implemented a federal income tax without apportionment among the states, was enacted shortly after the Sixteenth Amendment was ratified.

Three years after ratification of the Sixteenth Amendment, the United States Supreme Court rendered its decision in the case of Brushaber v. Union Pacific Railroad. In Brushaber, the Court reviewed the history of the dichotomy between excises (indirect taxes) and direct taxes. The Court noted that the 1913 Income Tax Act was written as an indirect tax and did not violate the rule of uniformity. Thus, it was not written as a direct tax and was not subject to the rule of apportionment. The Court summarized what it had decided in Pollock and then went on to state the effect of the Sixteenth Amendment with respect to income taxes:

[T]he command of the amendment that all income taxes shall not be subject to the rule of apportionment by a consideration of the source from which the taxed income may be derived forbids the application to such taxes of the rule applied in the Pollock case by which alone such taxes were removed from the great class of excises, duties, and imposts subject to the rule of uniformity and were placed under the other or direct class.

The Court in Brushaber also noted that before Pollock, taxes on income from professions, trades, employments, or vocations were excises. They were indirect in both form and substance and therefore had never been apportioned and thus they were entitled to be so enforced afterwards.

In contrast, with respect to taxes on income from property, the Pollock decision had disregarded form and considered substance alone. Justice White's decision in Brushaber shows how the Sixteenth Amendment was written to prevent consideration of the direct effects of any income tax laid by Congress.

The Supreme Court in Stanton v. Baltic Mining Co. added that the "Sixteenth Amendment conferred no new power of taxation but simply prohibited the previous complete and plenary power of income taxation possessed by Congress from the beginning from being taken out of the category of indirect taxation to which it inherently belonged." 240 U.S. 112 (1916).

That effect was reaffirmed in Bowers v. Kerbaugh-Empire Co., 271 U.S. 170 (1926), in which the Supreme Court reviewed Pollock, the Corporation Excise Tax Act of 1909, and the Sixteenth Amendment. The Court concluded, "It was not the purpose or effect of that amendment to bring any new subject within the taxing power. Congress already had power to tax all incomes."

== See also ==
- Hylton v. United States, 3 U.S. 171 (1796)
- United States v. E. C. Knight Co., 156 U.S. 1 (1895)
- Moore v. United States (2024)
