= List of United States Supreme Court cases, volume 240 =

Supreme Court of the United States
- Interactive map of Supreme Court of the United States
- 38°53′26″N 77°00′16″W
- Established: March 4, 1789; 236 years ago
- Location: Washington, D.C.
- Coordinates: 38°53′26″N 77°00′16″W
- Composition method: Presidential nomination with Senate confirmation
- Authorised by: Constitution of the United States, Art. III, § 1
- Judge term length: life tenure, subject to impeachment and removal
- Number of positions: 9 (by statute)
- Website: supremecourt.gov

This is a list of cases reported in volume 240 of United States Reports, decided by the Supreme Court of the United States in 1916.

== Justices of the Supreme Court at the time of volume 240 U.S. ==
The Supreme Court is established by Article III, Section 1 of the Constitution of the United States, which says: "The judicial Power of the United States, shall be vested in one supreme Court . . .". The size of the Court is not specified; the Constitution leaves it to Congress to set the number of justices. Under the Judiciary Act of 1789 Congress originally fixed the number of justices at six (one chief justice and five associate justices). Since 1789 Congress has varied the size of the Court from six to seven, nine, ten, and back to nine justices (always including one chief justice).

When the cases in volume 240 were decided the Court comprised the following nine members:

Portrait	Justice	Office	Home State	Succeeded	Date confirmed by the Senate (Vote)	Tenure on Supreme Court
	Edward Douglass White	Chief Justice	Louisiana	Melville Fuller	December 12, 1910 (Acclamation)	December 19, 1910 – May 19, 1921 (Died)
	Joseph McKenna	Associate Justice	California	Stephen Johnson Field	January 21, 1898 (Acclamation)	January 26, 1898 – January 5, 1925 (Retired)
	Oliver Wendell Holmes Jr.	Associate Justice	Massachusetts	Horace Gray	December 4, 1902 (Acclamation)	December 8, 1902 – January 12, 1932 (Retired)
	William R. Day	Associate Justice	Ohio	George Shiras Jr.	February 23, 1903 (Acclamation)	March 2, 1903 – November 13, 1922 (Retired)
	Charles Evans Hughes	Associate Justice	New York	David Josiah Brewer	May 2, 1910 (Acclamation)	October 10, 1910 – June 10, 1916 (Resigned)
	Willis Van Devanter	Associate Justice	Wyoming	Edward Douglass White (as Associate Justice)	December 15, 1910 (Acclamation)	January 3, 1911 – June 2, 1937 (Retired)
	Joseph Rucker Lamar	Associate Justice	Georgia	William Henry Moody	December 15, 1910 (Acclamation)	January 3, 1911 – January 2, 1916 (Died)
	Mahlon Pitney	Associate Justice	New Jersey	John Marshall Harlan	March 13, 1912 (50–26)	March 18, 1912 – December 31, 1922 (Resigned)
	James Clark McReynolds	Associate Justice	Tennessee	Horace Harmon Lurton	August 29, 1914 (44–6)	October 12, 1914 – January 31, 1941 (Retired)

== Notable Case in 240 U.S. ==
=== Brushaber v. Union Pacific Railroad Company ===
In Brushaber v. Union Pacific Railroad Company, 240 U.S. 1 (1916), the Supreme Court upheld the validity of a tax statute called the Revenue Act of 1913, enacted pursuant to Article I, section 8, clause 1 of, and the Sixteenth Amendment to, the United States Constitution, allowing a federal income tax. The Sixteenth Amendment had been ratified earlier in 1913. The Revenue Act of 1913 imposed income taxes that were not apportioned among the states according to each state's population.

== Citation style ==
Under the Judiciary Act of 1789 the federal court structure at the time comprised District Courts, which had general trial jurisdiction; Circuit Courts, which had mixed trial and appellate (from the US District Courts) jurisdiction; and the United States Supreme Court, which had appellate jurisdiction over the federal District and Circuit courts—and for certain issues over state courts. The Supreme Court also had limited original jurisdiction (i.e., in which cases could be filed directly with the Supreme Court without first having been heard by a lower federal or state court). There were one or more federal District Courts and/or Circuit Courts in each state, territory, or other geographical region.

The Judiciary Act of 1891 created the United States Courts of Appeals and reassigned the jurisdiction of most routine appeals from the district and circuit courts to these appellate courts. The Act created nine new courts that were originally known as the "United States Circuit Courts of Appeals." The new courts had jurisdiction over most appeals of lower court decisions. The Supreme Court could review either legal issues that a court of appeals certified or decisions of court of appeals by writ of certiorari. On January 1, 1912, the effective date of the Judicial Code of 1911, the old Circuit Courts were abolished, with their remaining trial court jurisdiction transferred to the U.S. District Courts.

Bluebook citation style is used for case names, citations, and jurisdictions.

- "# Cir." = United States Court of Appeals
  - e.g., "3d Cir." = United States Court of Appeals for the Third Circuit
- "D." = United States District Court for the District of . . .
  - e.g.,"D. Mass." = United States District Court for the District of Massachusetts
- "E." = Eastern; "M." = Middle; "N." = Northern; "S." = Southern; "W." = Western
  - e.g.,"M.D. Ala." = United States District Court for the Middle District of Alabama
- "Ct. Cl." = United States Court of Claims
- The abbreviation of a state's name alone indicates the highest appellate court in that state's judiciary at the time.
  - e.g.,"Pa." = Supreme Court of Pennsylvania
  - e.g.,"Me." = Supreme Judicial Court of Maine

== List of cases in volume 240 U.S. ==
Case Name	Page & year	Opinion of the Court	Concurring opinion(s)	Dissenting opinion(s)	Lower Court	Disposition
Brushaber v. Union Pacific Railroad Company	1 (1916)	White	none	none	S.D.N.Y.	affirmed
Fleitmann v. Welsbach Street Lighting Company	27 (1916)	Holmes	none	none	2d Cir.	affirmed
Mt. Vernon-Woodberry Cotton Duck Company v. Alabama Interstate Power Company	30 (1916)	Holmes	none	none	Ala.	affirmed
New York, Philadelphia and Norfolk Railroad Company v. Peninsula Produce Exchange of Maryland	34 (1916)	Hughes	none	none	Md.	affirmed
Loomis v. Lehigh Valley Railroad Company	43 (1916)	McReynolds	none	none	N.Y. Sup. Ct.	affirmed
Kansas City Western Railroad Company v. McAdow	51 (1916)	Holmes	none	none	Mo. Ct. App.	affirmed
Gast Realty and Investment Company v. Schneider Granite Company	55 (1916)	Holmes	none	none	Mo.	reversed
Lámar v. United States	60 (1916)	Holmes	none	none	S.D.N.Y.	dismissed
Illinois Central Railroad Company v. Skaggs	66 (1916)	Hughes	none	none	Minn.	affirmed
Crocker v. United States	74 (1916)	VanDevanter	none	none	Ct. Cl.	affirmed
Cardona v. Quiñones	83 (1916)	White	none	none	P.R.	affirmed
United States v. Andrews	90 (1916)	White	none	none	Ct. Cl.	affirmed
Male v. Atchison, Topeka and Santa Fe Railway Company	97 (1916)	White	none	none	S.D.N.Y.	affirmed
Stanton v. Baltic Mining Company	103 (1916)	White	none	none	D. Mass.	affirmed
Tyee Realty Company v. Anderson	115 (1916)	White	none	none	S.D.N.Y.	affirmed
Dodge v. Osborn	118 (1916)	White	none	none	D.C. Cir.	affirmed
Dodge v. Brady	122 (1916)	White	none	none	E.D. Mich.	affirmed
Innes v. Tobin	127 (1916)	White	none	none	Tex. Crim. App.	affirmed
Title Guaranty and Surety Company v. Idaho ex rel. Allen	136 (1916)	White	none	none	Idaho	dismissed
Banning Company v. California ex rel. Webb	142 (1916)	McKenna	none	none	Cal.	affirmed
Carnegie Steel Company v. United States	156 (1916)	McKenna	none	none	Ct. Cl.	affirmed
Kansas City Southern Railroad Company v. Guardian Trust Company	166 (1916)	Holmes	none	none	8th Cir.	affirmed
Straus v. Notaseme Hosiery Company	179 (1916)	Holmes	none	none	2d Cir.	reversed
Rogers v. Hennepin County	184 (1916)	Hughes	none	none	Minn.	affirmed
United States v. Morrison	192 (1916)	Hughes	none	none	9th Cir.	reversed
Illinois Surety Company v. United States ex rel. Peeler	214 (1916)	Hughes	none	none	4th Cir.	affirmed
Kansas City, Fort Scott, and Memphis Railroad Company v. Botkin, Secretary of State of Kansas	227 (1916)	Hughes	none	none	Kan.	affirmed
Lusk v. Botkin, Secretary of State of Kansas	236 (1916)	Hughes	none	none	Kan.	affirmed
St. Louis–San Francisco Railway Company v. Shepherd	240 (1916)	VanDevanter	none	none	Okla.	dismissed
Embree v. Kansas City and Liberty Boulevard Road District	242 (1916)	VanDevanter	none	none	Mo.	affirmed
Hamilton-Brown Shoe Company v. Wolf Brothers and Company	251 (1916)	Pitney	none	none	8th Cir.	affirmed
Guerini Stone Company v. P.J. Carlin Construction Company	264 (1916)	Pitney	none	none	D.P.R.	reversed
Union Naval Stores Company v. United States	284 (1916)	Pitney	none	none	5th Cir.	affirmed
O'Keefe v. United States	294 (1916)	Pitney	none	none	E.D. La.	affirmed
Carolina Glass Company v. South Carolina	305 (1916)	McReynolds	none	none	multiple	multiple
Fidelity and Deposit Company of Maryland v. Pennsylvania	319 (1916)	McReynolds	none	none	Pa.	affirmed
Seaboard Air Line Railroad Company v. Railroad Commission of Georgia	324 (1916)	McReynolds	none	none	5th Cir.	affirmed
Butler v. Perry	328 (1916)	McReynolds	none	none	Fla.	affirmed
Philadelphia and Reading Railroad Company v. United States	334 (1916)	McReynolds	none	none	E.D. Pa.	reversed
Rast v. Van Deman and Lewis Company	342 (1916)	McKenna	none	none	S.D. Fla.	reversed
Tanner v. Little	369 (1916)	McKenna	none	none	E.D. Wash.	reversed
Pitney v. Washington	387 (1916)	McKenna	none	none	Wash.	affirmed
Badders v. United States	391 (1916)	Holmes	none	none	D. Kan.	affirmed
Illinois Central Railroad Company v. Messina	395 (1916)	Holmes	none	Hughes	Miss.	reversed
Causey v. United States	399 (1916)	VanDevanter	none	none	5th Cir.	affirmed
Hanover Star Milling Company v. Metcalf	403 (1916)	Pitney	Holmes	none	multiple	multiple
Eaton v. Boston Safe Deposit and Trust Company	427 (1916)	Holmes	none	none	Mass.	affirmed
Carey v. Donohue	430 (1916)	Hughes	none	none	6th Cir.	reversed
Pecos and Northern Texas Railroad Company v. Rosenbloom	439 (1916)	McReynolds	none	none	Tex.	reversed
United States v. U.S. Steel Corporation	442 (1916)	White	none	none	D.N.J.	filing time extended
Great Northern Railroad Company v. Wiles	444 (1916)	McKenna	none	none	Minn.	reversed
Chicago, Rock Island and Pacific Railroad Company v. Bond	449 (1916)	McKenna	none	none	Okla.	reversed
Southern Wisconsin Railroad Company v. Madison	457 (1916)	Holmes	none	none	Wis.	affirmed
Cuyahoga River P. Company v. City of Akron	462 (1916)	Holmes	none	none	N.D. Ohio	reversed
Great Northern Railroad Company v. Knapp	464 (1916)	Hughes	none	none	Minn.	affirmed
Johnson v. Riddle	467 (1916)	Pitney	none	none	Okla.	affirmed
Barlow v. Northern Pacific Railroad Company	484 (1916)	White	none	none	N.D.	affirmed
Seaboard Air Line Railroad Company v. Kenney	489 (1916)	White	none	none	N.C.	affirmed
Farmers' and Mechanics' National Bank of Philadelphia v. Ridge Avenue Bank	498 (1916)	White	none	none	3d Cir.	certification
Armour and Company v. North Dakota	510 (1916)	McKenna	none	none	N.D.	affirmed
St. Louis, Iron Mountain and Southern Railway Company v. Arkansas	518 (1916)	McKenna	none	none	Ark.	affirmed
Indian Territory Illuminating Oil Company v. Oklahoma	522 (1916)	McKenna	none	none	Okla.	reversed
Ackerlind v. United States	531 (1916)	Holmes	none	none	Ct. Cl.	reversed
Farnham v. United States	537 (1916)	Hughes	none	none	Ct. Cl.	affirmed
Jones National Bank v. Yates	541 (1916)	Hughes	none	none	Neb.	reversed
Detroit and Mackinac Railway Company v. Michigan Railroad Commission	564 (1916)	VanDevanter	none	none	Mich.	affirmed
Willink v. United States	572 (1916)	VanDevanter	none	none	Ct. Cl.	affirmed
Central Trust Company v. Chicago Auditorium Association	581 (1916)	Pitney	none	none	7th Cir.	multiple
Pinel v. Pinel	594 (1916)	Pitney	none	none	E.D. Mich.	affirmed
Uterhart v. United States	598 (1916)	Pitney	none	none	Ct. Cl.	reversed
United States v. Union Manufacturing Company	605 (1916)	Pitney	none	none	S.D. Fla.	reversed
Southern Express Company v. Byers	612 (1916)	McReynolds	none	none	N.C.	reversed
Varner v. New Hampshire Savings Bank	617 (1916)	McReynolds	none	none	8th Cir.	affirmed
Baltimore and Ohio Railroad Company v. Hostetter	620 (1916)	White	none	none	W. Va. Cir. Ct.	reversed
Bullen v. Wisconsin	625 (1916)	Holmes	none	none	Waukesha Cnty. Ct.	affirmed
Southern Railroad Company v. Prescott	632 (1916)	Hughes	none	none	S.C.	reversed
Fairbanks Steamship Company v. Wills	642 (1916)	Pitney	none	none	7th Cir.	affirmed
Georgia v. Tennessee Copper Company	650 (1916)	per curiam	none	none	original	order entered
North Carolina v. Tennessee	652 (1916)	per curiam	none	none	original	boundary set
