= List of United States Supreme Court cases, volume 157 =

Supreme Court of the United States
- Interactive map of Supreme Court of the United States
- 38°53′26″N 77°00′16″W
- Established: March 4, 1789; 236 years ago
- Location: Washington, D.C.
- Coordinates: 38°53′26″N 77°00′16″W
- Composition method: Presidential nomination with Senate confirmation
- Authorised by: Constitution of the United States, Art. III, § 1
- Judge term length: life tenure, subject to impeachment and removal
- Number of positions: 9 (by statute)
- Website: supremecourt.gov

This is a list of cases reported in volume 157 of United States Reports, decided by the Supreme Court of the United States in 1895.

== Justices of the Supreme Court at the time of volume 157 U.S. ==
The Supreme Court is established by Article III, Section 1 of the Constitution of the United States, which says: "The judicial Power of the United States, shall be vested in one supreme Court . . .". The size of the Court is not specified; the Constitution leaves it to Congress to set the number of justices. Under the Judiciary Act of 1789 Congress originally fixed the number of justices at six (one chief justice and five associate justices). Since 1789 Congress has varied the size of the Court from six to seven, nine, ten, and back to nine justices (always including one chief justice).

When the cases in volume 157 were decided the Court comprised the following nine members:

Portrait	Justice	Office	Home State	Succeeded	Date confirmed by the Senate (Vote)	Tenure on Supreme Court
	Melville Fuller	Chief Justice	Illinois	Morrison Waite	July 20, 1888 (41–20)	October 8, 1888 – July 4, 1910 (Died)
	Stephen Johnson Field	Associate Justice	California	newly created seat	March 10, 1863 (Acclamation)	May 10, 1863 – December 1, 1897 (Retired)
	John Marshall Harlan	Associate Justice	Kentucky	David Davis	November 29, 1877 (Acclamation)	December 10, 1877 – October 14, 1911 (Died)
	Horace Gray	Associate Justice	Massachusetts	Nathan Clifford	December 20, 1881 (51–5)	January 9, 1882 – September 15, 1902 (Died)
	David Josiah Brewer	Associate Justice	Kansas	Stanley Matthews	December 18, 1889 (53–11)	January 6, 1890 – March 28, 1910 (Died)
	Henry Billings Brown	Associate Justice	Michigan	Samuel Freeman Miller	December 29, 1890 (Acclamation)	January 5, 1891 – May 28, 1906 (Retired)
	George Shiras Jr.	Associate Justice	Pennsylvania	Joseph P. Bradley	July 26, 1892 (Acclamation)	October 10, 1892 – February 23, 1903 (Retired)
	Howell Edmunds Jackson	Associate Justice	Tennessee	Lucius Quintus Cincinnatus Lamar	February 18, 1893 (Acclamation)	March 4, 1893 – August 8, 1895 (Died)
	Edward Douglass White	Associate Justice	Louisiana	Samuel Blatchford	February 19, 1894 (Acclamation)	March 12, 1894 – December 18, 1910 (Continued as chief justice)

== Notable Case in 157 U.S. ==
=== Pollock v. Farmers' Loan & Trust Co. ===
Pollock v. Farmers' Loan & Trust Co., 157 U.S. 429, affirmed on rehearing, 158 U.S. 601 (1895), was a landmark case of the Supreme Court of the United States. In a 5-to-4 decision, the Court struck down the income tax imposed by the Wilson–Gorman Tariff Act for being an unapportioned direct tax. The decision was superseded in 1913 by the Sixteenth Amendment to the United States Constitution, which allows Congress to levy income taxes without apportioning them among the states.

== Citation style ==
Under the Judiciary Act of 1789 the federal court structure at the time comprised District Courts, which had general trial jurisdiction; Circuit Courts, which had mixed trial and appellate (from the US District Courts) jurisdiction; and the United States Supreme Court, which had appellate jurisdiction over the federal District and Circuit courts—and for certain issues over state courts. The Supreme Court also had limited original jurisdiction (i.e., in which cases could be filed directly with the Supreme Court without first having been heard by a lower federal or state court). There were one or more federal District Courts and/or Circuit Courts in each state, territory, or other geographical region.

The Judiciary Act of 1891 created the United States Courts of Appeals and reassigned the jurisdiction of most routine appeals from the district and circuit courts to these appellate courts. The Act created nine new courts that were originally known as the "United States Circuit Courts of Appeals." The new courts had jurisdiction over most appeals of lower court decisions. The Supreme Court could review either legal issues that a court of appeals certified or decisions of court of appeals by writ of certiorari.

Bluebook citation style is used for case names, citations, and jurisdictions.

- "# Cir." = United States Court of Appeals
  - e.g., "3d Cir." = United States Court of Appeals for the Third Circuit
- "C.C.D." = United States Circuit Court for the District of . . .
  - e.g.,"C.C.D.N.J." = United States Circuit Court for the District of New Jersey
- "D." = United States District Court for the District of . . .
  - e.g.,"D. Mass." = United States District Court for the District of Massachusetts
- "E." = Eastern; "M." = Middle; "N." = Northern; "S." = Southern; "W." = Western
  - e.g.,"C.C.S.D.N.Y." = United States Circuit Court for the Southern District of New York
  - e.g.,"M.D. Ala." = United States District Court for the Middle District of Alabama
- "Ct. Cl." = United States Court of Claims
- The abbreviation of a state's name alone indicates the highest appellate court in that state's judiciary at the time.
  - e.g.,"Pa." = Supreme Court of Pennsylvania
  - e.g.,"Me." = Supreme Judicial Court of Maine

== List of cases in volume 157 U.S. ==
Case Name	Page & year	Opinion of the Court	Concurring opinion(s)	Dissenting opinion(s)	Lower Court	Disposition
Bate Refrigerating Co. v. Sulzberger	1 (1895)	Harlan	none	none	2d Cir.	certification
Frost v. Wenie	46 (1895)	Harlan	none	none	C.C.D. Kan.	affirmed
The Ludvig Holberg	60 (1895)	Brown	none	none	C.C.S.D.N.Y.	affirmed
Baltimore & P.R.R. Co. v. MacKey	72 (1895)	Harlan	none	none	Sup. Ct. D.C.	affirmed
Pullman P.C. Co. v. Metropolitan St. Ry. Co.	94 (1895)	Harlan	none	none	C.C.W.D. Mo.	reversed
United States v. Piatt	113 (1895)	Harlan	none	none	C.C.N.D. Cal.	reversed
United States v. Salisbury	121 (1895)	Harlan	none	none	C.C.N.D. Cal.	reversed
The Caledonia	124 (1895)	Fuller	none	Brown	C.C.D. Mass.	affirmed
Cooper v. Dobson	148 (1895)	Shiras	none	none	C.C.E.D. Pa.	reversed
Neel v. Pennsylvania Co.	153 (1895)	Fuller	none	none	C.C.N.D. Ohio	reversed
Beuttell v. Magone	154 (1895)	White	none	none	C.C.S.D.N.Y.	reversed
Frisbie v. United States	160 (1895)	Brewer	none	none	C.C.E.D. La.	affirmed
Shields v. Coleman	168 (1895)	Brewer	none	none	C.C.E.D. Tenn.	continued
Seeberger v. Wright et al. Co.	183 (1895)	Brown	none	none	C.C.N.D. Ill.	affirmed
Stokes v. United States	187 (1895)	Brown	none	none	C.C.S.D. Ala.	affirmed
Morgan v. Potter	195 (1895)	Gray	none	none	8th Cir.	certification
Michels v. Olmstead	198 (1895)	Gray	none	none	C.C.W.D. Mo.	affirmed
Mexican N.R.R. Co. v. Davidson	201 (1895)	Fuller	none	none	2d Cir.	certification
Chicago et al. R.R. Co. v. Pontius	209 (1895)	Fuller	none	none	Kan.	affirmed
Baker v. Wood	212 (1895)	Fuller	none	none	C.C.D. Colo.	reversed
New Orleans et al. R.R. Co. v. Louisiana ex rel. City of New Orleans	219 (1895)	Harlan	none	none	La.	affirmed
Pennsylvania R.R. Co. v. Wabash et al. Ry. Co.	225 (1895)	Harlan	none	none	C.C.N.D. Ill.	affirmed
California v. Southern P. Co.	229 (1895)	Fuller	Field	Harlan	original	dismissed
Wailes v. Smith	271 (1895)	White	none	none	Md.	dismissed
Statler v. United States	277 (1895)	White	none	none	W.D. Pa.	affirmed
United States v. Sweeny	281 (1895)	Brown	none	none	Ct. Cl.	reversed
Cochran v. United States	286 (1895)	Brown	none	none	D. Colo.	reversed
Reagan v. United States	301 (1895)	Brewer	none	none	W.D. Tex.	affirmed
Sanford F. & T. Co. v. Howe Brown & Co.	312 (1895)	Brewer	none	none	C.C.D. Ind.	reversed
Johnson v. United States	320 (1895)	Brewer	none	none	C.C.W.D. Ark.	affirmed
Bardon v. Land & R.I. Co.	327 (1895)	Fuller	none	none	C.C.W.D. Wis.	affirmed
Walton v. Marietta C. Co.	342 (1895)	Gray	none	none	C.C.S.D. Ohio	amendment granted
Gulf et al. Ry. Co. v. Shane	348 (1895)	White	none	none	Ct. Indian Terr.	reversed
Barney v. Rickard	352 (1895)	Fuller	none	none	C.C.S.D.N.Y.	reversed
Colvin v. City of Jacksonville	368 (1895)	Shiras	none	none	C.C.S.D. Fla.	dismissed
Stevens' Adm'r v. Nichols	370 (1895)	Brewer	none	none	Mo.	affirmed
Orchard v. Alexander	372 (1895)	Brewer	none	none	Wash.	affirmed
Ralli v. Troop	386 (1895)	Gray	none	Brown	C.C.S.D.N.Y.	reversed
Lutcher v. United States	427 (1895)	Fuller	none	none	C.C.E.D. Tex.	dismissed
Pollock v. Farmers' Loan & Trust Co.	429 (1895)	Fuller	Field	White; Harlan	C.C.S.D.N.Y.	reversed
Hyde v. Continental T. Co.	654 (1895)	Fuller	none	none	C.C.S.D.N.Y.	reversed
Bergemann v. Backer	655 (1895)	Harlan	none	none	C.C.D.N.J.	affirmed
Keeler v. Standard F.B. Co.	659 (1895)	Shiras	none	Brown	C.C.D. Mass.	reversed
D. Rankin B. Mfg. Co. v. Barber	673 (1895)	Fuller	none	none	C.C.D. Ind.	dismissed
Treat Mfg. Co. v. Standard S.I. Co.	674 (1895)	Fuller	none	none	C.C.N.D. Ill.	dismissed
Allen v. United States	675 (1895)	Shiras	none	none	C.C.W.D. Ark.	reversed
Jones v. East Tennessee et al. R.R. Co.	682 (1895)	Fuller	none	none	C.C.E.D. Tenn.	affirmed
Last Chance M. Co. v. Tyler M. Co.	683 (1895)	Brewer	none	none	9th Cir.	reversed
Lambert v. Barrett	697 (1895)	Fuller	none	none	C.C.D.N.J.	dismissed

== See also ==
- Certificate of division
