= Union Pacific Railway Co. v. Botsford =

Union Pacific Railway Company v. Botsford
- Supreme Court of the United States

Argued January 6, 1891 Decided May 25, 1891
- Full case name: Union Pacific Railway Company v. Botsford
- Citations: 141 U.S. 250 (more) 11 S. Ct. 1000; 35 L. Ed. 734

Court membership
- Chief Justice Melville Fuller Associate Justices Stephen J. Field · Joseph P. Bradley; John M. Harlan · Horace Gray; Samuel Blatchford · Lucius Q. C. Lamar II; David J. Brewer · Henry B. Brown

Case opinions
- Majority: Gray, joined by Fuller, Field, Bradley, Harlan, Gray, Blatchford, Lamar
- Dissent: Brewer, joined by Brown

Union Pacific Railway Company v. Botsford, 141 U.S. 250 (1891), was a case before the United States Supreme Court.

== Background ==
A railroad passenger, Clara L. Botsford, sustained permanent injuries to her brain and spinal cord when a berth from a sleeping car fell upon her head. She sued the railroad for negligence in the construction of the railroad car which allegedly caused her injuries. The Union Pacific Railway Company claimed that it was entitled, without her consent, to an opportunity to surgically examine her to determine her diagnosis and the extent of her injuries.

== Decision ==
The court disagreed, holding that there was no authority under the common law or statutory law for the trial court to order such an examination: "No right is held more sacred, or is more carefully guarded by the common law, than the right of every individual to the possession and control of his own person, free from all restraint or interference of others, unless by clear and unquestionable authority of law."

== See also ==
- Union Pacific R. Co. v. Cheyenne (1885)
- Kansas Pacific R. Co. v. Dunmeyer (1885)
- Brushaber v. Union Pacific Railroad (1916)
- Union Pacific Railroad v. Brotherhood of Locomotive Engineers (2009)
