= List of United States Supreme Court cases, volume 284 =

Supreme Court of the United States
- Interactive map of Supreme Court of the United States
- 38°53′26″N 77°00′16″W
- Established: March 4, 1789; 237 years ago
- Location: Washington, D.C.
- Coordinates: 38°53′26″N 77°00′16″W
- Composition method: Presidential nomination with Senate confirmation
- Authorised by: Constitution of the United States, Art. III, § 1
- Judge term length: life tenure, subject to impeachment and removal
- Number of positions: 9 (by statute)
- Website: supremecourt.gov

This is a list of cases reported in volume 284 of United States Reports, decided by the Supreme Court of the United States in 1931 and 1932.

== Justices of the Supreme Court at the time of volume 284 U.S. ==
The Supreme Court is established by Article III, Section 1 of the Constitution of the United States, which says: "The judicial Power of the United States, shall be vested in one supreme Court . . .". The size of the Court is not specified; the Constitution leaves it to Congress to set the number of justices. Under the Judiciary Act of 1789 Congress originally fixed the number of justices at six (one chief justice and five associate justices). Since 1789 Congress has varied the size of the Court from six to seven, nine, ten, and back to nine justices (always including one chief justice).

When the cases in volume 284 were decided the Court comprised the following nine members:

| Portrait | Justice | Office | Home State | Succeeded | Date confirmed by the Senate (Vote) | Tenure on Supreme Court |
|---|---|---|---|---|---|---|
| | Charles Evans Hughes | Chief Justice | New York | William Howard Taft | February 13, 1930 (52–26) | February 24, 1930 – June 30, 1941 (Retired) |
| | Oliver Wendell Holmes Jr. | Associate Justice | Massachusetts | Horace Gray | December 4, 1902 (Acclamation) | December 8, 1902 – January 12, 1932 (Retired) |
| | Willis Van Devanter | Associate Justice | Wyoming | Edward Douglass White (as Associate Justice) | December 15, 1910 (Acclamation) | January 3, 1911 – June 2, 1937 (Retired) |
| | James Clark McReynolds | Associate Justice | Tennessee | Horace Harmon Lurton | August 29, 1914 (44–6) | October 12, 1914 – January 31, 1941 (Retired) |
| | Louis Brandeis | Associate Justice | Massachusetts | Joseph Rucker Lamar | June 1, 1916 (47–22) | June 5, 1916 – February 13, 1939 (Retired) |
| | George Sutherland | Associate Justice | Utah | John Hessin Clarke | September 5, 1922 (Acclamation) | October 2, 1922 – January 17, 1938 (Retired) |
| | Pierce Butler | Associate Justice | Minnesota | William R. Day | December 21, 1922 (61–8) | January 2, 1923 – November 16, 1939 (Died) |
| | Harlan F. Stone | Associate Justice | New York | Joseph McKenna | February 5, 1925 (71–6) | March 2, 1925 – July 2, 1941 (Continued as chief justice) |
| | Owen Roberts | Associate Justice | Pennsylvania | Edward Terry Sanford | May 20, 1930 (Acclamation) | June 2, 1930 – July 31, 1945 (Resigned) |

== Notable Case in 284 U.S. ==
=== Blockberger v. United States ===
Blockburger v. United States, 284 U.S. 299 (1932), is a landmark decision which established the "same elements test" to determine if two offenses are the same for the purposes of double jeopardy. Under the Blockburger test, a defendant may be convicted of two offenses arising out of the same criminal incident if each crime contains an element that is not found in the other.

== Federal court system ==
Under the Judiciary Act of 1789 the federal court structure at the time comprised District Courts, which had general trial jurisdiction; Circuit Courts, which had mixed trial and appellate (from the US District Courts) jurisdiction; and the United States Supreme Court, which had appellate jurisdiction over the federal District and Circuit courts—and for certain issues over state courts. The Supreme Court also had limited original jurisdiction (i.e., in which cases could be filed directly with the Supreme Court without first having been heard by a lower federal or state court). There were one or more federal District Courts and/or Circuit Courts in each state, territory, or other geographical region.

The Judiciary Act of 1891 created the United States Courts of Appeals and reassigned the jurisdiction of most routine appeals from the district and circuit courts to these appellate courts. The Act created nine new courts that were originally known as the "United States Circuit Courts of Appeals." The new courts had jurisdiction over most appeals of lower court decisions. The Supreme Court could review either legal issues that a court of appeals certified or decisions of court of appeals by writ of certiorari. On January 1, 1912, the effective date of the Judicial Code of 1911, the old Circuit Courts were abolished, with their remaining trial court jurisdiction transferred to the U.S. District Courts.

== List of cases in volume 284 U.S. ==
| Case name | Citation | Opinion of the Court | Vote | Concurring opinion or statement | Dissenting opinion or statement | Procedural jurisdiction | Result |
|---|---|---|---|---|---|---|---|
| United States v. Kirby Lumber Company | 284 U.S. 1 (1931) | Holmes | 9–0 | none | none | certiorari to the United States Court of Claims (Ct. Cl.) | judgment reversed |
| Moore v. Bay | 284 U.S. 4 (1931) | Holmes | 9–0 | none | none | certiorari to the United States Court of Appeals for the Ninth Circuit (9th Cir.) | decree reversed |
| Public Service Commission of Indiana v. Batesville Telephone Company | 284 U.S. 6 (1931) | per curiam | 9–0 | none | none | appeal from the United States Court of Appeals for the Seventh Circuit (7th Cir.) | appeal dismissed |
| Bandini Petroleum Company v. Superior Court, Los Angeles County | 284 U.S. 8 (1931) | Hughes | 9–0 | none | none | appeal from the California Courts of Appeal (Cal. Dist. Ct. App.) | judgment affirmed |
| Cumberland Coal Company v. Board of Revision of Tax Assessments in Greene County, Pennsylvania | 284 U.S. 23 (1931) | Hughes | 9–0 | none | none | certiorari to the Pennsylvania Supreme Court (Pa.) | decrees reversed, and causes remanded |
| Santovincenzo, Consul General of Italy at New York v. Egan | 284 U.S. 30 (1931) | Hughes | 9–0 | none | none | appeal from the New York County Surrogate's Court (N.Y. Cnty. Sur. Ct.) | decree reversed, and cause remanded |
| State Tax Commission of Mississippi v. Interstate Natural Gas Company | 284 U.S. 41 (1931) | Holmes | 9–0 | none | none | appeal from the United States District Court for the Southern District of Mississippi (S.D. Miss.) | decree affirmed |
| Chesapeake and Ohio Railway Company v. Kuhn | 284 U.S. 44 (1931) | McReynolds | 9–0 | none | none | certiorari to the Ohio Supreme Court (Ohio), and to the Court of Appeals of Pike County, Ohio | judgment reversed, and cause remanded |
| Western Pacific California Railroad Company v. Southern Pacific Company | 284 U.S. 47 (1931) | McReynolds | 9–0 | none | none | certiorari to the United States Court of Appeals for the Ninth Circuit (9th Cir.) | judgment reversed |
| Permutit Company v. Graver Corporation | 284 U.S. 52 (1931) | Brandeis | 9–0 | none | none | certiorari to the United States Court of Appeals for the Seventh Circuit (7th Cir.) | judgment affirmed |
| De Laval Steam Turbine Company v. United States | 284 U.S. 61 (1931) | Sutherland | 9–0 | none | none | certiorari to the United States Court of Claims (Ct. Cl.) | judgment affirmed |
| Chicago and North Western Railway Company v. Bolle | 284 U.S. 74 (1931) | Sutherland | 9–0 | none | none | certiorari to the Appellate Court of Illinois (App. Ct. Ill.) | judgment reversed |
| Chicago, Rock Island and Pacific Railway Company v. United States | 284 U.S. 80 (1931) | Sutherland | 6–3 | none | Stone (opinion; joined by Holmes and Brandeis) | appeal from the United States District Court for the Northern District of Illinois (N.D. Ill.) | decree reversed |
| Louisiana Public Service Commission v. Texas and New Orleans Railroad Company | 284 U.S. 125 (1931) | Butler | 9–0 | none | none | appeals from the United States District Court for the Eastern District of Louisiana (E.D. La.) | decrees affirmed |
| Handy and Harman v. Burnet, Commissioner of Internal Revenue | 284 U.S. 136 (1931) | Butler | 9–0 | none | none | certiorari to the United States Court of Appeals for the Second Circuit (2d Cir.) | judgment affirmed |
| United States v. Murdock | 284 U.S. 141 (1931) | Butler | 9–0 | none | none | appeal from the United States District Court for the Southern District of Illinois (S.D. Ill.) | judgment reversed |
| Hardware Dealers Mutual Fire Insurance Company v. Glidden Company | 284 U.S. 151 (1931) | Stone | 9–0 | none | none | appeal from the Minnesota Supreme Court (Minn.) | judgment affirmed |
| Phillips, Collector of Internal Revenue v. Dime Trust and Safe Deposit Company | 284 U.S. 160 (1931) | Stone | 9–0 | none | none | certified question from the United States Court of Appeals for the Third Circuit (3d Cir.) | judgment reversed |
| United States v. Ryan | 284 U.S. 167 (1931) | Stone | 9–0 | none | none | certiorari to the United States Court of Appeals for the Ninth Circuit (9th Cir.) | judgment reversed |
| Sun Insurance Office v. Scott | 284 U.S. 177 (1931) | Roberts | 9–0 | none | none | certiorari to the United States Court of Appeals for the Sixth Circuit (6th Cir.) | judgments reversed, and causes remanded |
| Mecom v. Fitzsimmons Drilling Company, Inc. | 284 U.S. 183 (1931) | Roberts | 9–0 | none | none | certiorari to the United States Court of Appeals for the Tenth Circuit (10th Cir.) | judgment reversed, and cause remanded to the United States District Court with directions to set aside the judgment and remand the case to the state court |
| Southern Railroad Company v. Walters | 284 U.S. 190 (1931) | Roberts | 8-0[a] | none | none | certiorari to the United States Court of Appeals for the Eighth Circuit (8th Cir.) | judgment reversed, and cause remanded |
| United States v. Baltimore and Ohio Railroad Company | 284 U.S. 195 (1931) | McReynolds | 6–3 | none | Stone (opinion; with which Holmes and Brandeis concurred) | appeal from the United States District Court for the District of New Jersey (D.N.J.) | decree affirmed |
| Hoeper v. Tax Commission of Wisconsin | 284 U.S. 206 (1931) | Roberts | 6–3 | none | Holmes (opinion; with which Brandeis and Stone concurred) | appeal from the Wisconsin Supreme Court (Wis.) | judgment reversed, and cause remanded |
| Bradford Electric Light Company v. Clapper | 284 U.S. 221 (1931) | Hughes | 9–0 | none | none | appeal from and petition for certiorari to the United States Court of Appeals for the First Circuit (1st Cir.) | appeals dismissed, and writ of certiorari granted |
| Van Huffel v. Harkelrode | 284 U.S. 225 (1931) | Brandeis | 9–0 | none | none | certiorari to the Court of Appeals of Trumbull County, Ohio, and to the Ohio Supreme Court (Ohio) | judgment reversed in one case; certiorari discharged in one case |
| Wilbur, Secretary of the Interior v. United States ex rel. Vindicator Consolidated Gold Mining Company | 284 U.S. 231 (1931) | Butler | 9–0 | none | none | certiorari to the United States Court of Appeals for the District of Columbia (D.C. Cir.) | judgments affirmed |
| Iowa-Des Moines National Bank v. Bennett | 284 U.S. 239 (1931) | Brandeis | 9–0 | none | none | certiorari to the Iowa Supreme Court (Iowa) | judgment reversed |
| Atchison, Topeka and Santa Fe Railroad Company v. United States | 284 U.S. 248 (1932) | Hughes | 9–0 | none | none | appeal from the United States District Court for the Northern District of Illinois (N.D. Ill.) | order of the District Court refusing an interlocutory injunction reversed, and cause remanded with direction to grant the injunction as prayed |
| Marine Transit Corporation v. Dreyfus | 284 U.S. 263 (1932) | Hughes | 9–0 | none | none | certiorari to the United States Court of Appeals for the Second Circuit (2d Cir.) | decree affirmed |
| United States ex rel. Polymeris v. Trudell, Immigration Inspector | 284 U.S. 279 (1932) | Holmes | 9–0 | none | none | certiorari to the United States Court of Appeals for the Second Circuit (2d Cir.) | judgment affirmed |
| Lewis v. Reynolds, Collector of Internal Revenue | 284 U.S. 281 (1932) | McReynolds | 9–0 | none | none | certiorari to the United States Court of Appeals for the Tenth Circuit (10th Cir.) | judgment affirmed |
| Denver and Rio Grande Western Railroad Company v. Terte | 284 U.S. 284 (1932) | McReynolds | 8-0[a] | none | none | certiorari to the Missouri Supreme Court (Mo.) | judgment reversed, and cause remanded |
| Atlantic Coast Line Railroad Company v. United States | 284 U.S. 288 (1932) | Brandeis | 9–0 | none | none | appeal from the United States District Court for the Western District of South Carolina (W.D.S.C.) | judgment affirmed |
| Chicago and Eastern Illinois Railroad Company v. Industrial Commission of Illinois | 284 U.S. 296 (1932) | Sutherland | 9–0 | none | none | certiorari to the Circuit Court of Cook County (Cir. Ct. Cook Cnty.) | judgment affirmed |
| Blockburger v. United States | 284 U.S. 299 (1932) | Sutherland | 9–0 | none | none | certiorari to the United States Court of Appeals for the Seventh Circuit (7th Cir.) | judgment affirmed |
| Denton v. Yazoo and Mississippi Valley Railroad Company | 284 U.S. 305 (1932) | Sutherland | 9–0 | none | none | certiorari to the Mississippi Supreme Court (Miss.) | judgment affirmed |
| First National Bank of Boston v. Maine | 284 U.S. 312 (1932) | Sutherland | 6–3 | none | Stone (opinion; with which Holmes and Brandeis concurred) | appeal from the Maine Supreme Judicial Court (Me.) | judgment reversed, and cause remanded |
| Hodge Drive-It-Yourself Company v. City of Cincinnati | 284 U.S. 335 (1932) | Butler | 9–0 | none | none | appeal from the Ohio Supreme Court (Ohio) | judgment affirmed |
| Southern Railroad Company v. Kentucky | 284 U.S. 338 (1932) | Butler | 8-0[a] | none | none | appeals from the Kentucky Court of Appeals (Ky.) | judgment affirmed |
| American Hide and Leather Company v. United States | 284 U.S. 343 (1932) | Stone | 9–0 | none | none | certiorari to the United States Court of Claims (Ct. Cl.) | judgment reversed |
| Matson Navigation Company v. United States | 284 U.S. 352 (1932) | Stone | 9–0 | none | none | certiorari to the United States Court of Claims (Ct. Cl.) | judgment affirmed |
| Transit Commission v. United States | 284 U.S. 360 (1932) | Roberts | 9–0 | none | none | appeal from the United States District Court for the Southern District of New York (S.D.N.Y.) | judgment affirmed |
| Arizona Grocery Company v. Atchison, Topeka and Santa Fe Railroad Company | 284 U.S. 370 (1932) | Roberts | 7–2 | none | Holmes and Brandeis (joint short statement) | certiorari to the United States Court of Appeals for the Ninth Circuit (9th Cir.) | judgment affirmed |
| Dunn v. United States | 284 U.S. 390 (1932) | Holmes | 8–1 | none | Butler (opinion) | certiorari to the United States Court of Appeals for the Ninth Circuit (9th Cir.) | judgment affirmed |
| Baltimore and Philadelphia Steamboat Company v. Norton | 284 U.S. 408 (1932) | Butler | 9–0 | none | none | certiorari to the United States Court of Appeals for the Third Circuit (3d Cir.) | judgment affirmed as modified |
| New York, New Haven and Hartford Railroad Company v. Bezue | 284 U.S. 415 (1932) | Roberts | 9–0 | none | none | certiorari to the New York Supreme Court (N.Y. Sup. Ct.) | judgment reversed, and cause remanded |
| Blackmer v. United States | 284 U.S. 421 (1932) | Hughes | 8-0[b] | none | none | certiorari to the United States Court of Appeals for the District of Columbia (D.C. Cir.) | decrees affirmed |
| Henkel v. Chicago, St. Paul, Minneapolis and Omaha Railway Company | 284 U.S. 444 (1932) | Hughes | 9–0 | none | none | certified question from the United States Court of Appeals for the Eighth Circuit (8th Cir.) | certified question answered |
| Leman v. Krentler-Arnold Hinge Last Company | 284 U.S. 448 (1932) | Hughes | 8–1 | none | McReynolds (short statement) | certiorari to the United States Court of Appeals for the First Circuit (1st Cir.) | judgment reversed in one case; judgment affirmed in one case |
| Atchison, Topeka and Santa Fe Railroad Company v. Saxon | 284 U.S. 458 (1932) | McReynolds | 9–0 | none | none | certiorari to the Texas Supreme Court (Tex.) | judgment below reversed, and cause remanded |
| Missouri Pacific Railroad Company v. David | 284 U.S. 460 (1932) | McReynolds | 9–0 | none | none | certiorari to the Missouri Supreme Court (Mo.) | judgment below reversed, and cause remanded |
| Central Pacific Railroad Company v. Alameda County | 284 U.S. 463 (1932) | Sutherland | 9–0 | none | none | certiorari to the California Supreme Court (Cal.) | decree affirmed |
| United States Navigation Company v. Cunard Steamship Company | 284 U.S. 474 (1932) | Sutherland | 9–0 | none | none | certiorari to the United States Court of Appeals for the Second Circuit (2d Cir.) | decree affirmed |
| Bergholm v. Peoria Life Insurance Company | 284 U.S. 489 (1932) | Sutherland | 9–0 | none | none | certiorari to the United States Court of Appeals for the Fifth Circuit (5th Cir.) | judgment affirmed |
| Singleton v. Cheek | 284 U.S. 493 (1932) | Sutherland | 9–0 | none | none | certiorari to the Oklahoma Supreme Court (Okla.) | judgment reversed |
| Miller, Collector of Internal Revenue v. Standard Nut Margarine Company of Florida | 284 U.S. 498 (1932) | Butler | 7–2 | none | Stone (opinion; joined by Brandeis) | certiorari to the United States Court of Appeals for the Fifth Circuit (5th Cir.) | decrees affirmed |
| United States Cartridge Company v. United States | 284 U.S. 511 (1932) | Butler | 9–0 | none | none | certiorari to the United States Court of Claims (Ct. Cl.) | judgment reversed |
| Matthews v. Rodgers | 284 U.S. 521 (1932) | Stone | 9–0 | none | none | appeal from the United States District Court for the Northern District of Mississippi (N.D. Miss.) | judgment reversed |
| Stratton, Secretary of State of Illinois v. St. Louis Southwestern Railroad Company | 284 U.S. 530 (1932) | Stone | 9–0 | none | none | appeal from the United States District Court for the Southern District of Illinois (S.D. Ill.) | judgment reversed |
| Utah v. United States | 284 U.S. 534 (1932) | Stone | 9–0 | none | none | certiorari to the United States Court of Appeals for the Tenth Circuit (10th Cir.) | decree affirmed |
| Realty Acceptance Corporation v. Montgomery | 284 U.S. 547 (1932) | Roberts | 8-0[a] | none | none | certiorari to the United States Court of Appeals for the Third Circuit (3d Cir.) | order affirmed |
| Old Colony Railroad Company v. Commissioner of Internal Revenue | 284 U.S. 552 (1932) | Roberts | 9–0 | none | none | certiorari to the United States Court of Appeals for the First Circuit (1st Cir.) | judgment reversed |
| American Surety Company of New York v. Greek Catholic Union | 284 U.S. 563 (1932) | Roberts | 8–1 | none | McReynolds (without opinion) | certiorari to the United States Court of Appeals for the Third Circuit (3d Cir.) | judgment reversed |

[a] Stone took no part in the case
[b] Roberts took no part in the case
