= Blackmer v. United States =

- Supreme Court of the United States

Argued January 5, 1932 Decided February 15, 1932
- Full case name: Blackmer v. United States
- Citations: 284 U.S. 421 (more) 52 S. Ct. 252; 76 L. Ed. 375; 1932 U.S. LEXIS 882

Holding
- International law recognized a state's right to retain jurisdiction over its citizens abroad. Fines against Blackmer upheld.

Court membership
- Chief Justice Charles E. Hughes Associate Justices Willis Van Devanter · James C. McReynolds; Louis Brandeis · George Sutherland; Pierce Butler · Harlan F. Stone; Owen Roberts

Case opinion
- Majority: Hughes, joined by Van Devanter, McReynolds, Brandeis, Sutherland, Butler, Stone
- Roberts took no part in the consideration or decision of the case.

Blackmer v. United States, 284 U.S. 421 (1932), is a decision of the Supreme Court of the United States. Harry M. Blackmer was a United States citizen resident in Paris. Blackmer was found guilty of contempt by the Supreme Court of the District of Columbia for refusing to appear as a witness for the United States in a criminal trial, which was related to the Teapot Dome scandal, after being subpoenaed.

Blackmer was subsequently fined $30,000 and the costs of the court. Blackmer challenged the fine under the due process clause of the Fifth Amendment.

The Court unanimously ruled against Blackmer, with Chief Justice Charles Evans Hughes delivering the judgment and opinion of the Court and Justice Owen Josephus Roberts not participating.

Chief Justice Hughes, in delivering the opinion of the Court, stated "[n]or can it be doubted that the United States possesses the power inherent in sovereignty to require the return to this country of a citizen, resident elsewhere, whenever the public interest requires it, and to penalize him in case of refusal." Also, "[i]t is also beyond controversy that one of the duties which the citizen owes to his government is to support the administration of justice by attending its courts and giving his testimony whenever he is properly summoned."

== See also ==
- List of United States Supreme Court cases, volume 284
