= Union Pacific Railroad Co. v. Brotherhood of Locomotive Engineers =

- Supreme Court of the United States

Argued October 7, 2009 Decided December 8, 2009
- Full case name: Union Pacific Railroad Company v. Brotherhood of Locomotive Engineers and Trainmen General Committee of Adjustment, Central Region
- Docket no.: 08-604
- Citations: 558 U.S. 67 (more) 130 S. Ct. 584; 175 L. Ed. 2d 428
- Argument: Oral argument
- Opinion announcement: Opinion announcement

Holding
- Given that nothing in the Railway Labor Act elevates to jurisdictional status the obligation to conference minor disputes or to prove conferencing, it is incorrect to treat the limited statutory grounds for relief in the act as a constitutional due process issue.

Court membership
- Chief Justice John Roberts Associate Justices John P. Stevens · Antonin Scalia; Anthony Kennedy · Clarence Thomas; Ruth Bader Ginsburg · Stephen Breyer; Samuel Alito · Sonia Sotomayor

Case opinion
- Majority: Ginsburg, joined by unanimous

Laws applied
- Railway Labor Act

Union Pacific Railroad v. Brotherhood of Locomotive Engineers, 558 U.S. 67 (2009), was a United States Supreme Court in which the court held that, given that nothing in the Railway Labor Act elevates to jurisdictional status the obligation to conference minor disputes or to prove conferencing, it is incorrect to treat the limited statutory grounds for relief in the act as a constitutional due process issue. The court agreed with the court below that the case needed to be dismissed because the statute created a jurisdictional issue, but it disagreed with the court's disposition of the issue with constitutional due process considerations rather than what was written in the statute.

== Background ==
The Railway Labor Act was created to enable peaceful resolution of labor disputes between Railroad Companies and their Unions. For disputes deemed minor a panel of five would meet; two from the railroad industry, two from the unions and one neutral party under the National Labor Relations Board (NLRB). In order to reach arbitration the two parties had to exhaust their grievance procedures under their own Collective Bargaining Agreements (CBA). If this fails then either party may refer the issue to the NLRB with full statements of facts that these negotiations took place.

Union Pacific Railroad Company issued disciplinary violations against five of its employees represented by the Brotherhood of Locomotive Engineers and Trainmen (BLET), a division of the Teamsters. The union then initiated grievance proceedings under their CBA. Dissatisfied with the outcome, the Union appealed to the NLRB Board. In opening proceedings one of the industry representatives objected that there was no evidence in the filing that the two parties had conferenced under their CBA.

The NRAB dismissed their petition for lack of required evidence. It also denied the BLET the right to add proof of conferencing to the complaint because as an appellate body it is not permitted to receive new evidence.

The District Court for the Northern District of Illinois affirmed the decision of the NRAB where it was appealed to the Court of Appeals for the Seventh Circuit. The Appellate Court decided that the singular question at issue was whether written documentation of CBA arbitration was a required perquisite to NLRB arbitration. The court determined there was no such requirement in any rules or regulations of the NLRB and had acted outside the will and intent of the Congress. However the Seventh Circuit did not invoke only statutory grounds for rejection of the NLRB but ruled that the NLRB proceedings had violated the Union's due process.

== Decision of the Court ==
The Court ruled unanimously with Justice Ginsburg writing the opinion. The Court agreed with the outcome of the Seventh Circuit but not its reasoning. Ginsburg wrote that the Appeals Court had incorrectly applied a constitutional remedy instead of purely a statutory one, the court affirmed the Seventh Circuit ruling on statutory grounds and ruling that the NLRB had not denied due process but had merely "failed to conform or confine itself to the jurisdiction Congress gave it."

== See also ==
- Union Pacific R. Co. v. Cheyenne (1885)
- Kansas Pacific R. Co. v. Dunmeyer (1885)
- Union Pacific Railway Company v. Botsford (1891)
- Brushaber v. Union Pacific Railroad (1916)
