= Revenue Act of 1913 =

US tax law

- Long title: An Act to reduce tariff duties and to provide revenue for the Government, and for other purposes.
- Enacted by: the 63rd United States Congress
- Effective: October 4, 1913

Citations
- Statutes at Large: 38 Stat. 114

Legislative history
- Committee consideration by House Ways and Means, Senate Finance; Passed the House on May 8, 1913 (255–104); Passed the Senate on September 9, 1913 (44–37); Signed into law by President Woodrow Wilson on October 3, 1913

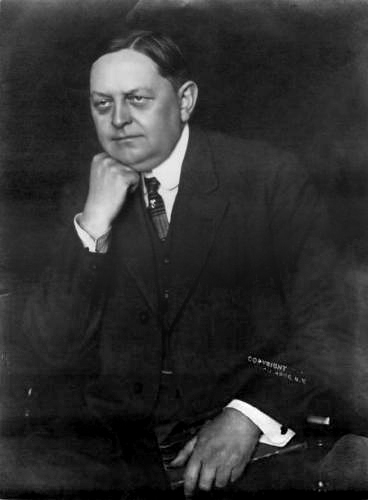
Oscar Underwood

The Revenue Act of 1913, also known as the T1913, Underwood Tariff or the Underwood–Simmons Act (ch. 16, 38 Stat. 114), re-established a federal income tax in the United States and substantially lowered tariff rates. The act was sponsored by Representative Oscar Underwood, passed by the 63rd United States Congress, and signed into law by President Woodrow Wilson.

Wilson and other members of the Democratic Party had long seen high tariffs as equivalent to unfair taxes on consumers, and tariff reduction was President Wilson's first priority upon taking office. Following the ratification of the Sixteenth Amendment in 1913, Democratic leaders agreed to seek passage of a major bill that would dramatically lower tariffs and implement an income tax. Underwood quickly shepherded the revenue bill through the House of Representatives, but the bill won approval in the United States Senate only after extensive lobbying by the Wilson administration. Wilson signed the bill into law on October 3, 1913.

The Revenue Act of 1913 lowered average tariff rates from 40 percent to 26 percent. It also established a one percent tax on income above $3,000 per year; the tax affected approximately three percent of the population. A separate provision established a corporate tax of one percent, superseding a previous tax that had only applied to corporations with net incomes greater than $5,000 per year. Though a Republican-controlled Congress would later raise tariff rates, the Revenue Act of 1913 marked an important shift in federal revenue policy, as government revenue would increasingly rely on income taxes rather than tariff duties.

== Passage ==
Democrats had long seen high tariff rates as equivalent to unfair taxes on consumers, and tariff reduction was President Wilson's first priority upon taking office. He argued that the system of high tariffs "cuts us off from our proper part in the commerce of the world, violates the just principles of taxation, and makes the government a facile instrument in the hands of private interests." While most Democrats were united behind a decrease in tariff rates, most Republicans held that high tariff rates were useful for protecting domestic manufacturing and factory workers against foreign competition. Shortly before Wilson took office, the Sixteenth Amendment, which had been proposed by Congress in 1909 during a debate over tariff legislation, was ratified by the requisite number of states. Following the ratification of the Sixteenth Amendment, Democratic leaders agreed to attach an income tax provision to their tariff reduction bill, partly to make up for lost revenue, and partly to shift the burden of funding the government towards the high earners that would be subject to the income tax.

By late May 1913, House Majority Leader Oscar Underwood had passed a bill in the House that cut the average tariff rate by 10 percent. Underwood's bill, which represented the largest downward revision of the tariff since the Civil War, aggressively cut rates for raw materials, goods deemed to be "necessities," and products produced domestically by trusts, but it retained higher tariff rates for luxury goods. The bill also instituted a tax on personal income above $4,000. Passage of Underwood's tariff bill in the Senate would prove more difficult than in the House, partially because some Southern and Western Democrats favored the continued protection of the wool and sugar industries, and partially because Democrats had a narrower majority in that chamber. Seeking to marshal support for the tariff bill, Wilson met extensively with Democratic senators and appealed directly to the people through the press. After weeks of hearings and debate, Wilson and Secretary of State William Jennings Bryan managed to unite Senate Democrats behind the bill. The Senate voted 44 to 37 in favor of the bill, with only one Democrat voting against it and only one Republican, progressive leader Robert M. La Follette, voting for it. Wilson signed the Revenue Act of 1913 into law on October 3, 1913.

== Provisions ==
=== Tariffs ===
Puck political cartoon drawn by Udo Keppler depicting Woodrow Wilson as a victorious pharaoh with monopoly, the Republicans, and Progressives in chains. Oscar Underwood and F. M. Simmons are leading an army of congressmen in support.

The Revenue Act of 1913 reduced the average import tariff rates from approximately 40 percent to approximately 25 percent.

The Act established the lowest rates since the Walker Tariff of 1857. Most schedules were ad valorem basis, a percentage of the value of the item.

The duty on woolens went from 56% to 18.5%. Steel rails, raw wool, iron ore, and agricultural implements now had zero rates. The reciprocity program wanted by the Republicans was eliminated. Congress rejected proposals for a tariff board to fix rates scientifically, but it set up a study commission.

The Underwood-Simmons measure vastly increased the free list, adding woolens, iron, steel, farm machinery, and many raw materials and foodstuffs. The average rate was approximately 26%.

The example set several years prior by special legislation exempting Gate of Heaven Church in South Boston from paying a duty on stained glass windows led to stained glass windows being exempt from all duties for all houses of worship.

=== Income tax ===
The Revenue Act of 1913 restored a federal income tax for the first time since 1872. The federal government had also adopted an income tax in the Wilson–Gorman Tariff Act, but that tax had been struck down by the Supreme Court in the case of Pollock v. Farmers' Loan & Trust Co. The Revenue Act of 1913 imposed a one percent tax on incomes above $3,000, with a top tax rate of six percent on those earning more than $500,000 per year. Approximately three percent of the population was subject to the income tax. The bill also included a one percent tax on the net income of all corporations, superseding a previous federal tax that had only applied to corporate net incomes above $5,000. The Supreme Court upheld the constitutionality of the income tax in the cases of Brushaber v. Union Pacific Railroad Co. and Stanton v. Baltic Mining Co.

=== Income tax table for individuals ===
A normal income tax and an additional tax were levied against the net income of individuals, as shown in the following table:

Revenue Act of 1913; Normal income tax and additional tax on individuals 38 Stat. 166
Income	Normal rate	Additional rate	Combined rate
0	1%	0	1%
$20,000	1%	1%	2%
$50,000	1%	2%	3%
$75,000	1%	3%	4%
$100,000	1%	4%	5%
$250,000	1%	5%	6%
$500,000	1%	6%	7%

There was an exemption of $3,000 for single filers and $4,000 for married couples. Therefore, the 1% bottom marginal rate applied only to the first $17,000 ($374,400 in 2010 dollars) of income for single filers or the first $16,000 ($352,300 in 2010 dollars) of income for married filers (see also below the adjustments for inflation between 1913 and 2010 in the BLS table).

The ratio of top marginal rate to bottom marginal rate in 1913 was 7:1 (7%:1%). The last time a similar ratio was applicable was in 1980, when the ratio of the top rate to the bottom rate was 6.36:1 (70%:11%). In 1981, the top rate was reduced to 50%, and in 1986, it was reduced to 28% (the bottom rate rose from 11% to 15%). The 1986 change dramatically altered the ratio, from 6.36:1 to 1.87:1 (28%:15%). Today, the ratio is 3.7:1 (37%:10%).

=== Adjusted for inflation ===
Here are the rates adjusted for inflation by the average Consumer Price Index:

1913 dollars	Inflation	2010 dollars	Exempt – 1913	Exempt – 2010
$3,000	2,200%	$66,100	Single filers $3,000	Single filers $9,350 or 14.1%
$4,000	2,200%	$88,100*	Married filers $4,000	Married filers $18,700 or 21.2%
$20,000	2,200%	$440,400		
$50,000	2,200%	$1,101,000		
$75,000	2,200%	$1,651,600		
$100,000	2,200%	$2,202,100		
$250,000	2,200%	$5,505,300		
$500,000	2,200%	$11,010,700		

All figures are rounded.

In 2010 dollars, the 2010 personal exemption ($3,650) and the standard deduction ($5,700) for single filers were together $9,350, only 14.1% of the 1913 exemption of $66,100 in 2010 dollars ($9,350/$66,100).

In 2010 dollars, the 2010 personal exemptions ($7,300) and the standard deduction ($11,400) for married couples filing jointly were together $18,700, only 21.2% of the 1913 exemption of $88,100 in 2010 dollars ($18,700/$88,100).

== Impact and aftermath ==
Working with progressive Republicans, Congressional Democrats won passage of the Revenue Act of 1916, which reinstated the federal estate tax, established a tax on the production of munitions, raised the top income tax rate to fifteen percent, and raised the corporate income tax from one percent to two percent. That same year, Wilson signed a law that established the Tariff Commission, which was charged with providing expert advice on tariff rates.

There was an impact for the Cuban tobacco industry concerning their import to the States. Theodore Garbade, President of the Union of Manufacturers of Cigars of Cuba laid this out to Cuban President Mario G. Menocal.

The Act also created a new group of tax-exempt organizations dedicated to social welfare. The provision was a precursor to what is now Internal Revenue Code Section 501(c)(4).

In the 1920s, Republicans raised tariffs and lowered the income tax. Nonetheless, the policies of the Wilson administration had a durable impact on the composition of government revenue, which after the 1920s would primarily come from income taxation rather than tariffs.

== Sources ==
- Allen, Howard W. (1961). "Geography and Politics: Voting on Reform Issues in the United States Senate, 1911–1916". Journal of Southern History. 27 (2): 216–228. doi:10.2307/2205279. JSTOR 2205279.
- Clements, Kendrick A. (1992). The Presidency of Woodrow Wilson. University Press of Kansas. ISBN 978-0-7006-0523-1.
- Cole, Arthur H. (1921). "The Domestic and Foreign Wool Manufactures and the Tariff Problem". Quarterly Journal of Economics. 36 (1): 102–135. doi:10.2307/1883781. JSTOR 1883781.
- Cooper, John Milton. Woodrow Wilson: A Biography (2009)
- Crucini, Mario J. (1994). "Sources of Variation in Real Tariff Rates: The United States, 1900–1940". American Economic Review. 84 (3): 732–743. JSTOR 2118081.
- Gould, Lewis L. (2003). Grand Old Party: A History of the Republicans. Random House. ISBN 978-0-375-50741-0.
- Hoffmann, I. Newton (1914). "Customs Administration under the 1913 Tariff Act". Journal of Political Economy. 22 (9): 845–871. doi:10.1086/252537. JSTOR 1817810. S2CID 154816062.
- Link, Arthur (1968). Woodrow Wilson: vol 2, The New Freedom. New York, Hill and Wang. ISBN 9780809002054.
- Weisman, Steven R. (2002). The Great Tax Wars: Lincoln to Wilson – The Fierce Battles over Money That Transformed the Nation. Simon & Schuster. ISBN 978-0-684-85068-9.
