= United States v. Kirby Lumber Co. =

- Supreme Court of the United States

Argued October 21, 1931 Decided November 2, 1931
- Full case name: United States v. Kirby Lumber Company
- Citations: 284 U.S. 1 (more) 52 S. Ct. 4; 76 L. Ed. 131; 1931 U.S. LEXIS 457; 2 U.S. Tax Cas. (CCH) ¶ 814; 10 A.F.T.R. (P-H) 458

Case history
- Prior: Kirby Lumber Co. v. United States, 44 F.2d 885 (Ct. Cl. 1930); Cert. granted, 283 U.S. 814 (1931).

Holding
- If a corporation purchases and retires bonds at a price less than their face value or issuing price, the excess amount of the purchase price over the issuing price is a taxable gain.

Court membership
- Chief Justice Charles E. Hughes Associate Justices Oliver W. Holmes Jr. · Willis Van Devanter; James C. McReynolds · Louis Brandeis; George Sutherland · Pierce Butler; Harlan F. Stone · Owen Roberts

Case opinion
- Majority: Holmes, joined by unanimous

Laws applied
- § 213 of the Revenue Act of 1921

United States v. Kirby Lumber Co., 284 U.S. 1 (1931), was a case in which the United States Supreme Court held that when a corporation settles its debts for less than the face amount, a taxable gain has occurred.

== Facts & procedural history ==
In 1923, the Kirby Lumber Company issued bonds which had a par value of $12,126,800. Later that same year, the company repurchased the same bonds in the open market for a sum less than par value. The difference between the issue price of the bonds and the price at which the company repurchased them was $137,521.30. The regulations promulgated by the United States Department of the Treasury stated that such a cost savings to a corporation was to be considered taxable income. The Court of Claims, however, found in favor of the taxpayer, analogizing the situation in this case to the one in Bowers v. Kerbaugh-Empire Co., 271 U.S. 170 (1925), a case in which a loan repaid in devalued German marks was not considered to be a taxable gain for the taxpaying company.

== Decision ==
In a brief unanimous opinion, Justice Holmes upheld the validity of the Treasury regulations. He distinguished Bowers v. Kerbaugh-Empire Co. on the grounds that the enterprise in that case had been on the whole a failure, and had lost money. In this case, the taxpayer had made a clear and obvious gain. By paying off its debts for less than the issue price, it had freed up assets to spend on other things. Justice Holmes said nothing about the Treasury's definition of income in his opinion. Later cases before the Court did however address directly the Treasury's definition in connection with related cases.

== See also ==
- List of United States Supreme Court cases, volume 284
