= Union Pacific Railway Co. v. Cheyenne =

Union Pacific R. Co. v. Cheyenne
- Supreme Court of the United States

Argued November 18 – November 19, 1884 Decided March 2, 1885
- Full case name: Union Pacific Railway Company v. Cheyenne
- Citations: 113 U.S. 516 (more) 5 S. Ct. 601; 28 L. Ed. 1098

Court membership
- Chief Justice Morrison Waite Associate Justices Samuel F. Miller · Stephen J. Field; Joseph P. Bradley · John M. Harlan; William B. Woods · Stanley Matthews; Horace Gray · Samuel Blatchford

Case opinion
- Majority: Bradley, joined by unanimous

Union Pacific Railway Co. v. Cheyenne, 113 U.S. 516 (1885), was an appeal from the Supreme Court of the Territory of Wyoming regarding a bill charging that the collection of an illegal tax would involve the plaintiff in a multiplicity of suits as to the title of lots being laid out and sold, which would prevent their sale, and which would cloud the title to all his real estate, states a case for relief in equity.

== Background ==
An Act of the Legislature of Wyoming, passed December 13, 1879, required the state auditor to furnish to the territorial board of equalization a list for assessment and taxation of the roadbed, superstructure, and other enumerated property of every railroad and telegraph company in the territory when any portion of the property of such company was situated in more than one county, and required the board to value and assess the property of the corporation for each mile of its road or line, and to certify to the county clerks of the counties in which the property was situated the assessment per mile, specifying the number of miles and amount in each of the counties, and which required the county commissioners to decide and adjust the number of miles and amounts within each precinct, township, or school district within their respective counties and cause such amounts to be entered on the lists of taxable property returned by the assessors, withdrew the duty of assessing fractional parts of such railroad and the property of such companies from all local assessors in the territory, including its incorporated cities.

A statute which provides a general scheme for assessing and taxing the property of railroad and telegraph companies as a whole and for distributing it ratably among the different counties and their several precincts, townships and districts according to the number of miles of line in each repeals, as to such property, a power conferred upon the authorities of a city to make provisions for the assessment of the taxes which they were authorized by other provisions of the city charter to assess and collect.

The bill in this case was filed by the Union Pacific Railway Company against the City of Cheyenne and its marshal, Ryan, to enjoin the collection of certain city taxes for the year 1880, which the railway company alleges were unlawfully assessed against it. The bill was demurred to by the defendants, and the District Court for the First Judicial District of Wyoming, in which the suit was brought, overruled the demurrer, and granted the injunction prayed for. The defendants adhered to their demurrer and appealed to the supreme court of the territory, and the decree of the district court was reversed and the bill ordered to be dismissed, and the case is now brought here by appeal.

== Question on certiorari ==
The main question raised by the bill is whether the Union Pacific Railroad, which passes through the whole length of Wyoming Territory, and in its course passes through the City of Cheyenne, with its accompanying telegraph, appurtenances, and rolling stock, is liable to be assessed and valued for the purposes of taxation in Cheyenne by the city authorities, or only by the territorial board of equalization.

== Opinion of the Court ==
The high court found that the allegations of the bill in this case bring it fairly within the jurisdiction of the court. It showed that it would involve the plaintiff in a multiplicity of suits as to title of lots laid out and being sold; would prevent their sale, and would cloud the title to all its real estate. We think that these results are sufficiently apparent, and render it unnecessary to look further. The allegation of fraud has not been proven, and cannot therefore have any effect in the case. It is unnecessary to inquire into the sufficiency of other grounds for equitable relief which are alleged in the bill.

Another point raised by the defendants, not affecting the jurisdiction of the court but the propriety of its taking jurisdiction, is that the complainant ought to have paid the taxes which are conceded to be due to the city for the year 1880. As the court understood the facts stated by the bill (which, of course, the demurrer admits to be true), the complainant did pay to the city all the taxes which would be due upon the assessment and valuation made by the board of equalization, including taxes due on outside property of the company in the city.

The court found that the decree of the Supreme Court of Wyoming should be reversed and the cause remanded with instructions to enter a decree in favor of the complainant in conformity with this opinion, and it was so ordered.

== See also ==
- Kansas Pacific R. Co. v. Dunmeyer (1885)
- Union Pacific Railway Company v. Botsford (1891)
- Brushaber v. Union Pacific Railroad (1916)
- Union Pacific Railroad v. Brotherhood of Locomotive Engineers (2009)
- List of United States Supreme Court cases, volume 113
