= Brushaber v. Union Pacific Railroad Co. =

Brushaber v. Union Pacific Railroad
- Supreme Court of the United States

Argued October 14–15, 1915 Decided January 24, 1916
- Full case name: Frank R. Brushaber v. Union Pacific Railroad Company
- Citations: 240 U.S. 1 (more) 36 S. Ct. 236; 60 L. Ed. 493; 1916 U.S. LEXIS 1418; 1 U.S. Tax Cas. (CCH) ¶ 4;3 A.F.T.R. (P-H) 2926

Case history
- Prior: Dismissed by the District Court for the Southern District of New York
- Subsequent: None

Holding
- (1) The Sixteenth Amendment removes the requirement that income taxes (whether considered to be direct taxes or indirect taxes) be apportioned among the states according to population (Article I, section 9, clause 4 of the US Constitution); (2) the Federal income tax statute does not violate the Fifth Amendment's prohibition against the government taking property without due process of law; (3) the Federal income tax statute does not violate the uniformity clause of Article I, section 8 of the U.S. Constitution.

Court membership
- Chief Justice Edward D. White Associate Justices Joseph McKenna · Oliver W. Holmes Jr. William R. Day · Charles E. Hughes; Willis Van Devanter · Mahlon Pitney; James C. McReynolds

Case opinion
- Majority: White, joined by unanimous
- McReynolds took no part in the consideration or decision of the case.

Laws applied
- U.S. Const. amend. XVI

Brushaber v. Union Pacific Railroad Co., 240 U.S. 1 (1916), was a landmark United States Supreme Court case in which the Court upheld the validity of a tax statute called the Revenue Act of 1913, also known as the Tariff Act, Ch. 16, 38 Stat. 166 (October 3, 1913), enacted pursuant to Article I, section 8, clause 1 of, and the Sixteenth Amendment to, the United States Constitution, which did not confer any new powers of taxation. The case clarified that federal income tax is an excise (privilege) tax. "The income [commonly-defined] is not the subject of the tax; it is the basis for determining the amount of tax."

== Background ==
Prior to 1895, all income taxes had been considered indirect taxes (not required to be apportioned among the states according to the population of each state). In the controversial 1895 case of Pollock v. Farmers' Loan & Trust Co., however, the Court had overturned longstanding precedent and ruled that while a tax on income from labor was an excise, or indirect tax (which was not required to be apportioned), a tax on income derived from property such as interest, dividends, or rents was or should be treated as a direct tax.

== Facts in the Brushaber case ==
The plaintiff in this case, Frank R. Brushaber, was a shareholder in the defendant Union Pacific Railroad company. The Sixteenth Amendment had recently been passed, and the U.S. Congress had enacted legislation pursuant to the amendment assessing taxes to the wealthiest of income earners, including the railroad company in this case. Brushaber brought a lawsuit against the railroad company for an injunction to stop the company from paying the tax. Brushaber's contention was that statute enacting the tax violated the Fifth Amendment's prohibition on the government taking property without due process of law and that the statute also violated due process by exempting certain kinds of income. He also argued because the tax was not apportioned among the states according to population, it was unconstitutional. The U.S. government filed a brief supporting the validity of the tax.

== Holdings ==
In an 8–0 decision (Justice James Clark McReynolds did not participate in the decision), the Court held, in an opinion written by Chief Justice Edward Douglass White, that regarding the Sixteenth Amendment "It is clear on the face of this text that it does not purport to confer power to levy income taxes in a generic sense...or to limit and distinguish between one kind of income taxes and another, but that the whole purpose of the Amendment was to relieve all income taxes when imposed from a consideration of the source whence the income was derived." "The Amendment provides that income taxes...shall not be subject to the regulation of apportionment." (Opinion of Justice Edward White). Chief Justice Edward White further stated that "the [Sixteenth] Amendment was drawn for the purpose of doing away for the future with the principle upon which the Pollack Case was decided..." The Revenue Act of 1913, imposing income taxes that are not apportioned among the states according to each state's population, is constitutional. The Court stated: "...there can be no dispute that there was power by virtue of the Amendment during that period to levy the tax, without apportionment, and so far as the limitations of the Constitution in other respects are concerned, the contention is not open...."

The Court also held that the Revenue Act does not violate the Fifth Amendment's prohibition against the government taking property without due process of law. The Court stated: "So far as the due process clause of the 5th Amendment is relied upon [by Mr. Frank Brushaber], it suffices to say that there is no basis for such reliance, since it is equally well settled that such clause is not a limitation upon the taxing power conferred upon Congress by the Constitution...."

The Court further held that the Revenue Act does not violate the uniformity clause of Article I, Section 8 of the U.S. Constitution. The Court stated: "So far as these numerous and minute, not to say in many respects hypercritical, contentions [by Mr. Frank Brushaber] are based upon an assumed violation of the uniformity clause, their want of legal merit is at once apparent, since it is settled that that clause exacts only a geographical uniformity, and there is not a semblance of ground in any of the propositions [by Mr. Brushaber] for assuming that a violation of such uniformity is complained of."

== Discussion ==
In Brushaber the Court noted that even before the Sixteenth Amendment was passed, Congress had authority to tax income. If a particular income tax was a direct tax or was treated as a direct tax in the constitutional sense, that tax could be imposed (after Pollock but before the passage of the Amendment) only by apportionment among the states, according to their census populations.

== Subsequent interpretation ==
Tax law professor Boris Bittker and his co-authors have stated:

As construed by the Supreme Court in the Brushaber case, the power of Congress to tax income derives from Article I, Section 8, Clause 1, of the original Constitution rather than from the Sixteenth Amendment; the latter simply eliminated the requirement (Article I, section 9, clause 4 of the US Constitution) that an income tax, to the extent that it is a direct tax, must be apportioned among the states.

No income tax enacted by the US Congress (either before or after the Sixteenth Amendment) has ever been apportioned among the states by population. All income taxes enacted after the Amendment have been treated as excises (they have been imposed with geographic uniformity but have not been required to be apportioned).

Since the income tax may be imposed on income from whatever source and without regard to any apportionment requirement (by virtue of the wording of the 16th Amendment), an income tax cannot be treated as a direct tax (as income taxes on income from property were so treated in the Pollock case). Essentially, all income taxes after the Sixteenth Amendment are again treated as indirect taxes. Subsequent lower court cases have interpreted the Brushaber decision ("the confusion is not inherent, but rather arises from the conclusion ... this erroneous assumption") and the Sixteenth Amendment as standing for the rule that the Amendment allows a direct tax on "wages, salaries, commissions, etc. without apportionment."

== Geographical uniformity ==
The Court in Brushaber noted that income taxes inherently belonged in the "category" of indirect tax (or excise). The court stated that income taxes are indirect excise taxes by reinforcing the Pollock decision:

As this conclusion but enforced a regulation as to the mode of exercising power under particular circumstances, it did not in any way dispute the all-embracing taxing authority possessed by Congress, including necessarily therein the power to impose income taxes if only they conformed to the constitutional regulations which were applicable to them. Moreover, in addition, the conclusion reached in the Pollock Case did not in any degree involve holding that income taxes generically and necessarily came within the class of direct taxes on property, but, on the contrary, recognized the fact that taxation on income was in its nature an excise...

Indeed, that had been the understanding with respect to all income taxes until the Pollock decision. The Sixteenth Amendment removed the need imposed by the Pollock decision to determine whether an income tax in any particular case was required to be apportioned, as the Congress could again (after 1913) tax income from any source without having to apportion the tax according to population.

== Property taxes and capitations ==
Nothing in the Sixteenth Amendment or in Brushaber (and the other cases interpreting the tax provisions of the U.S. Constitution) changes the general rule that direct taxes are still required to be apportioned among the states by population. For example, if the US Congress were to enact a national property tax (a property tax or other tax by reason of its ownership) or a national capitation (a poll tax or head tax), such taxes would be required to be apportioned.

== See also ==
- Union Pacific R. Co. v. Cheyenne (1885)
- Kansas Pacific R. Co. v. Dunmeyer (1885)
- Union Pacific Railway Company v. Botsford (1891)
- Union Pacific Railroad v. Brotherhood of Locomotive Engineers (2009)
