= Stanton v. Baltic Mining Co. =

- Supreme Court of the United States

Argued October 14–15, 1915 Decided February 21, 1916
- Full case name: Stanton v. Baltic Mining Company
- Citations: 240 U.S. 103 (more) 36 S.Ct. 278; 60 L. Ed. 546, 1916 U.S. LEXIS 1431

Case history
- Prior: Injunction denied (D. Mass.)

Holding
- Despite taxing mining companies' capital to a degree, income taxes are not direct taxes and so need not be apportioned to be valid. Affirmed.

Court membership
- Chief Justice Edward D. White Associate Justices Joseph McKenna · Oliver W. Holmes Jr. William R. Day · Charles E. Hughes; Willis Van Devanter · Mahlon Pitney; James C. McReynolds

Case opinion
- Majority: White, joined by unanimous
- McReynolds took no part in the consideration or decision of the case.

Laws applied
- U.S. Const. Amend. XVI, Revenue Act of 1913

Stanton v. Baltic Mining Co., 240 U.S. 103 (1916), is a United States Supreme Court case.

== Background ==
Plaintiff John R. Stanton brought suit against the Baltic Mining Company, in which he owned stock, to enjoin (prevent) the company from paying income tax imposed under the Revenue Act of 1913.

Stanton argued that because the income tax contained no provision for depletion of a mine's ore, it was a direct tax on the mine's capital. As a direct tax, Stanton argued, it was invalid since it failed to meet the apportionment requirement of Article I, Section 9, and was not covered by the Sixteenth Amendment.

Stanton appealed from the district court's denial of the injunction.

== Opinion of the Court ==
The U.S. Supreme Court noted that the case "was commenced by the appellant [John R. Stanton] as a stockholder of the Baltic Mining Company, the appellee, to enjoin the voluntary payment by the corporation and its officers of the tax assessed against it under the income tax section of the tariff act of October 3, 1913." On a direct appeal from the trial court, the U.S. Supreme Court affirmed the lower court's decision and rejected Stanton's request for a court order to prevent Baltic Mining Company from paying the income tax.

Stanton argued that the tax law was unconstitutional and void under the Fifth Amendment to the United States Constitution since the law denied "to mining companies and their stockholders equal protection of the laws and deprive[d] them of their property without due process of law." The Supreme Court rejected that argument.

Stanton also argued that the Sixteenth Amendment "authorizes only an exceptional direct income tax without apportionment, to which the tax in question does not conform" and that therefore the income tax was "not within the authority of that Amendment." The Court also rejected that argument and upheld the constitutionality of the income tax under the 1913 Revenue Act.
