= South Carolina v. Baker =

- Supreme Court of the United States

Argued December 7, 1987 Decided April 20, 1988
- Full case name: South Carolina v. Baker, Secretary of the Treasury on Exceptions to Report of Special Master
- Citations: 485 U.S. 505 (more) 108 S. Ct. 1355; 99 L. Ed. 2d 592

Holding
- Section 310(b)(1) of the Tax Equity and Fiscal Responsibility Act of 1982 (TEFRA) does not violate the Tenth Amendment to the United States Constitution, nor violates the doctrine of intergovernmental tax immunity by taxing the interest earned on unregistered state bonds.

Court membership
- Chief Justice William Rehnquist Associate Justices William J. Brennan Jr. · Byron White; Thurgood Marshall · Harry Blackmun; John P. Stevens · Sandra Day O'Connor; Antonin Scalia · Anthony Kennedy

Case opinions
- Majority: Brennan, joined by White, Marshall, Blackmun, Stevens; Scalia (except part II)
- Concurrence: Stevens
- Concurrence: Scalia (in part)
- Concurrence: Rehnquist (in judgment)
- Dissent: O'Connor
- Kennedy took no part in the consideration or decision of the case.

Laws applied
- U.S. Const. amend X; Tax Equity and Fiscal Responsibility Act of 1982
- This case overturned a previous ruling or rulings
- Pollock v. Farmers' Loan & Trust Company, 157 U.S. 429 (1895) (in part)

South Carolina v. Baker, 485 U.S. 505 (1988), was a United States Supreme Court case in which the Court ruled that section 310(b)(1) of the Tax Equity and Fiscal Responsibility Act of 1982 (TEFRA) does not violate the Tenth Amendment to the United States Constitution.

== Background ==
TEFRA continued the federal tax exemption for state bond interest as long as the bond is registered, with each seller and buyer being recorded for audit purposes. Anonymous bearer bonds, which often were used in money laundering, were no longer exempt, however. South Carolina sued to have the federal tax advantage restored for all their bonds.

== Decision ==
The US Supreme Court also ruled that a nondiscriminatory federal tax on the interest earned on state bonds does not violate the intergovernmental tax immunity doctrine, which permitted the federal taxation of interest income on bonds issued by state governments in the United States. The Supreme Court stated that the contrary decision of the Court in the case of Pollock v. Farmers' Loan & Trust Co. (1895) had been "effectively overruled by subsequent case law."

== Sources ==
- Trujillo, P. A. (1988). "Municipal Bond Financing after South Carolina v. Baker and the Tax Reform Act of 1986: Can State Sovereignty Reemerge". Tax Lawyer. 42: 147. ISSN 0040-005X.
- Wyatt, Terrence M.; Sparkman, William E. (1988). "The United States Congress Can Tax Interest on State Bonds: South Carolina v. Baker". West's Education Law Reporter. 48 (1): 1–6. ISSN 0744-8716.
