= Kansas Pacific Railway Co. v. Dunmeyer =

Kansas Pacific R. Co. v. Dunmeyer
- Supreme Court of the United States

Argued November 8, 1884 Decided March 2, 1885
- Full case name: Kansas Pacific R. Co. v. Dunmeyer
- Citations: 113 U.S. 629 (more) 5 S. Ct. 566; 28 L. Ed. 1122

Court membership
- Chief Justice Morrison Waite Associate Justices Samuel F. Miller · Stephen J. Field; Joseph P. Bradley · John M. Harlan; William B. Woods · Stanley Matthews; Horace Gray · Samuel Blatchford

Case opinion
- Majority: Miller, joined by unanimous

Kansas Pacific R. Co. v. Dunmeyer, 113 U.S. 629 (1885), was a writ of error to the Supreme Court of Kansas. The action was brought in that court on a covenant of warranty of title to two pieces of land in a deed of conveyance made by the Kansas Pacific Railroad Company to Dunmeyer. The Pacific Railroad Acts generally allowed railroads to sell public land adjacent to their routes as part of a land grant to raise funds but made an exception for land that already had a homestead filed. G. B. Dunmeyer claimed he purchased land that already had an existing claim.

== Background ==
The suit was brought for breach of covenant of warranty of title to a tract of land in Kansas. Plaintiff in error was defendant below. Its title was derived from grants of public land to aid in the construction of a railway to the Pacific. The tract was within the location of the railroad grants, but was excepted from those grants by reason of a homestead entry and possession. Subsequent to this entry and possession, the party so in possession took title from the railroad company, and the homestead entry was cancelled. The alleged paramount adverse title was derived from a land patent from the United States issued on a homestead entry made subsequent to these proceedings. The Supreme Court of Kansas found that there was a breach of the warranty, and rendered judgment accordingly. This writ of error was brought to review that judgment.

The land was sold by the company to George W. Miller, to whom a certificate of sale was given, which afterwards was assigned to Lewis Dunmeyer, to whom the company made a deed purporting to convey a good title. On this covenant for good title Dunmeyer brought the present action, alleging that the railroad company never had any title, and that the covenant was therefore broken. On this issue the case was tried. Several other defenses were set up, among them that the covenant was not broken, because Dunmeyer was in possession when he bought the certificate issued to Miller and when he took his deed, and has never been disturbed or ousted; that Miller was in possession when he bought of the company and transferred possession to Dunmeyer, and that this has been held ever since, and that Miller's purchase was a compromise of disputed rights, and he and Dunmeyer are therefore estopped to maintain this action. But these and perhaps other points, decided against plaintiff in error, do not present questions of federal law which this Court can review in a judgment of a state court.

The record shows that on July 25, 1866, Miller made a homestead entry on this land which was in every respect valid if the land was then public land subject to such entry. It also shows that the line of definite location of the company's road was first filed with the Commissioner of the United States General Land Office at Washington, September 21, 1866. This entry of Miller's therefore brought the land within the language of the exception in the grant as land to which a homestead claim had attached at the time the line of said road was definitely fixed. For we are of opinion that under this grant, as under many other grants containing the same words or words to the same purport, the act which fixes the time of definite location is the act of filing the map or plat of this line in the office of the commissioner of the General Land Office.

== Decision ==
Of two arguments made, the stronger is in regards that while the company did not file its line of definite location until about two months after Miller made his homestead entry, it did designate the general route of said road, and file a map thereof in the General Land Office July 11 of the same year, 1866, which was fifteen days before Miller's homestead entry. This latter map was filed in the office of the register and receiver on 26 July, one day after Miller made his entry.

It is argued that until this was done, Miller's right of entry remained unaffected. But the court was of opinion that the duty of filing this map, as required by the act, like that of the line of definite location, is performed by filing it in the General Land Office, which is filing it with the Secretary of the Interior, and that whatever rights accrue to the company from the act of filing it accrue from filing it there.

In this case before the high court, a claim was made and filed in the land office, and there recognized, before the line of the company's road was located. That claim was an existing one of public record in favor of Miller when the map of plaintiff in error was filed. In the language of the act of Congress, this homestead claim had attached to the land, and it therefore did not pass by the grant.

Of all the words in the English language, this word "attached' was probably the best that could have been used. It did not mean mere settlement, residence, or cultivation of the land, but it meant a proceeding in the proper land office, by which the inchoate right to the land was initiated. It meant that by such a proceeding, a right of homestead had fastened to that land which could ripen into a perfect title by future residence and cultivation. With the performance of these conditions the company had nothing to do. The right of the homestead having attached to the land, it was excepted out of the grant as much as if, in a deed, it had been excluded from the conveyance by metes and bounds.

The judgment of the Supreme Court of the State of Kansas was affirmed.

== See also ==
- Union Pacific R. Co. v. Cheyenne (1885)
- Union Pacific Railway Company v. Botsford (1891)
- Brushaber v. Union Pacific Railroad (1916)
- Union Pacific Railroad v. Brotherhood of Locomotive Engineers (2009)
- List of United States Supreme Court cases, volume 113
