= Wilson–Gorman Tariff Act =

United States tariff reduction in 1894

- Other short titles: Revenue Act of 1894 · Tariff of 1894
- Long title: An Act To reduce taxation, to provide revenue for the Government, and for other purposes.
- Enacted by: the 53rd United States Congress
- Effective: August 27, 1894

Citations
- Statutes at Large: 28 Stat. 509

Codification
- Acts amended: McKinley Tariff (1890)

Legislative history
- Introduced in the House as H.R. 4864 by D‑WV William L. Wilsonth on December 19, 1893; Committee consideration by House Committee on Ways and Means · Senate Committee on Finance; Passed the House on February 1, 1894 (204–140); Passed the Senate on July 3, 1894 (39–34); Reported by the joint conference committee on July–August 1894; agreed to by the House on August 13, 1894 (182–106 (agreed to Senate amendments)); Left unsigned by President Grover Cleveland and became law on August 27, 1894

United States Supreme Court cases
- Pollock v. Farmers' Loan & Trust Co. (1895)

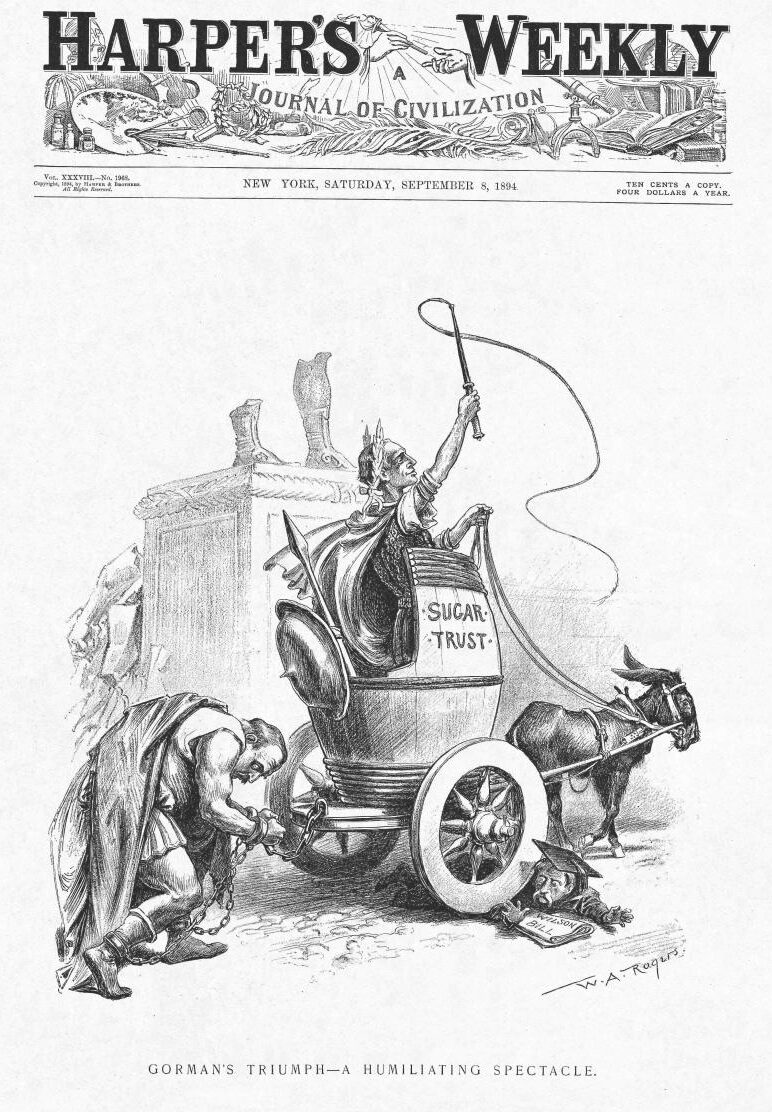
Gorman's Triumph – A Humiliating Spectacle, cartoon by W. A. Rogers depicting President Cleveland's humiliation by the Sugar Trust.

The Revenue Act or Wilson-Gorman Tariff of 1894 (ch. 349, §73, 28 Stat. 570, August 27, 1894) slightly reduced the United States tariff rates from the numbers set in the 1890 McKinley tariff and imposed a 2% tax on income over $4,000 (equivalent to $148,846 in 2025), which meant fewer than 1% of households would pay the tax. It is named for William L. Wilson, Representative from West Virginia, chair of the U.S. House Ways and Means Committee, and Senator Arthur P. Gorman of Maryland, both Democrats.

Supported by pro-free trade members of the Democratic Party, this attempt at tariff reform imposed the first peacetime income tax. The purpose of the income tax was to make up for revenue that would be lost by tariff reductions. The Democrats under the Second presidency of Grover Cleveland wanted to move away from the protectionism proposed by the McKinley tariff while Cleveland was still in office.

The bill introduced by Wilson and passed by the House significantly lowered tariff rates, in accordance with Democratic platform promises, and dropped the tariff to zero on iron ore, coal, lumber and wool, which angered American producers. With Senator Gorman operating behind the scenes, protectionists in the Senate added more than 600 amendments that nullified most of the reforms and raised rates again. The "Sugar Trust" in particular made changes that favored itself at the expense of the foreign competitors.

President Grover Cleveland, who had campaigned on lowering the tariff and supported Wilson's version of the bill, was devastated that his program had been ruined. He denounced the revised measure as a disgraceful product of "party perfidy and party dishonor," but still allowed it to become law without his signature, believing that it was better than nothing and was at the least an improvement over the McKinley tariff.

== Single Tax Amendment ==
Democratic Representative James G. Maguire of California, a Georgist, proposed an amendment to the bill that would have established a national single tax. Intended as a substitute for the income tax, it would have levied a direct tax of $31,311,125 on land values nationwide. Only six Representatives voted in favor: Michael D. Harter and Tom L. Johnson of Ohio, Charles Tracey and J. De Witt Warner of New York, Jerry Simpson of Kansas, and Maguire.

== Income Tax Amendment ==
The New York Times reported that many Democrats in the East "prefer to take the income tax, odious as it is, and unpopular as it is bound to be with their constituents" to defeating the tariff bill altogether. Democratic Representative Johnson of Ohio supported the income tax as the lesser of two evils: "he was for an income tax as against a tariff tax; but he believed, that it was un-Democratic, inquisitorial, and wrong in principle."

== Legacy ==
The income tax provision was struck down in 1895 by the U.S. Supreme Court case Pollock v. Farmers' Loan & Trust Co., 157 U.S. 429 (1895). In 1913, the 16th Amendment permitted a federal income tax.

The tariff provisions of Wilson-Gorman were superseded by the Dingley Tariff of 1897.
