= Bowers v. Kerbaugh-Empire Co. =

- Supreme Court of the United States

Argued January 25, 1926 Decided May 3, 1926
- Full case name: Bowers, Collector of Internal Revenue v. Kerbaugh-Empire Company
- Citations: 271 U.S. 170 (more) 46 S. Ct. 449; 70 L. Ed. 886; 1926 U.S. LEXIS 615; 1 U.S. Tax Cas. (CCH) ¶ 174; 5 A.F.T.R. (P-H) 6014; 1926 P.H. P1865

Case history
- Prior: Kerbaugh-Empire Co. v. Bowers, 300 F. 938 (S.D.N.Y. 1924)

Holding
- No taxable income arose from the repayment in German marks of loans that had originally been made in U.S. dollars, despite the fact that the marks had gone down in value relative to the dollar since the loan had been made.

Court membership
- Chief Justice William H. Taft Associate Justices Oliver W. Holmes Jr. · Willis Van Devanter; James C. McReynolds · Louis Brandeis; George Sutherland · Pierce Butler; Edward T. Sanford · Harlan F. Stone

Case opinions
- Majority: Butler, joined by Taft, Holmes, Van Devanter, McReynolds, Sutherland, Sanford, Stone
- Concurrence: Brandeis

Laws applied
- U.S. Const. amend. XVI

Bowers v. Kerbaugh-Empire Co., 271 U.S. 170 (1926), was a case in which the United States Supreme Court held that no taxable income arose from the repayment in German marks of loans that had originally been made in U.S. dollars, despite the fact that the marks had gone down in value relative to the dollar since the loan had been made.

This decision was narrowed by the court six years later in United States v. Kirby Lumber Co..
