= Sixteenth Amendment to the United States Constitution =

1913 amendment

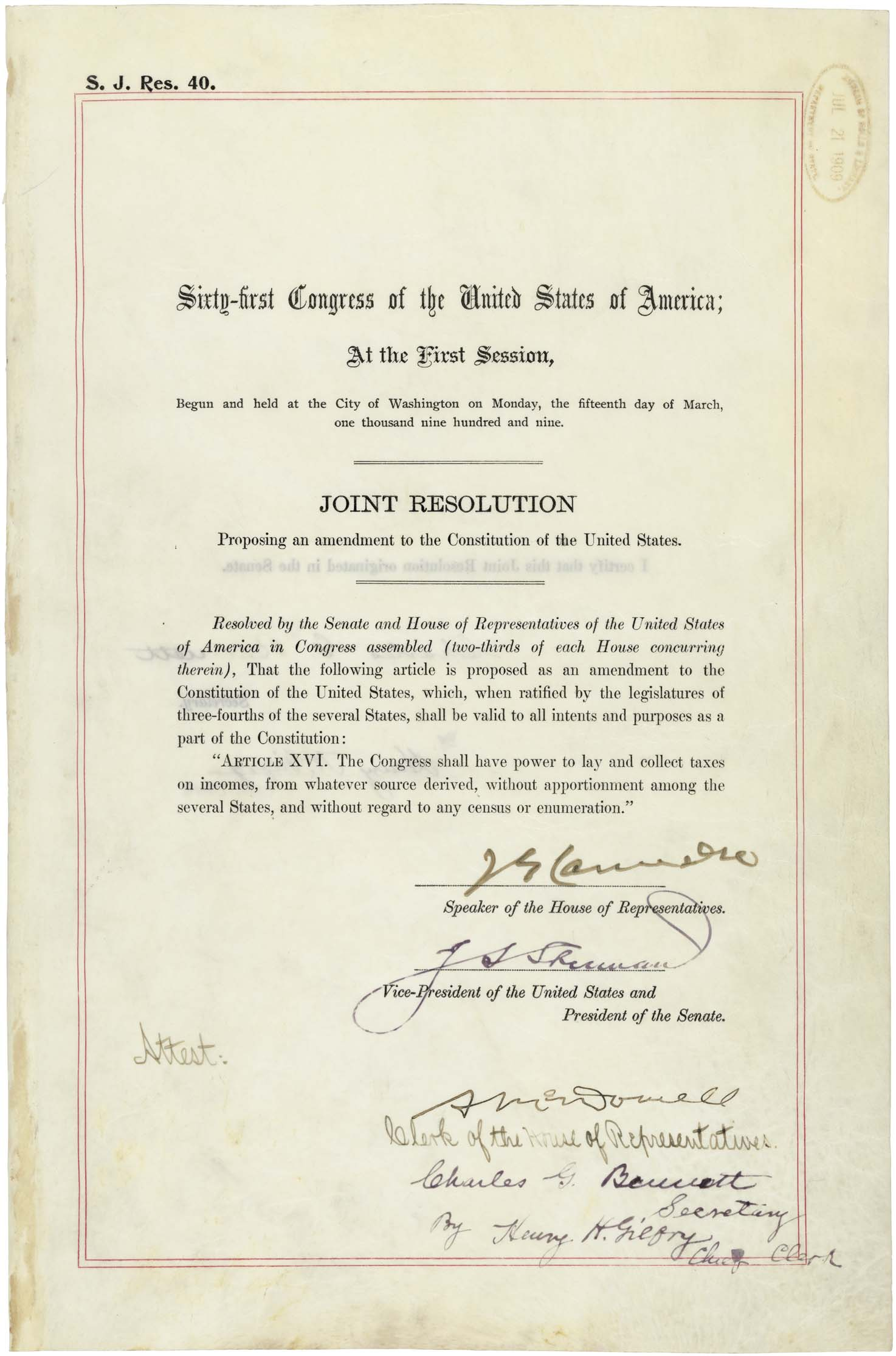
The Sixteenth Amendment in the National Archives

The Sixteenth Amendment (Amendment XVI) to the United States Constitution allows Congress to levy an income tax without apportioning it among the states on the basis of population. It was passed by Congress in 1909 in response to the 1895 Supreme Court case of Pollock v. Farmers' Loan & Trust Co. The Sixteenth Amendment was ratified by the requisite number of states on February 3, 1913, and effectively overruled the Supreme Court's ruling in Pollock.

Prior to the early 20th century, most federal revenue came from tariffs rather than taxes, although Congress had often imposed excise taxes on various goods. The Revenue Act of 1861 had introduced the first federal income tax, but that tax was repealed in 1872. During the late nineteenth century, various groups, including the Populist Party, favored the establishment of a progressive income tax at the federal level. These groups believed that tariffs unfairly taxed the poor, and they favored using the income tax to shift the tax burden onto wealthier individuals. The 1894 Wilson–Gorman Tariff Act contained an income tax provision, but the tax was struck down by the Supreme Court in the case of Pollock v. Farmers' Loan & Trust Co. In its ruling, the Supreme Court did not hold that all federal income taxes were unconstitutional, but rather held that income taxes on rents, dividends, and interest were direct taxes and thus had to be apportioned among the states on the basis of population.

For several years after Pollock, Congress did not attempt to implement another income tax, largely because of concerns that the Supreme Court would strike down any attempt to levy an income tax. In 1909, during the debate over the Payne–Aldrich Tariff Act, Congress proposed the Sixteenth Amendment to the states. Though conservative Republican leaders had initially expected that the amendment would not be ratified, a coalition of Democrats, progressive Republicans, and other groups ensured that the necessary number of states ratified the amendment. Shortly after the amendment was ratified, Congress imposed a federal income tax with the Revenue Act of 1913. The Supreme Court upheld that income tax in the 1916 case of Brushaber v. Union Pacific Railroad Co., and the federal government has continued to levy an income tax since 1913.

Critics of the Sixteenth Amendment have argued that it enables expansive federal government spending and facilitates central banking policies, with some, including Congressman Ron Paul, calling for its repeal on these and related grounds.

== Text ==
The Congress shall have power to lay and collect taxes on incomes, from whatever source derived, without apportionment among the several States, and without regard to any census or enumeration.

== Other constitutional provisions regarding taxes ==
Article I, Section 2, Clause 3:

Representatives and direct taxes shall be apportioned among the several States which may be included within this Union, according to their respective Numbers ...

Article I, Section 8, Clause 1:

The Congress shall have Power to lay and collect Taxes, Duties, Imposts and Excises, to pay the Debts and provide for the common Defence and general Welfare of the United States; but all Duties, Imposts and Excises shall be uniform throughout the United States.

Article I, Section 9, Clause 4:

No Capitation, or other direct, Tax shall be laid, unless in proportion to the Census or Enumeration herein before directed to be taken.

This clause basically refers to a tax on property, such as a tax based on the value of land, as well as a capitation.

Article I, Section 9, Clause 5:

No Tax or Duty shall be laid on Articles exported from any State.

== Income taxes before the Pollock case ==
Until 1913, customs duties (tariffs) and excise taxes were the primary sources of federal revenue. During the War of 1812, Secretary of the Treasury Alexander J. Dallas made the first public proposal for an income tax, but it was never implemented. The Congress did introduce an income tax to fund the Civil War through the Revenue Act of 1861. It levied a flat tax of three percent on annual income above $800. This act was replaced the following year with the Revenue Act of 1862, which levied a graduated tax of three to five percent on income above $600 and specified a termination of income taxation in 1866. The Civil War income taxes, which expired in 1872, proved to be both highly lucrative and drawing mostly from the more industrialized states, with New York, Pennsylvania, and Massachusetts generating about 60 percent of the total revenue that was collected. During the two decades following the expiration of the Civil War income tax, the Greenback movement, the Labor Reform Party, the Populist Party, the Democratic Party and many others called for a graduated income tax.

The Socialist Labor Party advocated a graduated income tax in 1887. The Populist Party "demand[ed] a graduated income tax" in its 1892 platform. The Democratic Party, led by William Jennings Bryan, advocated the income tax law passed in 1894, and proposed an income tax in its 1908 platform. Proponents of the income tax generally believed that high tariff rates exacerbated income inequality, and wanted to use the income tax to shift the burden of funding the government away from working class consumers and to high-earning businessmen.

Before Pollock v. Farmers' Loan & Trust Co., all income taxes had been considered to be indirect taxes imposed without respect to geography, unlike direct taxes, that have to be apportioned among the states according to population.

== The Pollock case ==
In 1894, an amendment was attached to the Wilson–Gorman Tariff Act that attempted to impose a federal tax of two percent on incomes over $4,000 (equal to $149,000 in 2025). The federal income tax was strongly favored in the South, and it was moderately supported in the eastern North Central states, but it was strongly opposed in the Far West and the Northeastern States (with the exception of New Jersey). The tax was derided as "un-Democratic, inquisitorial, and wrong in principle".

In Pollock v. Farmers' Loan & Trust Co., the U.S. Supreme Court declared certain taxes on incomes, such as those on property under the 1894 Act, to be unconstitutionally unapportioned direct taxes. The Court reasoned that a tax on income from property should be treated as a tax on "property by reason of its ownership" and so should be required to be apportioned. The reasoning was that taxes on the rents from land, the dividends from stocks, and so forth, burdened the property generating the income in the same way that a tax on "property by reason of its ownership" burdened that property.

After Pollock, while income taxes on wages (as indirect taxes) were still not required to be apportioned by population, taxes on interest, dividends, and rental income were required to be apportioned by population. The Pollock ruling made the source of the income (e.g., property versus labor, etc.) relevant in determining whether the tax imposed on that income was deemed to be "direct" (and thus required to be apportioned among the states according to population) or, alternatively, "indirect" (and thus required only to be imposed with geographical uniformity).

Dissenting in Pollock, Justice John Marshall Harlan stated:

When, therefore, this court adjudges, as it does now adjudge, that Congress cannot impose a duty or tax upon personal property, or upon income arising either from rents of real estate or from personal property, including invested personal property, bonds, stocks, and investments of all kinds, except by apportioning the sum to be so raised among the States according to population, it practically decides that, without an amendment of the Constitution—two-thirds of both Houses of Congress and three-fourths of the States concurring—such property and incomes can never be made to contribute to the support of the national government.

Members of Congress responded to Pollock by expressing widespread concern that many of the wealthiest Americans had consolidated too much economic power. Nonetheless, in the years after Pollock, Congress did not implement another federal income tax, partly because many Congressmen feared that any tax would be struck down by the Supreme Court. Few considered attempting to impose an apportioned income tax, since such a tax was widely regarded as unworkable.

== Adoption ==
On June 16, 1909, President William Howard Taft, in an address to the Sixty-first Congress, proposed a two percent federal income tax on corporations by way of an excise tax and a constitutional amendment to allow the previously enacted income tax.

Upon the privilege of doing business as an artificial entity and of freedom from a general partnership liability enjoyed by those who own the stock.

An income tax amendment to the Constitution was first proposed by Senator Norris Brown of Nebraska. He submitted two proposals, Senate Resolutions Nos. 25 and 39. The amendment proposal finally accepted was Senate Joint Resolution No. 40, introduced by Senator Nelson W. Aldrich of Rhode Island, the Senate majority leader and Finance Committee Chairman. The amendment was proposed as part of the congressional debate over the 1909 Payne–Aldrich Tariff Act; by proposing the amendment, Aldrich hoped to temporarily defuse progressive calls for the imposition of new taxes in the tariff act. Aldrich and other conservative leaders in Congress largely opposed the actual ratification of the amendment, but they believed that it had little chance of being ratified, as ratification required approval by three quarters of the state legislatures.

On July 12, 1909, the resolution proposing the Sixteenth Amendment was passed by the Congress and was submitted to the state legislatures. Support for the income tax was strongest in the western and southern states, while opposition was strongest in the northeastern states. Supporters of the income tax believed that it would be a much better method of gathering revenue than tariffs, which were the primary source of revenue at the time. From well before 1894, Democrats, Progressives, Populists and other left-oriented parties argued that tariffs disproportionately affected the poor, interfered with prices, were unpredictable, and were an intrinsically limited source of revenue. The South and the West tended to support income taxes because their residents were generally less prosperous, more agricultural and more sensitive to fluctuations in commodity prices. A sharp rise in the cost of living between 1897 and 1913 greatly increased support for the idea of income taxes, including in the urban Northeast. A growing number of Republicans also began supporting the idea, notably Theodore Roosevelt and the "Insurgent" Republicans (who would go on to form the Progressive Party). These Republicans were driven mainly by a fear of the increasingly large and sophisticated military forces of Japan, Britain and the European powers, their own imperial ambitions, and the perceived need to defend American merchant ships. Moreover, these progressive Republicans were convinced that central governments could play a positive role in national economies. A bigger government and a bigger military, they argued, required a correspondingly larger and steadier source of revenue to support it.

Opposition to the Sixteenth Amendment was led by establishment Republicans because of their close ties to wealthy industrialists, although not even they were uniformly opposed to the general idea of a permanent income tax. In 1910, New York Governor Charles Evans Hughes, shortly before becoming a Supreme Court Justice, spoke out against the income tax amendment. Hughes supported the idea of a federal income tax, but believed the words "from whatever source derived" in the proposed amendment implied that the federal government would have the power to tax state and municipal bonds. He believed this would excessively centralize governmental power and "would make it impossible for the state to keep any property".

Between 1909 and 1913, several conditions favored passage of the Sixteenth Amendment. Inflation was high and many blamed federal tariffs for the rising prices. The Republican Party was divided and weakened by the loss of Roosevelt and the Insurgents who joined the Progressive Party, a problem that blunted opposition even in the Northeast. In 1912, the Democrats won the presidency and control of both houses of Congress. The country was generally in a left-leaning mood, with a member of the Socialist Party winning a seat in the U.S. House in 1910 and the party's presidential candidate polling six percent of the popular vote in 1912.

Three advocates of a federal income tax ran in the presidential election of 1912. On February 25, 1913, Secretary of State Philander Knox proclaimed that the amendment had been ratified by three-fourths of the states and so had become part of the Constitution. The Revenue Act of 1913, which greatly lowered tariffs and implemented a federal income tax, was enacted shortly after the Sixteenth Amendment was ratified.

=== Ratification ===
According to the United States Government Publishing Office, the following states ratified the amendment:

1. Alabama: August 10, 1909
2. Kentucky: February 8, 1910
3. South Carolina: February 19, 1910
4. Illinois: March 1, 1910
5. Mississippi: March 7, 1910
6. Oklahoma: March 10, 1910
7. Maryland: April 8, 1910
8. Georgia: August 3, 1910
9. Texas: August 16, 1910
10. Ohio: January 19, 1911
11. Idaho: January 20, 1911
12. Oregon: January 23, 1911
13. Washington: January 26, 1911
14. Montana: January 27, 1911
15. Indiana: January 30, 1911
16. California: January 31, 1911
17. Nevada: January 31, 1911
18. South Dakota: February 1, 1911
19. Nebraska: February 9, 1911
20. North Carolina: February 11, 1911
21. Colorado: February 15, 1911
22. North Dakota: February 17, 1911
23. Michigan: February 23, 1911
24. Iowa: February 24, 1911
25. Kansas: March 2, 1911
26. Missouri: March 16, 1911
27. Maine: March 31, 1911
28. Tennessee: April 7, 1911
29. Arkansas: April 22, 1911, after having previously rejected the amendment
30. Wisconsin: May 16, 1911
31. New York: July 12, 1911
32. Arizona: April 3, 1912
33. Minnesota: June 11, 1912
34. Louisiana: June 28, 1912
35. West Virginia: January 31, 1913
36. Delaware: February 3, 1913

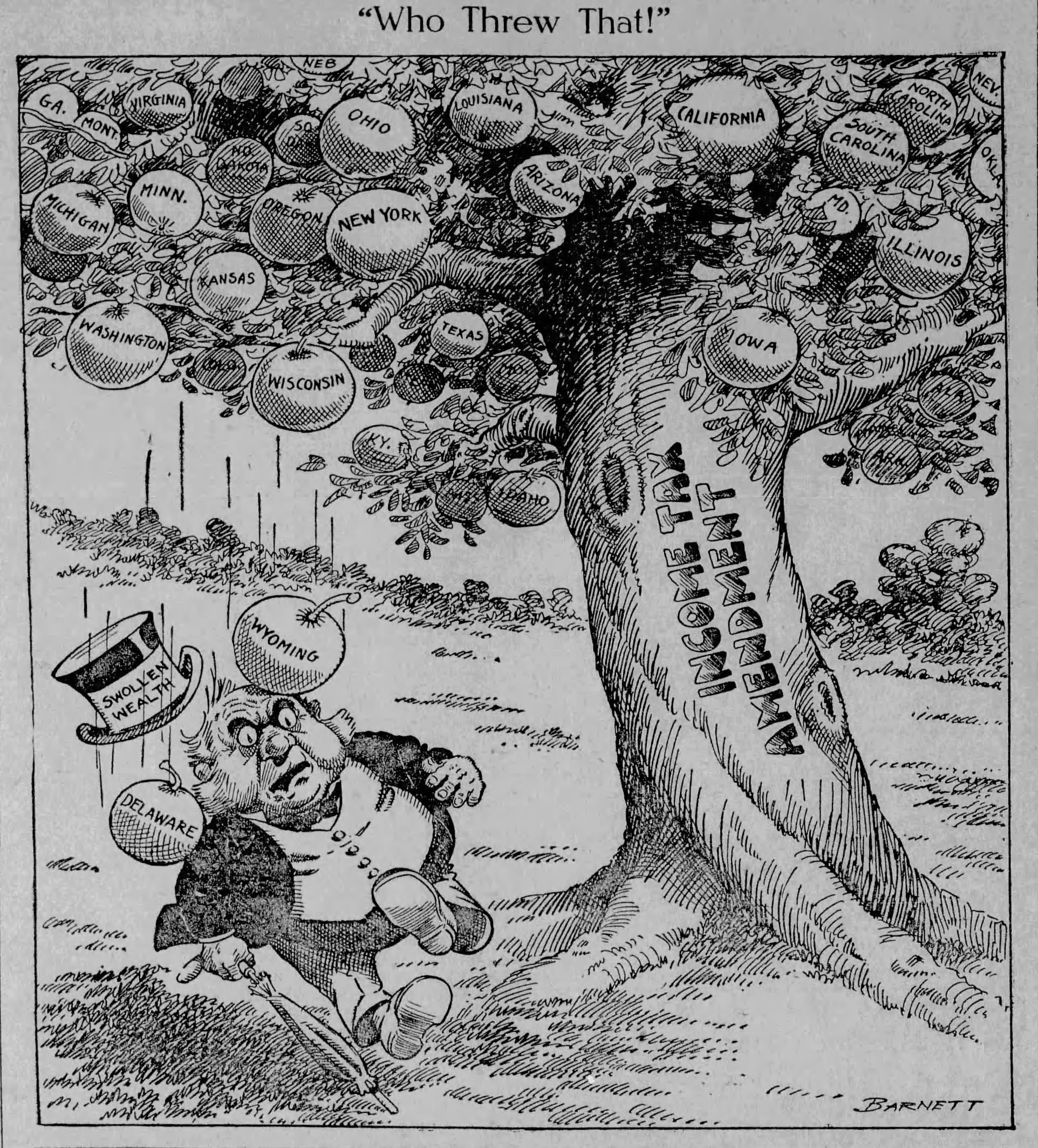
Comic depicting the ratification of the Sixteenth Amendment

Ratification (by the requisite 36 states) was completed on February 3, 1913, with the ratification by Delaware. The amendment was subsequently ratified by the following states, bringing the total number of ratifying states to forty-two of the forty-eight then existing:

37. New Mexico: (February 3, 1913)
38. Wyoming: (February 3, 1913)
39. New Jersey: (February 4, 1913)
40. Vermont: (February 19, 1913)
41. Massachusetts: (March 4, 1913)
42. New Hampshire: (March 7, 1913), after rejecting the amendment on March 2, 1911

The legislatures of the following states rejected the amendment without ever subsequently ratifying it:

- Connecticut
- Rhode Island
- Utah
- Virginia

The legislatures of the following states never considered the proposed amendment:

- Florida
- Pennsylvania

== Case law ==
The federal courts' interpretations of the Sixteenth Amendment have changed considerably over time and there have been many disputes about the applicability of the amendment.

=== The Brushaber case ===
In Brushaber v. Union Pacific Railroad, 240 U.S. 1 (1916), the Supreme Court ruled that (1) the Sixteenth Amendment removes the Pollock requirement that certain income taxes (such as taxes on income "derived from real property" that were the subject of the Pollock decision), be apportioned among the states according to population; (2) the federal income tax statute does not violate the Fifth Amendment's prohibition against the government taking property without due process of law; (3) the federal income tax statute does not violate the Article I, Section 8, Clause 1 requirement that excises, also known as indirect taxes, be imposed with geographical uniformity.

=== The Kerbaugh-Empire Co. case ===
In Bowers v. Kerbaugh-Empire Co., 271 U.S. 170 (1926), the Supreme Court, through Justice Pierce Butler, stated:

It was not the purpose or the effect of that amendment to bring any new subject within the taxing power. Congress already had the power to tax all incomes. But taxes on incomes from some sources had been held to be "direct taxes" within the meaning of the constitutional requirement as to apportionment. [citations omitted] The Amendment relieved from that requirement and obliterated the distinction in that respect between taxes on income that are direct taxes and those that are not, and so put on the same basis all incomes "from whatever source derived". [citations omitted] "Income" has been taken to mean the same thing as used in the Corporation Excise Tax of 1909 (36 Stat. 112), in the Sixteenth Amendment, and in the various revenue acts subsequently passed. [citations omitted] After full consideration, this court declared that income may be defined as gain derived from capital, from labor, or from both combined, including profit gained through sale or conversion of capital.

=== The Glenshaw Glass case ===
In Commissioner v. Glenshaw Glass Co., 348 U.S. 426 (1955), the Supreme Court laid out what has become the modern understanding of what constitutes "gross income" to which the Sixteenth Amendment applies, declaring that income taxes could be levied on "accessions to wealth, clearly realized, and over which the taxpayers have complete dominion". Under this definition, any increase in wealth—whether through wages, benefits, bonuses, sale of stock or other property at a profit, bets won, lucky finds, awards of punitive damages in a lawsuit, qui tam actions—are all within the definition of income, unless the Congress makes a specific exemption, as it has for items such as life insurance proceeds received by reason of the death of the insured party, gifts, bequests, devises and inheritances, and certain scholarships.

=== Income taxation of wages, etc. ===
Federal courts have ruled that the Sixteenth Amendment allows a direct tax on "wages, salaries, commissions, etc. without apportionment".

=== The Penn Mutual case ===
Although the Sixteenth Amendment is often cited as the "source" of the congressional power to tax incomes, at least one court has reiterated the point made in Brushaber and other cases that the Sixteenth Amendment itself did not grant the Congress the power to tax incomes, a power the Congress had since 1789, but only removed the possible requirement that any income tax be apportioned among the states according to their respective populations. In Penn Mutual Indemnity, the United States Tax Court stated:

In dealing with the scope of the taxing power the question has sometimes been framed in terms of whether something can be taxed as income under the Sixteenth Amendment. This is an inaccurate formulation ... and has led to much loose thinking on the subject. The source of the taxing power is not the Sixteenth Amendment; it is Article I, Section 8, of the Constitution.

The United States Court of Appeals for the Third Circuit agreed with the Tax Court, stating:

It did not take a constitutional amendment to entitle the United States to impose an income tax. Pollock v. Farmers' Loan & Trust Co., 157 U. S. 429, 158 U. S. 601 (1895), only held that a tax on the income derived from real or personal property was so close to a tax on that property that it could not be imposed without apportionment. The Sixteenth Amendment removed that barrier. Indeed, the requirement for apportionment is pretty strictly limited to taxes on real and personal property and capitation taxes.

It is not necessary to uphold the validity of the tax imposed by the United States that the tax itself bear an accurate label. Indeed, the tax upon the distillation of spirits, imposed very early by federal authority, now reads and has read in terms of a tax upon the spirits themselves, yet the validity of this imposition has been upheld for a very great many years.

It could well be argued that the tax involved here [an income tax] is an "excise tax" based upon the receipt of money by the taxpayer. It certainly is not a tax on property and it certainly is not a capitation tax; therefore, it need not be apportioned. We do not think it profitable, however, to make the label as precise as that required under the Food and Drug Act. Congress has the power to impose taxes generally, and if the particular imposition does not run afoul of any constitutional restrictions then the tax is lawful, call it what you will.

=== The Murphy case ===
On December 22, 2006, a three-judge panel of the United States Court of Appeals for the District of Columbia Circuit vacated its unanimous decision (of August 2006) in Murphy v. Internal Revenue Service and United States. In an unrelated matter, the court had also granted the government's motion to dismiss Murphy's suit against the Internal Revenue Service. Under federal sovereign immunity, a taxpayer may sue the federal government, but not a government agency, officer, or employee (with some exceptions). The Court ruled:

Insofar as the Congress has waived sovereign immunity with respect to suits for tax refunds under 28 U.S.C. § 1346(a)(1), that provision specifically contemplates only actions against the "United States". Therefore, we hold the IRS, unlike the United States, may not be sued eo nomine in this case.

An exception to federal sovereign immunity is in the United States Tax Court, in which a taxpayer may sue the Commissioner of Internal Revenue. The original three-judge panel then agreed to rehear the case itself. In its original decision, the Court had ruled that 26 U.S.C. § 104(a)(2) was unconstitutional under the Sixteenth Amendment to the extent that the statute purported to tax, as income, a recovery for a nonphysical personal injury for mental distress and loss of reputation not received in lieu of taxable income such as lost wages or earnings.

Because the August 2006 opinion was vacated, the Court of Appeals did not hear the case en banc.

On July 3, 2007, the Court (through the original three-judge panel) ruled (1) that the taxpayer's compensation was received on account of a nonphysical injury or sickness; (2) that gross income under section 61 of the Internal Revenue Code does include compensatory damages for nonphysical injuries, even if the award is not an "accession to wealth", (3) that the income tax imposed on an award for nonphysical injuries is an indirect tax, regardless of whether the recovery is restoration of "human capital", and therefore the tax does not violate the constitutional requirement of Article I, Section 9, Clause 4, that capitations or other direct taxes must be laid among the states only in proportion to the population; (4) that the income tax imposed on an award for nonphysical injuries does not violate the constitutional requirement of Article I, Section 8, Clause 1, that all duties, imposts and excises be uniform throughout the United States; (5) that under the doctrine of sovereign immunity, the Internal Revenue Service may not be sued in its own name.

The Court stated that "[a]lthough the 'Congress cannot make a thing income which is not so in fact', ... it can label a thing income and tax it, so long as it acts within its constitutional authority, which includes not only the Sixteenth Amendment but also Article I, Sections 8 and 9." The court ruled that Ms. Murphy was not entitled to the tax refund she claimed, and that the personal injury award she received was "within the reach of the Congressional power to tax under Article I, Section 8 of the Constitution" even if the award was "not income within the meaning of the Sixteenth Amendment". See also the Penn Mutual case cited above.

On April 21, 2008, the U.S. Supreme Court declined to review the decision by the Court of Appeals.

== See also ==
- Tax protester Sixteenth Amendment arguments
