= Corporate tax in the United States =

Form of taxation in the United States

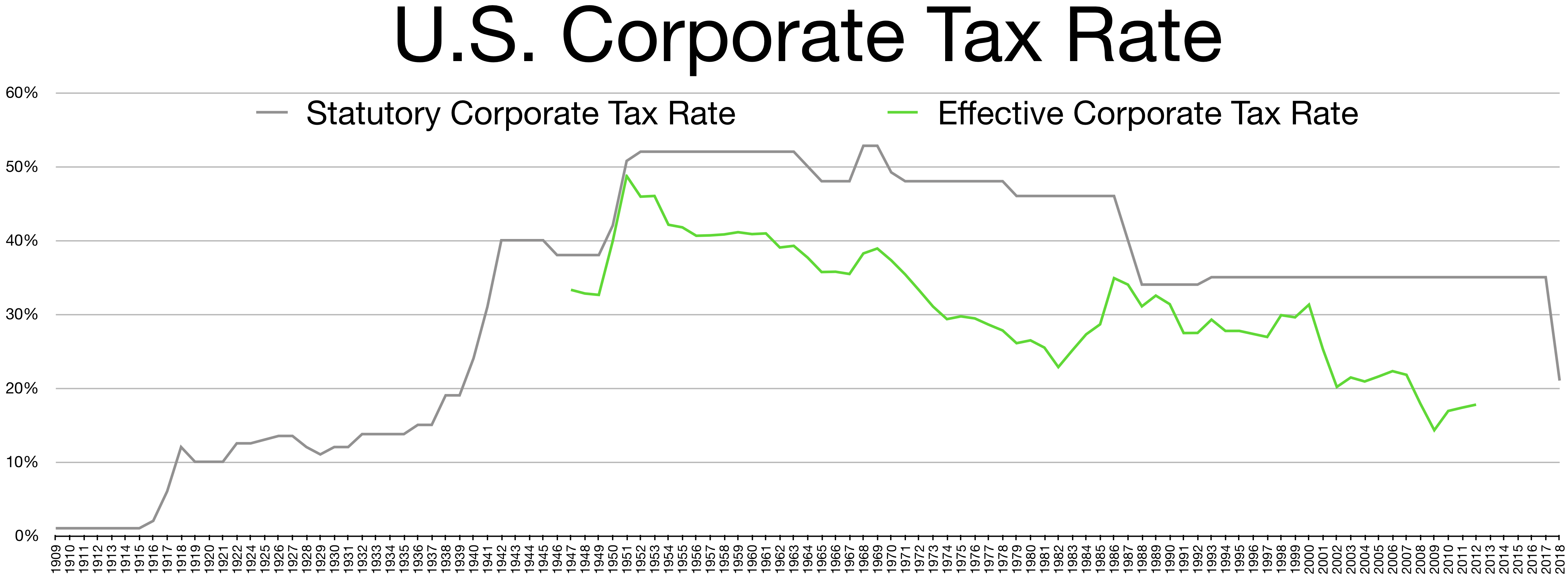
Statutory corporate tax rate Effective corporate tax rate

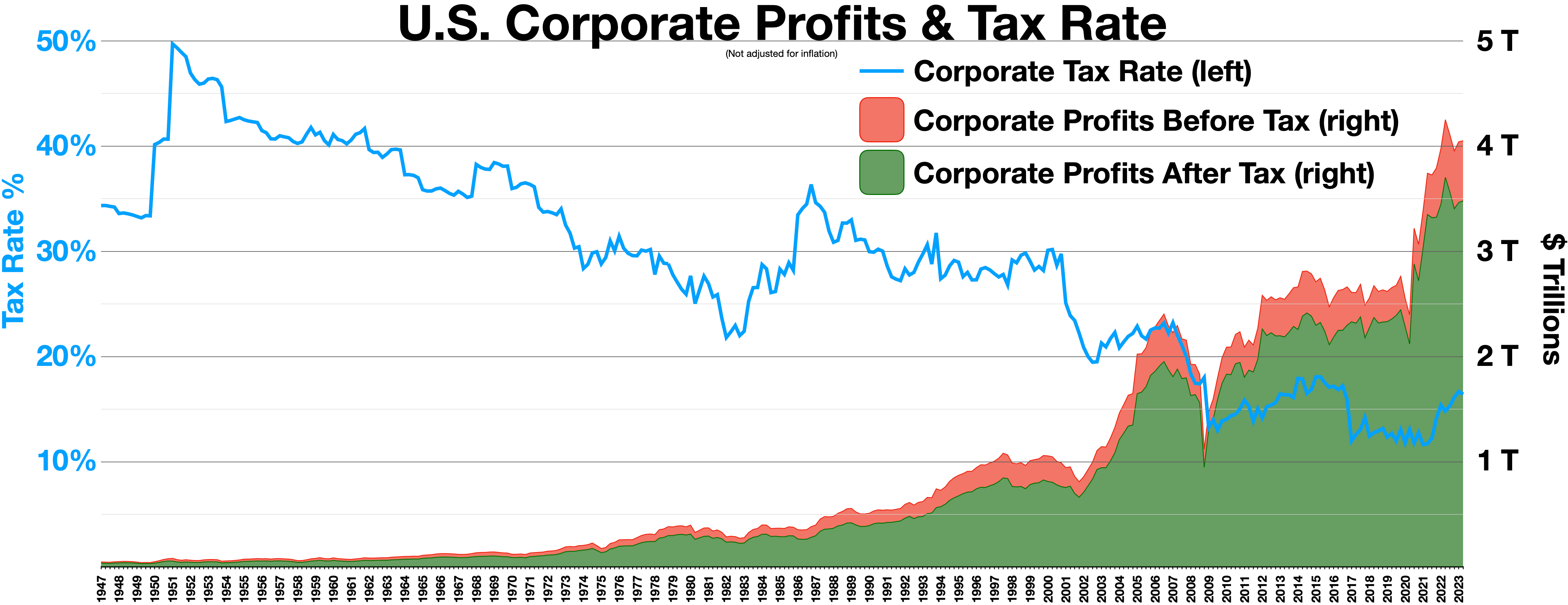
U.S. corporate profits and tax rate Effective tax rate (left) Corporate profits before tax Corporate profits after tax

Corporate tax in the United States is imposed at the federal, most state, and some local levels on the income of entities treated for tax purposes as corporations. Since January 1, 2018, the federal corporate income tax has been a flat 21% under the Tax Cuts and Jobs Act of 2017 (TCJA, P.L. 115-97), signed December 22, 2017, replacing a graduated structure ranging from 15% to 35%. State and local taxes and rules vary by jurisdiction, although many are based on federal concepts and definitions. Forty-four states and the District of Columbia impose a corporate income tax, with top rates in 2026 ranging from 2.0% in North Carolina to 11.5% in New Jersey.

The Inflation Reduction Act of 2022 (IRA, P.L. 117-169) added two significant federal corporate-level taxes effective for tax years beginning after December 31, 2022: a 15% corporate alternative minimum tax (CAMT) on the adjusted financial statement income of large corporations, and a 1% excise tax on stock repurchases by publicly traded domestic corporations. The One Big Beautiful Bill Act (OBBBA, P.L. 119-21), signed July 4, 2025, made most TCJA business provisions permanent, restored immediate domestic research and experimental expensing under 26 U.S.C. § 174A, restored 100% bonus depreciation permanently, and renamed GILTI as Net CFC Tested Income (NCTI) and FDII as Foreign-Derived Deduction Eligible Income (FDDEI), with revised effective rates of 12.6% and 14% respectively for tax years beginning after December 31, 2025.

Most domestic corporations are taxed on their worldwide income, with foreign-source income taxed under a quasi-territorial regime that includes a participation exemption for certain foreign-source dividends (26 U.S.C. § 245A), current inclusion of low-taxed foreign earnings under NCTI (26 U.S.C. § 951A), Subpart F anti-deferral rules (26 U.S.C. § 951), the base erosion and anti-abuse tax (BEAT, 26 U.S.C. § 59A), and retained passive foreign investment company (PFIC) reporting under Form 8621. Foreign corporations generally are taxed only on business income when the income is effectively connected with the conduct of a U.S. trade or business (i.e., in a branch). Tax is imposed at the corporate level under 26 U.S.C. § 11 and again at the shareholder level on dividend distributions, producing the classical "double taxation" of corporate earnings.

In fiscal year 2024, the federal corporate income tax produced $529.9 billion (about 10.8% of total federal receipts and 1.84% of gross domestic product), the highest absolute level in U.S. history. Receipts fell to $452.1 billion (8.6% of total receipts) in fiscal year 2025, primarily because of the OBBBA's restoration of immediate expensing for research and development and capital investment. The Congressional Budget Office projects corporate income tax receipts at 1.2% to 1.3% of GDP over the 2026–2036 budget window, below the 50-year historical average of 1.7% of GDP and within a historical range of 1.0% to 2.7%.

The corporate income tax applies to only part of the U.S. business sector. Almost half of all private employment in the United States is within businesses that pass income through to their owners' individual income tax returns rather than paying tax at the entity level; academic research finds that the pass-through share of private for-profit employment rose from approximately 15% in 1982 to 49% by 2020. S corporations, partnerships, limited liability companies, regulated investment companies, and real estate investment trusts are subject to specialized regimes that wholly or partially shift the tax burden to owners or shareholders.

== Overview ==
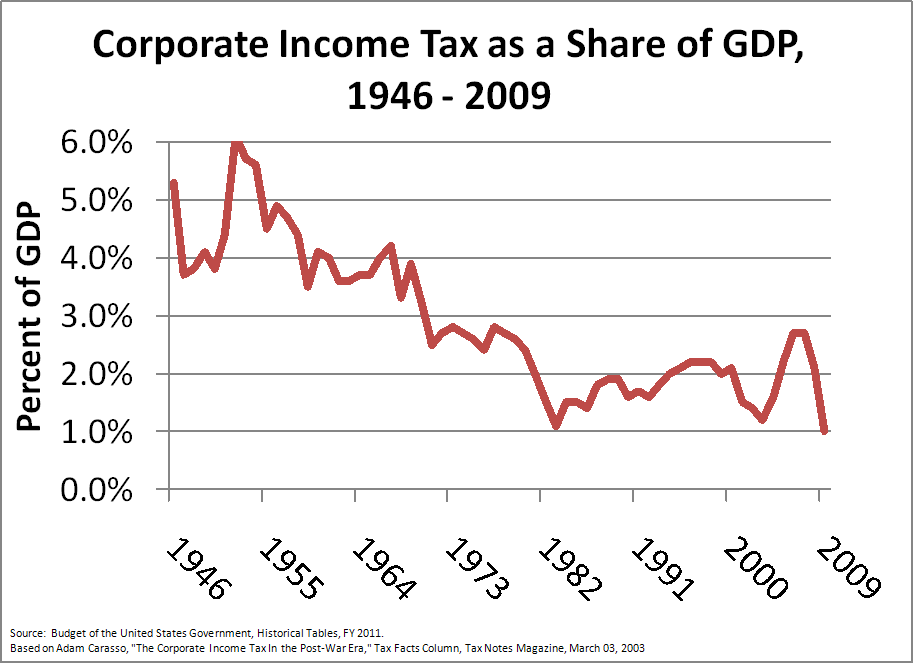
Corporate income tax as a share of GDP, 1946–2009. For more recent data see Tax revenue and effective rates below.

Corporate income tax is imposed at the federal level (Note: Reference herein to "States" and "states" means U.S. states and the District of Columbia.) on all entities treated as corporations (see Entity classification below), and by 44 states and the District of Columbia. State corporate income taxes are not imposed in Nevada, Ohio, South Dakota, Texas, Washington, and Wyoming; however, all of these states except South Dakota and Wyoming impose a gross receipts tax or business privilege tax on corporations. Delaware, Oregon, and Tennessee impose gross-receipts taxes in addition to a corporate income tax. Some local governments also impose a corporate income tax. The gross-receipts and franchise alternatives are not always less onerous than a net-income tax: Washington's business and occupation tax, for example, is computed as a percentage of gross revenue rather than net income, with the result that loss-making enterprises remain liable for the tax.

The federal corporate tax rate is a flat 21% under 26 U.S.C. § 11. (Note: Tax-exempt corporations under 26 U.S.C. § 501 (such as charitable organizations and certain other entities) and certain pass-through entities (such as S corporations) are not subject to the regular corporate tax.) A 15% corporate alternative minimum tax applies to "applicable corporations" with average annual adjusted financial statement income exceeding $1 billion. The base erosion and anti-abuse tax applies an additional layer at 10.5% (for tax years beginning after December 31, 2025; previously 10%) for certain large multinationals making cross-border deductible payments. A 1% excise tax applies to stock buybacks of publicly traded domestic corporations under 26 U.S.C. § 4501. The personal holding company tax (20%) and accumulated earnings tax (20%) remain in force as anti-avoidance backstops.

State corporate tax rates in 2026 range from a 2.0% flat rate in North Carolina (scheduled to be eliminated by 2030) to 11.5% in New Jersey. Corporate income tax is based on net taxable income as defined under federal or state law. Generally, taxable income for a corporation is gross income (business and possibly non-business receipts less cost of goods sold) less allowable tax deductions. Certain income, and some corporations, are subject to tax exemption. Interest and certain other expenses paid to related parties may be limited under various anti-base-erosion rules including 26 U.S.C. §§ 163–j (interest), 26 U.S.C. § 267A (hybrid arrangements), and 26 U.S.C. § 59A (BEAT).

Corporations may choose their tax year. Generally, a tax year must be 12 months or 52/53 weeks long. The tax year need not conform to the financial reporting year, and need not coincide with the calendar year, provided books are kept for the selected tax year. Corporations may change their tax year, which may require IRS consent. Most state income taxes are determined on the same tax year as the federal tax year.

Groups of companies are permitted to file single returns for the members of a controlled group or unitary group, known as consolidated returns, at the federal level, and are allowed or required to do so by certain states. The consolidated return reports the members' combined taxable incomes and computes a combined tax. Where related parties do not file a consolidated return in a jurisdiction, they are subject to transfer pricing rules. Under these rules, tax authorities may adjust prices charged between related parties under 26 U.S.C. § 482.

Shareholders of corporations are taxed separately upon the distribution of corporate earnings and profits as a dividend. Tax rates on dividends are at present lower than on ordinary income for both corporate and individual shareholders. Qualified dividends received by individuals are taxed at preferential rates of 0%, 15%, or 20% (plus the 3.8% net investment income tax in some cases). To ensure that shareholders pay tax on dividends, two withholding tax provisions may apply: withholding tax on foreign shareholders, and "backup withholding" on certain domestic shareholders.

Corporations must file tax returns in all U.S. jurisdictions imposing an income tax. Such returns are a self-assessment of tax. Corporate income tax is payable in advance installments, or estimated payments, at the federal level and for many states.

Corporations may be subject to withholding tax obligations upon making certain varieties of payments to others, including wages and distributions treated as dividends. These obligations are generally not the tax of the corporation, but the system may impose penalties on the corporation or its officers or employees for failing to withhold and pay over such taxes. The company number used by U.S. tax administration is the Employer Identification Number (EIN).

The architecture of U.S. business taxation is summarized in the diagram below. C corporations are subject to the regular 21% rate and (for the largest corporations) the 15% CAMT, plus a layered international regime; pass-through entities are taxed at the owner level; and a separate state layer applies that cannot be summarized by a single jurisdiction count, because some non-income-tax states impose franchise or gross-receipts taxes instead.

U.S. business activity

- C corporations
  - Regular federal corporate income tax — 21% under IRC §11
  - Large-corporation minimum tax — 15% CAMT on AFSI
  - Anti-base-erosion overlay — 10.5% BEAT
  - Stock repurchase excise tax — 1% under IRC §4501
  - International regime
    - IRC §245A participation exemption
    - Subpart F
    - NCTI (formerly GILTI) — 12.6% effective
    - FDDEI (formerly FDII) — 14% effective
- Pass-through entities
  - S corporations
  - Partnerships
  - Disregarded LLCs
  - IRC §199A — 20% QBI deduction
- State business taxation
  - Corporate income tax — 44 states + D.C.
  - Gross receipts / franchise / margin taxes — NV, OH, TX, WA (with DE, OR, TN supplements)
  - No state corporate income or gross-receipts tax — SD, WY

Table of corporate income taxes as a percentage of GDP for the US and OECD countries, 2008
| Country | Tax/GDP | Country | Tax/GDP |
|---|---|---|---|
| Norway | 12.4 | Switzerland | 3.3 |
| Australia | 5.9 | Netherlands | 3.2 |
| Luxembourg | 5.1 | Slovakia | 3.1 |
| New Zealand | 4.4 | Sweden | 3.0 |
| Czechia | 4.2 | France | 2.9 |
| South Korea | 4.2 | Ireland | 2.8 |
| Japan | 3.9 | Spain | 2.8 |
| Italy | 3.7 | Poland | 2.7 |
| Portugal | 3.7 | Hungary | 2.6 |
| Britain | 3.6 | Austria | 2.5 |
| Finland | 3.5 | Greece | 2.5 |
| Israel | 3.5 | Slovenia | 2.5 |
| OECD avg. | 3.5 | United States | 2.0 |
| Belgium | 3.4 | Germany | 1.9 |
| Canada | 3.4 | Iceland | 1.9 |
| Denmark | 3.3 | Turkey | 1.8 |

== Federal corporate tax rate and structure ==
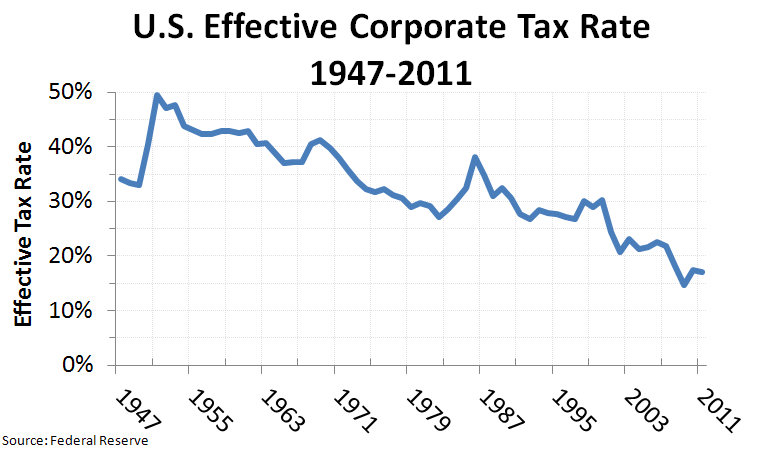
U.S. effective corporate tax rate, 1947–2011 (data through 2011; for current effective rates see Tax revenue and effective rates below).

=== Statutory rate ===
For tax years beginning after December 31, 2017, the federal corporate income tax rate is a flat 21% on all corporate taxable income. The 21% rate replaced the prior graduated structure that ranged from 15% (on the first $50,000 of income) to 35% (on income over $18.3 million for most corporations); personal service corporations formerly faced a flat 35% rate. The 21% rate is permanent under current law. (Note: "Permanent" in this context means without a sunset provision; the rate could be amended by future legislation. The 21% rate was unchanged by the One Big Beautiful Bill Act of 2025.)

The top corporate tax rate fell from a high of 53% in 1942 to 38% in 1993, although corporations in the top bracket were taxed at 35% between 1993 and 2017. The present 21% rate was adopted by TCJA effective for tax years beginning after December 31, 2017.

In addition to the regular 21% tax, the following federal corporate-level taxes may apply:

| Tax | Rate | Statutory authority | Applies to |
|---|---|---|---|
| Regular corporate income tax | 21% | 26 U.S.C. § 11 | All C corporations |
| Corporate alternative minimum tax (CAMT) | 15% of adjusted financial statement income | 26 U.S.C. § 55, 26 U.S.C. § 56A, 26 U.S.C. § 59 | "Applicable corporations" (3-year average AFSI > $1 billion); foreign-parented groups also subject to $100 million U.S. AFSI test |
| Base erosion and anti-abuse tax (BEAT) | 10.5% (10% for years before 2026) | 26 U.S.C. § 59A | Large multinationals (3-year average gross receipts ≥ $500 million; base erosion percentage ≥ 3% (2% for banks/securities dealers)) |
| Stock repurchase excise tax | 1% of net repurchases | 26 U.S.C. § 4501 | Publicly traded domestic corporations |
| Personal holding company tax | 20% of undistributed PHC income | 26 U.S.C. § 541–26 U.S.C. § 547 | Closely held corporations meeting PHC tests |
| Accumulated earnings tax | 20% | 26 U.S.C. § 531–26 U.S.C. § 537 | Corporations accumulating earnings beyond reasonable business needs |

The 21% rate is among the lower statutory rates in the OECD, although several other countries have enacted reductions since 2017. Combined with the average state corporate tax burden, the integrated U.S. federal-state statutory rate as of 2026 is approximately 25.7%.

The current 21% rate has not been changed since TCJA. In his fiscal year 2022, 2023, and 2024 budgets, President Joe Biden proposed raising the corporate rate from 21% to 28%; the proposal did not advance, and the One Big Beautiful Bill Act of 2025 reaffirmed the 21% rate as permanent law. President Trump publicly proposed during the 2024 campaign reducing the corporate rate to 15% for domestic manufacturers, but no rate change was ultimately enacted.

=== Corporate Alternative Minimum Tax (CAMT) ===
The Inflation Reduction Act of 2022 enacted a new 15% corporate alternative minimum tax effective for tax years beginning after December 31, 2022. The CAMT, codified in 26 U.S.C. § 55, 26 U.S.C. § 56A, and 26 U.S.C. § 59, applies to an "applicable corporation"—generally any corporation (other than an S corporation, regulated investment company, or real estate investment trust) whose average annual adjusted financial statement income (AFSI) over the most recent three taxable years exceeds $1 billion. For corporations that are members of a foreign-parented multinational group (FPMG), an additional test applies whereby the corporation also must have $100 million or more of average annual U.S. AFSI.

AFSI begins with net income reported on an "applicable financial statement" (typically GAAP financial statements) and is adjusted for items such as taxes, certain depreciation, defined benefit pension plan items, earnings and profits of foreign subsidiaries (including controlled foreign corporations), and various cooperative and partnership adjustments. A foreign tax credit (the "CAMT FTC") is allowed against the CAMT, and CAMT paid generates an indefinite-carryover credit usable against regular tax in future years.

The U.S. Treasury issued voluminous proposed regulations on September 12, 2024 (REG-112129-23), Notice 2025-27 (June 2025) (interim simplified method, lowering thresholds to $800 million / $80 million for the safe harbor), Notice 2025-28 (July 2025), Notice 2025-49 (September 2025), and Notice 2026-7 (February 2026), which collectively narrowed the scope of CAMT, added several taxpayer-favorable AFSI adjustments (for amortization of pre-OBBBA §174 expenditures, repair expenses, and §197 amortization), and announced that the 2024 proposed regulations would be substantially withdrawn and re-proposed. Treasury has stated that no portion of the September 2024 proposed regulations will apply for any taxable year before revised proposed regulations are issued.

The CAMT was originally projected by the Joint Committee on Taxation to raise about $222 billion over a decade and to apply to roughly 100 of the largest U.S. corporations. Treasury and the Trump administration have publicly criticized the regime as imposing significant administrative costs and have signaled an intent to issue revised, more taxpayer-favorable proposed regulations. The Joint Committee on Taxation publishes annual estimates of corporate tax expenditures; recent reports are available at jct.gov.

=== Base erosion and anti-abuse tax (BEAT) ===
Enacted as 26 U.S.C. § 59A by TCJA, BEAT functions as a minimum tax targeting base erosion payments by large U.S. corporations to foreign related parties. The OBBBA permanently set the BEAT rate at 10.5% (up from 10%) for tax years beginning after December 31, 2025—a smaller increase than the 12.5% rate that had been scheduled to take effect under TCJA. BEAT applies to corporations (other than RICs, REITs, or S corporations) with:

- average annual gross receipts of at least $500 million for the prior three taxable years (computed at the aggregate-group level), and
- a "base erosion percentage" (base erosion tax benefits divided by aggregate deductions) of at least 3% (2% for banks and registered securities dealers).

Modified taxable income (regular taxable income added back by base erosion payments and a portion of net operating loss deductions) is taxed at the BEAT rate, and the corporation pays the excess of that BEAT amount over its regular tax (after most credits). The OBBBA permanently retained the favorable add-back for the §41 research credit and a portion of certain §38 general business credits within the BEAT calculation.

=== Stock repurchase excise tax ===
The Inflation Reduction Act of 2022 added 26 U.S.C. § 4501, imposing a 1% excise tax on the fair market value of stock repurchases by publicly traded domestic corporations and certain U.S. domestic subsidiaries of publicly traded foreign corporations, effective for repurchases after December 31, 2022. The tax base is reduced by the fair market value of stock issued during the same taxable year (the "netting rule").

President Joe Biden's fiscal year 2024 budget proposal called for an increase to 4%, but no rate change was enacted; the rate remained 1% as of May 2026. On November 21, 2025, Treasury issued final regulations (T.D. 10037) that significantly narrowed the rule's scope: the previously broad "funding rule" was eliminated, and most acquisitive reorganizations, leveraged buyouts, "take-private" transactions, and complete liquidations under §§331 and 332 were excluded. The excise tax is reported on Form 720 with attached Form 7208 (Excise Tax on Repurchase of Corporate Stock) and is not deductible for federal income tax purposes by virtue of an amendment to 26 U.S.C. § 275.

=== Pre-2018 corporate AMT and other anti-avoidance taxes ===
The pre-2018 federal corporate alternative minimum tax (AMT), in force from 1986 through 2017, was repealed by the Tax Cuts and Jobs Act of 2017, effective for tax years beginning after December 31, 2017; AMT credit carryforwards generated under the prior regime were made refundable through the 2021 tax year. The pre-2018 AMT was reinstated in modified form by the Inflation Reduction Act of 2022's 15% corporate alternative minimum tax on adjusted financial statement income; see § Corporate Alternative Minimum Tax above.

Two pre-1986 anti-avoidance regimes remain in force as backstops against the use of a corporate vehicle to defer or eliminate shareholder-level tax:

- The personal holding company tax under 26 U.S.C. § 541–26 U.S.C. § 547 imposes an additional 20% tax on undistributed personal holding company income of closely held corporations whose income is predominantly passive (dividends, interest, royalties, rents, and certain personal-service compensation).
- The accumulated earnings tax under 26 U.S.C. § 531–26 U.S.C. § 537 imposes an additional 20% tax on accumulated taxable income of corporations formed or availed of for the purpose of avoiding the income tax on shareholders by accumulating earnings beyond the reasonable needs of the business.

Some states impose state-level alternative taxes on measures other than taxable income (gross receipts, capital, or specified asset bases); these are addressed in § State and local income taxes below.

== State and local income taxes ==
Nearly all of the states and some localities impose a tax on corporation income. The rules for determining this tax vary widely from state to state. Many states compute taxable income with reference to federal taxable income, with specific modifications. The states do not allow a tax deduction for income taxes, whether federal or state. Most states tax domestic and foreign corporations on taxable income derived from business activities apportioned to the state on a formulary basis. Many states apply a "throwback" or "throwout" rule to tax non-resident corporations on income that is not taxed by another state. Tax treaties do not apply to state taxes.

Under the U.S. Constitution, states are prohibited from taxing the income of a resident of another state unless the connection with the taxing state reaches a certain level (called "nexus"). Most states do not tax non-business income of out-of-state corporations. Since the tax must be fairly apportioned, the states and localities compute income of out-of-state corporations (including those in foreign countries) taxable in the state by applying formulary apportionment to the total business taxable income of the corporation. Many states use a formula based on ratios of property, payroll, and sales within the state to those items outside the state, although a growing number rely on a single sales-factor formula.

State and municipal taxes are deductible expenses for federal income tax purposes, although the federal deduction does not flow back through to reduce state taxable income.

=== Apportionment ===
Because the tax must be fairly apportioned, states and localities compute the income of out-of-state corporations (including those domiciled in foreign countries) by applying formulary apportionment to the corporation's total business taxable income. The traditional Uniform Division of Income for Tax Purposes Act (UDITPA) three-factor formula equally weights ratios of in-state property, payroll, and sales to the taxpayer's everywhere-totals. Since the 1990s a growing number of states have moved to a single-sales-factor formula on the rationale that it is less discriminatory toward in-state investment and payroll; by 2026 approximately 30 states use a single sales factor either for all industries or for most non-financial industries, while several others use a heavily sales-weighted formula (e.g., double-weighted sales).

Two complementary doctrines extend the reach of state corporate taxation in light of formulary apportionment:

- Throwback and throwout rules. A "throwback" rule treats sales of tangible personal property delivered into a state in which the seller is not taxable as if they had been made in the state of origin, throwing those sales back into the origin state's sales-factor numerator. A "throwout" rule, by contrast, excludes the untaxed sales from the everywhere-denominator. Both have been the subject of litigation under the Commerce Clause and the Due Process Clause.
- Market-based sourcing. For receipts from services and intangibles, the traditional rule sourced receipts to the state of performance ("cost-of-performance" sourcing). A clear majority of states have shifted to market-based sourcing—sourcing receipts to the location of the customer or the place where the benefit of the service is received—to align the sourcing rule with the single-sales-factor apportionment trend.

=== Public Law 86-272 and the digital nexus debate ===
Public Law 86-272 (15 U.S.C. §§381–384), enacted in 1959, prohibits states from imposing a net income tax on a business when its in-state activities consist solely of soliciting sales of tangible personal property, where orders are sent outside the state for approval and shipped from outside the state. In August 2021, the Multistate Tax Commission adopted a revised "Statement of Information" interpreting the law in light of internet commerce, taking the position that many common Internet-based activities (e.g., placing of cookies for non-ancillary purposes, post-sale customer support via online chat, and uploading job applications by non-sales personnel) constitute unprotected in-state activities that subject a remote seller to state corporate income tax. California (TAM 2022-01), New York (December 2023 regulations), New Jersey (June 2025 regulations), Massachusetts (2025 amendment to 830 CMR 63.39.1), Minnesota (Minnesota Revenue Notice 2022-13), and Illinois (informal Department of Revenue guidance) have adopted versions of the MTC's interpretation, while several state-court challenges remain pending as of May 2026.

=== State corporate income tax rates (2025–2026) ===
For 44 states and the District of Columbia, corporate income tax is imposed at a flat or graduated rate on the corporation's apportioned taxable income. The following table reflects 2025 rates as published by the Tax Foundation; rate changes effective January 1, 2026 are noted in parenthetical comments.

2025 state corporate income tax rates and brackets
| State | Rate (%) | Bracket |
|---|---|---|
| Alabama | 6.50 | flat |
| Alaska | 0–9.40 | graduated, 10 brackets ($0–$222,000+) |
| Arizona | 4.90 | flat |
| Arkansas | 1.0–4.30 | graduated, 4 brackets ($0–$11,000+) |
| California | 8.84 | flat (10.84% for financial corporations) |
| Colorado | 4.40 | flat |
| Connecticut | 7.50 | flat (8.25% on corporations with gross proceeds ≥ $100M, surtax extended to 2029) |
| Delaware | 8.70 | flat (plus gross-receipts tax) |
| Florida | 5.50 | flat (over $50,000 of taxable income) |
| Georgia | 5.39 | flat (continued phasedown to 5.19% in 2026, with triggered further reductions) |
| Hawaii | 4.40–6.40 | graduated, 3 brackets |
| Idaho | 5.695 | flat (reduced to 5.3% in 2025) |
| Illinois | 9.50 | flat (7% income tax + 2.5% personal property replacement tax) |
| Indiana | 4.90 | flat |
| Iowa | 5.50–7.10 | graduated, 2 brackets (consolidating to flat 5.5%) |
| Kansas | 3.50–6.50 | graduated, 2 brackets |
| Kentucky | 5.00 | flat |
| Louisiana | 5.50 | flat (reduced from 7.50% effective Jan. 1, 2025; corporation franchise tax repealed) |
| Maine | 3.50–8.93 | graduated, 4 brackets |
| Maryland | 8.25 | flat |
| Massachusetts | 8.00 | flat |
| Michigan | 6.00 | flat |
| Minnesota | 9.80 | flat |
| Mississippi | 4.00–5.00 | graduated, 2 brackets |
| Missouri | 4.00 | flat |
| Montana | 6.75 | flat |
| Nebraska | 5.20 | flat (reduced to 4.55% in 2026, scheduled to reach 3.99% in 2027 subject to revenue triggers) |
| Nevada | none | (Commerce Tax (gross receipts) applies) |
| New Hampshire | 7.50 | flat (Business Profits Tax) |
| New Jersey | 6.50–11.50 | graduated, 4 brackets; 2.5% Corporate Transit Fee applies to corporations with allocated taxable income > $10M (effective 2024) |
| New Mexico | 5.90 | flat (changed from graduated in 2025; base expanded to include Subpart F income) |
| New York | 6.50–7.25 | 7.25% rate applies to corporations with taxable income > $5M |
| North Carolina | 2.25 | flat (reduced to 2.0% in 2026; scheduled phase-out reaching 0% in 2030) |
| North Dakota | 1.41–4.31 | graduated, 3 brackets |
| Ohio | none | (Commercial Activity Tax applies) |
| Oklahoma | 4.00 | flat |
| Oregon | 6.60–7.60 | graduated, 2 brackets (plus Corporate Activity Tax) |
| Pennsylvania | 7.99 | flat (multi-year phase-down: 7.49% in 2026, reaching 4.99% by 2031) |
| Rhode Island | 7.00 | flat |
| South Carolina | 5.00 | flat |
| South Dakota | none | (no corporate income or gross-receipts tax) |
| Tennessee | 6.50 | flat (plus gross-receipts/franchise tax) |
| Texas | none | (Texas franchise tax (margin tax) applies) |
| Utah | 4.55 | flat |
| Vermont | 6.00–8.50 | graduated, 3 brackets |
| Virginia | 6.00 | flat |
| Washington | none | (Business and occupation tax (gross receipts) applies) |
| West Virginia | 6.50 | flat |
| Wisconsin | 7.90 | flat |
| Wyoming | none | (no corporate income or gross-receipts tax) |
| Washington, D.C. | 8.25 | flat |

For tax year 2026, four states reduced rates: Georgia (to 5.19%), Nebraska (to 4.55%), North Carolina (to 2.0%), and Pennsylvania (to 7.49%). Among states that impose a corporate income tax, the average top rate is approximately 6.57% with a median rate of 6.5%.

=== State corporate income tax rates (2010, historical reference) ===
The 2010 state corporate income tax structure is preserved here as historical reference and to illustrate the trajectory of state-level rate reductions over the post-financial-crisis period.

2010 state corporate income tax rates
| State | Rate(s) | Brackets |
|---|---|---|
| Alabama | 6.5% | flat |
| Alaska | 1–9.4% | 10 graduated brackets ($0/$10K/$20K/$30K/$40K/$50K/$60K/$70K/$80K/$90K) |
| Arizona | 6.968% | flat |
| Arkansas | 1/2/3/5/6/6.5% | 6 graduated brackets ($0/$3K/$6K/$11K/$25K/$100K) |
| California | 8.84% | flat (10.84% for banks) |
| Colorado | 4.63% | flat |
| Connecticut | 7.5% | flat |
| Delaware | 8.7% | flat |
| Florida | 5.5% | flat |
| Georgia | 6% | flat |
| Hawaii | 4.4/5.4/6.4% | 3 graduated brackets ($0/$25K/$100K) |
| Idaho | 7.6% | flat |
| Illinois | 7.3% | flat |
| Indiana | 8.5% | flat |
| Iowa | 6/8/10/12% | 4 graduated brackets ($0/$25K/$100K/$250K) |
| Kansas | 3% | flat |
| Kentucky | 4/5/6% | 3 graduated brackets ($0/$50K/$100K) |
| Louisiana | 4/5/6/7/8% | 5 graduated brackets ($0/$25K/$50K/$100K/$200K) |
| Maine | 3.5/7.93/8.33/8.93% | 4 graduated brackets ($0/$25K/$75K/$250K) |
| Maryland | 8.25% | flat |
| Massachusetts | 8.8% | flat |
| Michigan (Note: The Michigan Business Tax in effect in 2010 applied to both incorporated and unincorporated businesses on an alternative measure of income that did not necessarily correspond to federal net taxable income; it was replaced by a flat 6% corporate income tax effective January 1, 2012.) | 4.95% | flat (Michigan Business Tax) |
| Minnesota | 9.8% | flat |
| Mississippi | 3/4/5% | 3 graduated brackets ($0/$5K/$10K) |
| Missouri (Note: For tax years through 2019, Missouri permitted a deduction for federal income tax payments, reducing the effective state tax rate. The deduction was repealed in conjunction with the rate-reduction package effective January 1, 2020.) | 6.25% | flat (federal income tax deductible) |
| Montana (Note: A higher rate applies if the corporation elects "water's edge" apportionment under Mont. Code Ann. § 15-31-322.) | 6.75% | flat |
| Nebraska | 5.58/7.81% | 2 graduated brackets ($0/$100K) |
| Nevada | none | none |
| New Hampshire | 8.5% | flat (Business Profits Tax) |
| New Jersey | 9% | flat (alternative minimum assessment based on gross receipts) |
| New Mexico | 4.8/6.4/7.6% | 3 graduated brackets ($0/$500K/$1M) |
| New York | 7.1% | flat (alternative tax based on subsidiary capital) |
| North Carolina | 6.9% | flat |
| North Dakota | 2.1/5.3/6.4% | 3 graduated brackets ($0/$25K/$50K) |
| Ohio (Note: The Commercial Activity Tax was phased in from 2005 to 2008 while the corporate franchise tax (Ohio's corporate net income tax) was simultaneously phased out; the CAT rate was fully phased in at 0.26% effective April 1, 2009.) | 0.26% | Commercial Activity Tax (CAT) on gross receipts; CFT phased out 2005–2010 |
| Oklahoma | 6% | flat |
| Oregon | 6.6/7.9% | 2 graduated brackets ($0/$250K) |
| Pennsylvania | 9.99% | flat |
| Rhode Island | 9% | flat |
| South Carolina | 5% | flat |
| South Dakota | none | none |
| Tennessee | 6.5% | flat |
| Texas | Franchise tax | margin-based (see below) |
| Utah | 5% | flat |
| Vermont | 6/7/8.5% | 3 graduated brackets ($0/$10K/$25K) |
| Virginia | 6% | flat |
| Washington | none | none (B&O on gross receipts) |
| West Virginia | 8.5% | flat |
| Wisconsin | 7.9% | flat |
| Wyoming | none | none |
| Washington, D.C. | 9.975% | flat |

In 2010, six states imposed no corporate income tax (Nevada, South Dakota, Texas, Washington, Wyoming, and at the time also implicitly Ohio under the CAT regime); by 2026 the same six states (with Ohio replacing Texas's franchise-tax characterization for purposes of the Tax Foundation's tabulation) impose no corporate income tax in the conventional sense. The most significant rate reductions between 2010 and 2026 occurred in North Carolina (6.9% → 2.0%, with phase-out to 0% by 2030), Pennsylvania (9.99% → 7.49%, scheduled to 4.99% by 2031), Indiana (8.5% → 4.9%), Iowa (top rate 12% → 7.1%), Louisiana (8% → 5.5%), and the District of Columbia (9.975% → 8.25%). Several states substantially restructured their regimes, including Michigan's replacement of the Michigan Business Tax with a flat corporate income tax in 2012.

=== State conformity to OBBBA ===
The OBBBA's expansion of immediate expensing and other OBBBA-specific federal changes propagate to state corporate income tax bases unevenly. The principal conformity-architecture distinctions are:

- Rolling conformity states (e.g., New York, Illinois, Pennsylvania, Massachusetts, Connecticut, the District of Columbia) generally adopt the Internal Revenue Code as in effect on the date of computation, automatically incorporating most OBBBA changes absent specific decoupling.
- Fixed-date (static) conformity states (e.g., California, Florida, Georgia, North Carolina, Texas (for the margin tax), Virginia) conform to the IRC as of a specified date and must take legislative action to update their conformity dates; until they do so, the OBBBA provisions are not effective for state purposes.
- Selective conformity states (e.g., Arkansas, Mississippi) conform on a section-by-section basis.

Even rolling conformity states frequently decouple from specific federal provisions. Several states have announced or considered decoupling from OBBBA's principal expansion provisions:

- 26 U.S.C. § 174A (immediate domestic R&E expensing). California has historically decoupled from federal §174 amortization; California, Mississippi, and Tennessee continue to require capitalization-and-amortization for state purposes, irrespective of the OBBBA's restoration of expensing.
- 26 U.S.C. §§ 168–k (100% bonus depreciation). A long-standing majority of states (including California, Florida, New Jersey, New York, North Carolina, Pennsylvania, and Texas) decouple wholly or partially from federal bonus depreciation. The OBBBA's restoration of permanent 100% bonus depreciation does not change those decouplings absent further state legislation.
- 26 U.S.C. §§ 168–n (qualified production property). Because §168(n) is new, most states have not affirmatively conformed. State decoupling treatment remains under review in most jurisdictions as of May 2026.
- 26 U.S.C. §§ 163–j (EBITDA-based ATI). Several states (including Connecticut, Georgia, Indiana, Tennessee, Wisconsin) historically decoupled from the federal §163(j) limitation altogether or used an EBIT-basis computation. The OBBBA's permanent restoration of EBITDA-based ATI does not automatically apply for these states.
- NCTI and FDDEI (formerly GILTI and FDII). Approximately half of CIT states require partial inclusion of NCTI in the state tax base; a smaller number conform to the §250 deduction or its FDDEI counterpart. Texas, by amendment to 34 TAC §3.587 effective March 1, 2026, includes NCTI and FDDEI in the margin-tax revenue base and does not allow the §250 deduction.

=== Texas franchise (margin) tax ===
Although Texas has no corporate income tax, the state imposes the franchise tax (the "margin tax") on most business entities (including corporations, limited liability companies, partnerships other than general partnerships of natural persons, and business trusts) for the privilege of doing business in Texas under Tex. Tax Code Ch. 171.

Tax is imposed on the lowest of:

- total revenue × 70%;
- total revenue – cost of goods sold (COGS, as defined by §171.1012);
- total revenue – compensation (capped at $480,000 per person for 2026 reports); or
- total revenue – $1 million (the "$1 million deduction" alternative).

The standard rate is 0.75% of taxable margin; entities "primarily engaged in retail or wholesale trade" pay 0.375%. An entity qualifies for the reduced 0.375% rate only if (1) revenue from retail or wholesale trade exceeds revenue from other trades, (2) less than 50% of the retail/wholesale revenue comes from products produced by the entity or an affiliated group member (with an exception for Major Group 58 "Eating and Drinking Places"), and (3) the entity does not provide retail/wholesale utilities, including telecommunications, electricity, or gas. An entity with annualized total revenue of $20 million or less may elect the EZ Computation at a 0.331% rate, in lieu of statutory deductions and credits.

Texas Senate Bill 3 (2023) raised the no-tax-due threshold to $2.47 million for reports originally due on or after January 1, 2024, with a further increase to $2.65 million for 2026 and 2027 reports. Entities at or below the threshold owe no franchise tax and, effective January 1, 2024, are no longer required to file a No Tax Due report (Form 05-163), although they must still file a Public Information Report (Form 05-102) or Ownership Information Report (Form 05-167).

The COGS deduction under §171.1012 is restricted to the cost of acquiring or producing tangible personal property (and limited categories of computer programs); intangibles, services, and most rentals are excluded. Effective March 1, 2026, the Comptroller's amended rule (34 TAC §3.587) ties total revenue to the current Internal Revenue Code (rather than the 2007 IRC) for many provisions, while retaining 2007 IRC conformity for the foreign-dividend and royalty exclusions—meaning that NCTI and FDDEI are included in Texas total revenue and the federal §250 deduction is not allowed.

=== Puerto Rico and U.S. territories ===
Puerto Rico administers its own income tax system under the Puerto Rico Internal Revenue Code, separate from the U.S. federal system, and is not a "state" for purposes of the federal state-level corporate income tax discussion. Corporations organized under Puerto Rico law are foreign corporations for U.S. federal income tax purposes, although bona fide residents of Puerto Rico are generally exempt from U.S. tax on Puerto Rico-source income under 26 U.S.C. § 933. The Puerto Rico Incentives Code (Act 60-2019) consolidated a series of earlier incentives (including the former Act 20 export-services and Act 22 individual-investor regimes) and offers reduced corporate rates—4% for qualifying export-services and certain other businesses—and a 0% rate on qualifying interest, dividends, and capital gains for new individual resident beneficiaries.

In June 2025, the Puerto Rican Senate approved House Bill 505, which imposes a 4% tax on new individual beneficiaries under Act 60-2019. The measure formed part of a broader legislative review of Puerto Rico's tax-incentive regime in response to public debate over whether the program had delivered measurable benefits to the local economy. The U.S. Virgin Islands, Guam, the Commonwealth of the Northern Mariana Islands, and American Samoa administer "mirror code" income tax systems modeled on the Internal Revenue Code with limited statutory modifications.

== Tax revenue and effective rates ==
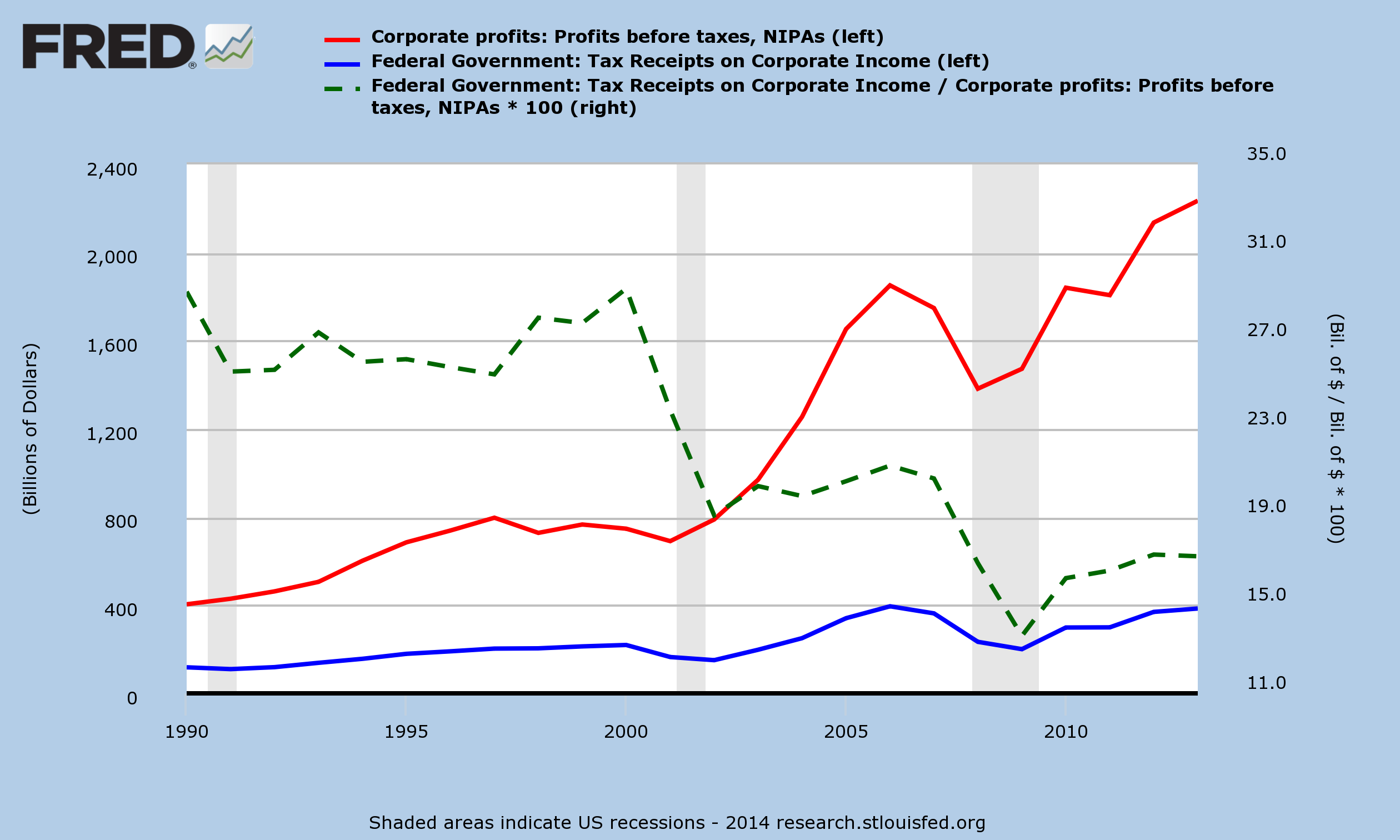
U.S. federal corporate income tax receipts and pre-tax profits, 1947–2014. (Data through 2014; for current revenue figures see the table below.)

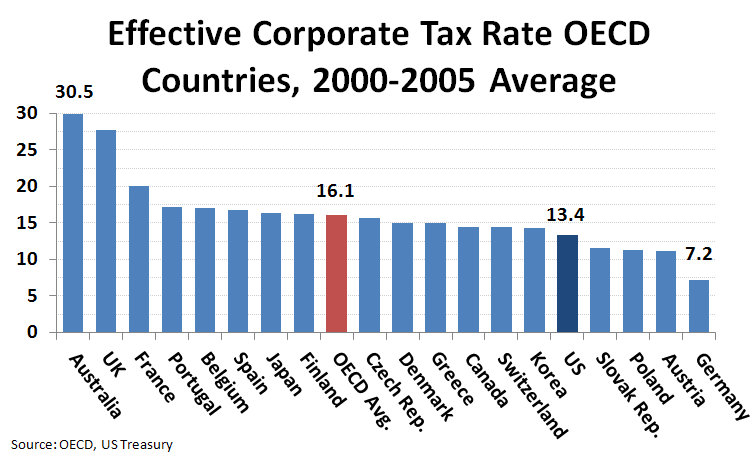
Effective corporate tax rate for OECD countries averaged between 2000 and 2005 (historical reference). The effective tax rate equals corporate taxes divided by corporate surplus. For current effective-rate data see the methodological discussion below.

Federal corporate income tax receipts have varied substantially over time:

| Fiscal year | Corporate income tax receipts ($ billions) | Share of total federal receipts | Approximate share of GDP |
|---|---|---|---|
| 2010 | 191.4 | 8.9% | 1.3% |
| 2017 (last full pre-TCJA year) | 297.0 | 9.0% | 1.5% |
| 2019 (first full post-TCJA year) | 230.2 | 6.6% | 1.1% |
| 2021 | 372.0 | 9.0% | 1.6% |
| 2022 | 425.0 | 8.7% | 1.7% |
| 2023 | 420.0 | 9.4% | 1.6% |
| 2024 | 529.9 | 10.8% | 1.84% |
| 2025 | 452.1 | 8.6% | ≈1.5% |

Source: U.S. Treasury, Combined Statement of Receipts; Congressional Budget Office, Monthly Budget Review. The decline in FY 2025 receipts (–14.7% year-over-year) is attributable in significant part to OBBBA's restoration of immediate domestic R&E expensing and 100% bonus depreciation, both of which apply retroactively to assets placed in service after January 19, 2025 and to research expenses incurred in tax years beginning after December 31, 2024.

Comparison with macroeconomic measures of corporate profitability provides further context. The Bureau of Economic Analysis reported that U.S. corporate profits before tax (with inventory valuation and capital consumption adjustments) reached approximately $4.08 trillion in calendar year 2025. The ratio of federal corporate income tax receipts to BEA before-tax corporate profits is sometimes used as a rough macroeconomic effective tax rate, although this measure conflates several distinct concepts: it mixes statutory corporate income tax (computed on tax-return income) with profits earned by pass-through entities (which are not subject to corporate-level tax), with profits of REITs and RICs (taxed only at the owner level), and with profits of foreign-source operations subject to NCTI/Subpart F rather than the regular 21% rate. The IRS requires large corporations to reconcile financial-statement income with taxable income on Schedule M-3, but no comparable reconciliation exists at the macroeconomic level. Readers should therefore exercise caution interpreting any single chart that combines statutory rates, tax collections, and book profits without explicit methodological disclosure.

The Institute on Taxation and Economic Policy reported in May 2026 that at least 88 large profitable U.S. corporations paid no federal income tax for 2025, citing OBBBA's R&E expensing, 100% bonus depreciation, and expanded FDDEI deduction as principal contributors.

=== Historical tax expenditures ===
Pre-TCJA corporate tax expenditures were dominated by a small number of high-dollar provisions. The Joint Committee on Taxation tabulated the largest corporate tax expenditures over the five-year period 2005–2009 as follows.

Largest corporate tax expenditures, 2005–2009
| Provision | Total ($ billions, 2005–2009) |
|---|---|
| Depreciation of equipment in excess of the alternative depreciation system | 71.3 |
| Exclusion of interest on public-purpose state and local government debt | 38.3 |
| Inventory property sales source rule exception | 30.9 |
| Expensing of research and experimental expenditures | 28.5 |
| Deferral of active income of controlled foreign corporations | 25.8 |
| Reduced rates on the first $10 million of corporate taxable income | 23.7 |
| §199 deduction for income attributable to domestic production activities | 19.8 |
| Low-income housing tax credit | 17.5 |
| Exclusion of investment income on life insurance and annuity contracts | 12.8 |
| §41 tax credit for qualified research expenditures | 10.7 |

Several of the listed provisions have since been repealed or restructured. The §199 domestic production activities deduction was repealed by TCJA; the reduced rates on the first $10 million of corporate taxable income were eliminated by TCJA's flat 21% rate; the deferral of CFC active income was substantially curtailed by the 26 U.S.C. § 951A NCTI regime; and §174 R&E expensing was first eliminated for tax years beginning after December 31, 2021 (under TCJA) and subsequently restored for domestic R&E by the OBBBA's new 26 U.S.C. § 174A, effective for tax years beginning after December 31, 2024. The exclusion of interest on public-purpose state and local bonds and the LIHTC remain materially unchanged.

=== International comparison ===
For cross-country comparison, corporate income tax revenue is typically measured against gross domestic product. The following table reproduces 2024 figures from the OECD's Revenue Statistics 2024 (which compiles 2022 reporting-year data, the most recent commonly available cross-country comparable). The U.S. figure of 1.84% reflects FY2024 actuals from the Treasury Combined Statement; the 2022 figure on the OECD-comparable basis was approximately 1.7%.

Corporate income tax as a share of GDP, OECD comparison (2024 Revenue Statistics)
| Country | Corporate tax / GDP |
|---|---|
| United States | 1.84% (FY2024 actuals) |
| Germany | 2.3% |
| France | 2.7% |
| United Kingdom | 3.5% |
| Canada | 4.5% |
| Korea (South) | 4.0% |
| Japan | 4.1% |
| Australia | 5.5% |
| OECD average | ≈3.0% |

The cross-country comparison is complicated by definitional differences: jurisdictions vary in their treatment of pass-through income, in the scope of "corporate" entities, and in whether non-income business taxes (e.g., the French CVAE, the German trade tax, or U.S. state-level franchise and gross-receipts taxes) are classified as corporate income taxes for OECD purposes.

== Taxable income ==
Determinations of what is taxable and at what rate are made at the federal level based on U.S. tax law. Many but not all states incorporate federal law principles in their tax laws to some extent. Federal taxable income equals gross income (gross receipts and other income less cost of goods sold) less tax deductions. Gross income of a corporation and business deductions are determined in much the same manner as for individuals. All income of a corporation is subject to the same federal tax rate. However, corporations may reduce other federal taxable income by a net capital loss and certain deductions are more limited. Certain deductions are available only to corporations. These include the dividends received deduction and amortization of organization expenses. Some states tax business income of a corporation differently from non-business income.

Principles for recognizing income and deductions may differ from financial accounting principles. Key areas of difference include differences in the timing of income or deduction, tax exemption for certain income, and disallowance or limitation of certain tax deductions. IRS rules require that these differences be disclosed in considerable detail for non-small corporations on Schedule M-3 to Form 1120.

The OBBBA significantly modified the deduction rules for research and experimental expenditures, depreciation, and interest expense; these rules are summarized below.

=== Research and experimental expenditures (§174 / §174A) ===
The TCJA had required taxpayers to capitalize and amortize specified research or experimental ("R&E") expenditures over five years (15 years for foreign R&E) for tax years beginning after December 31, 2021. The OBBBA (§70302) restored immediate expensing for domestic R&E expenditures by enacting a new 26 U.S.C. § 174A, effective for tax years beginning after December 31, 2024.

Under §174A:

- Taxpayers may deduct domestic R&E expenditures (including software development costs, made permanent) immediately or, alternatively, capitalize them and amortize over a period of not less than 60 months, or over a 10-year period under 26 U.S.C. §§ 59–e.
- Foreign R&E expenditures continue to be capitalized and amortized over 15 years under §174.
- 26 U.S.C. § 280C was modified to require that domestic R&E expenditures deducted or capitalized under §174A be reduced by the §41 research credit (or, alternatively, the credit may be reduced under §280C(c)(2)).

The OBBBA's transition rules permit:

- All taxpayers to elect to fully deduct unamortized 2022–2024 capitalized R&E in the first tax year beginning after December 31, 2024, or split the deduction equally between 2025 and 2026 (filed as a change of accounting method on Form 3115); and
- "Eligible small business taxpayers" (those with average annual gross receipts ≤ $31 million for the three years preceding 2025) to retroactively amend returns for 2022–2024 to immediately expense domestic R&E. Amended returns must be filed by July 4, 2026.

=== Depreciation: 100% bonus depreciation and qualified production property ===
The OBBBA (§70301) permanently restored 100% bonus depreciation for qualified property under 26 U.S.C. §§ 168–k acquired and placed in service after January 19, 2025. The provision reverses the TCJA-era phase-down (which had reduced bonus depreciation to 40% for property placed in service in 2025 and would have eliminated it by 2027). Eligible property generally includes tangible MACRS property with a class life of 20 years or less, computer software, and qualified improvement property.

OBBBA §70307 also enacted new 26 U.S.C. §§ 168–n, providing a 100% special depreciation allowance for "qualified production property" (QPP)—non-residential real property used as an integral part of a "qualified production activity" (manufacturing, agricultural and chemical production, or refining of "qualified products," meaning tangible personal property other than food or beverages prepared and sold in the same retail establishment). To qualify, the property must:

- have construction begin after January 19, 2025, and before January 1, 2029;
- be placed in service in the United States after July 4, 2025, and before January 1, 2031;
- have its original use commence with the taxpayer (or meet a special "previously unused" rule); and
- be used as an integral part of a QPA, with portions used for offices, administration, lodging, parking, sales, R&D, software development, or engineering excluded from QPP.

A 10-year recapture rule under §1245 applies if the property ceases to be used in a qualified production activity. The IRS issued interim guidance in Notice 2026-16 (February 20, 2026) addressing definitions of "manufacturing," "production," and "refining," safe harbors based on NAICS codes (sectors 31–33 and 111–112), allocation methods between eligible and ineligible portions of property, and a 95% de minimis rule.

The 26 U.S.C. § 179 expensing limit was also increased: the maximum deduction was raised from $1 million to $2.5 million, with the phaseout threshold raised from $2.5 million to $4 million, for tax years beginning after 2024 (both indexed for inflation thereafter).

=== Debt versus equity characterization ===
The deductibility of payments labeled as "interest" depends on the characterization of the underlying instrument as debt rather than equity. The statutory framework for this characterization is set out in 26 U.S.C. § 385, but operative authority remains largely case-law-based. Courts have applied a multifactor test, frequently described as comprising approximately 26 factors, with no single factor controlling. Important factors include the form and name of the instrument; the presence of a fixed maturity date and interest rate; the right to enforce payment; subordination to other creditors; the corporation's debt-to-equity ratio; the identity of holders relative to equity holders; the intent of the parties; "thin capitalization"; and whether interest is in fact paid on schedule. Payments characterized as interest on debt are generally deductible (subject to 26 U.S.C. §§ 163–j and other limitations), while distributions on equity are not deductible at the corporate level.

=== Interest deduction limitation (§163(j)) ===
26 U.S.C. §§ 163–j, as amended by TCJA, limits a taxpayer's deduction for net business interest to the sum of business interest income, floor-plan financing interest, and 30% of adjusted taxable income (ATI). For tax years beginning after December 31, 2017 and before January 1, 2022, ATI was determined essentially as a tax-basis EBITDA. For 2022–2024, ATI was determined on an EBIT basis (without adding back depreciation, amortization, or depletion), substantially tightening the limitation.

OBBBA §70303 permanently restored the EBITDA-based ATI computation, effective for tax years beginning after December 31, 2024. The OBBBA also:

- expanded the floor-plan financing interest definition to include certain trailers and campers;
- effective for tax years beginning after December 31, 2025, excluded Subpart F inclusions, NCTI inclusions under §951A, §956 inclusions, §78 gross-up, and certain §245A deductions from ATI;
- effective for tax years beginning after December 31, 2025, eliminated the strategy of electively capitalizing interest under §263(g) or §263A(f) to escape §163(j), by clarifying that such capitalized amounts retain their character as interest subject to §163(j); and
- preserved the small-business exception (§448(c)) for taxpayers (other than tax shelters) with average annual gross receipts of $31 million or less for 2025.

The IRS issued Fact Sheet 2025-9 (December 23, 2025) and Rev. Proc. 2026-17 (early 2026) implementing the changes; Rev. Proc. 2026-17 also permits real-property and farming taxpayers that previously made the §163(j)(7) election out of the limitation to withdraw that election.

=== Net operating losses ===
A net operating loss (NOL) generally arises when a corporation's allowable deductions exceed its gross income. Under 26 U.S.C. § 172, NOLs may offset taxable income in other years.

For NOLs arising in tax years beginning before January 1, 2018, NOLs were generally permitted to be carried back two years and forward 20 years and could fully offset taxable income in the year of use. The TCJA significantly limited NOL utilization for losses arising in tax years beginning after December 31, 2017:

- The two-year carryback was generally eliminated (with exceptions for certain farming losses and non-life insurance company losses).
- The 20-year carryforward was replaced with an indefinite carryforward.
- NOLs may only offset 80% of taxable income (computed without regard to the NOL deduction) in any given year.

The CARES Act of 2020 temporarily restored a five-year carryback for NOLs arising in 2018, 2019, and 2020 and removed the 80% limitation for those years. These relaxations expired for tax years beginning after December 31, 2020. NOL utilization is also limited following an "ownership change" under 26 U.S.C. § 382, which caps the loss corporation's pre-change NOL usage at an annual amount equal to the value of the loss corporation immediately before the change multiplied by the long-term tax-exempt rate.

== International tax provisions ==
The TCJA shifted the U.S. corporate tax system from a worldwide-with-deferral regime to a "quasi-territorial" hybrid system. Although a 100% dividends received deduction under 26 U.S.C. § 245A effectively exempts most foreign-source dividends received by 10%-or-greater U.S. corporate shareholders of a foreign corporation, several anti-deferral and anti-abuse regimes (Subpart F, NCTI, BEAT, and §959 previously taxed earnings rules) substantially limit the territorial character of the system.

=== Pre-TCJA deferral regime ===
Before the 2017 reforms, U.S. multinational corporations were generally not required to pay U.S. tax on the active business earnings of their foreign subsidiaries until those earnings were repatriated to the United States as a dividend ("deferral"). Combined with a 35% statutory rate, deferral was widely criticized for incentivizing the accumulation of low-taxed earnings offshore and the use of subsidiaries in tax havens and financial-privacy jurisdictions. The United States Government Accountability Office reported in December 2008 that 83 of the 100 largest U.S. publicly traded corporations maintained subsidiaries in jurisdictions listed as tax havens or financial-privacy jurisdictions. U.S. corporations were observed to report disproportionate shares of worldwide profits in low-tax jurisdictions such as the Netherlands, Luxembourg, Ireland, and Bermuda, in excess of those jurisdictions' shares of the corporations' actual economic activity.

A 2012 review by the United States Senate Permanent Subcommittee on Investigations tabulated the largest deferred foreign cash balances then held by U.S. multinationals.

U.S. companies with deferred foreign cash balances greater than $5 billion (2012)
| Company | Total cash ($B) | Foreign cash ($B) | Foreign as % of total |
|---|---|---|---|
| Apple | 110.2 | 74.0 | 67% |
| Microsoft | 59.5 | 50.0 | 89% |
| General Electric | 83.7 | >41.9 | >50% |
| Cisco | 46.7 | 41.7 | 89% |
| Google | 49.3 | 25.7 | 48% |
| Oracle | 29.7 | 25.1 | 84% |
| Johnson & Johnson | 24.5 | 24.5 | 100% |
| Pfizer | 24.0 | ~19.2 | ~80% |
| Amgen | 19.4 | 16.6 | 82% |
| Qualcomm | 26.6 | 16.5 | 62% |
| Coca-Cola | 15.8 | >13.9 | >88% |
| Dell | 13.9 | ~11.8 | ~85% |
| Merck | 19.5 | >9.2 | >47% |
| Medtronic | 8.9 | 8.3 | 93% |
| Hewlett-Packard | 8.1 | ~8.1 | ~100% |
| eBay | 8.0 | 7.0 | 88% |
| Wal-Mart | 6.6 | 5.6 | 85% |

TCJA's one-time mandatory repatriation tax under 26 U.S.C. § 965 (discussed in § Mandatory Repatriation Tax below) was designed to draw these accumulated post-1986 untaxed earnings into the U.S. tax base on a backward-looking basis (15.5% on cash and equivalents and 8% on non-cash assets), while 26 U.S.C. § 245A and 26 U.S.C. § 951A together replaced the deferral incentive on a prospective basis.

=== Net CFC Tested Income (NCTI; formerly GILTI) ===
26 U.S.C. § 951A requires a U.S. shareholder of any controlled foreign corporation (CFC) to include in gross income its pro rata share of the CFC's net tested income (originally called Global Intangible Low-Taxed Income (GILTI)). The OBBBA renamed the regime "Net CFC Tested Income" (NCTI) and made several material changes effective for tax years beginning after December 31, 2025.

The principal NCTI changes include:

- the 26 U.S.C. § 250 deduction was permanently set at 40% (down from 50% pre-OBBBA, but higher than the 37.5% rate scheduled to take effect in 2026), producing an effective minimum tax of 12.6% on NCTI before foreign tax credits (≈14% after the foreign tax credit "haircut");
- the 10% qualified business asset investment (QBAI) routine return exclusion was eliminated, so all CFC tested income (including the return on tangible assets) is captured;
- the §960(d) foreign tax credit "haircut" was reduced from 20% to 10% (i.e., 90% of CFC-level foreign taxes are creditable);
- interest expense and R&E expenditures are no longer apportioned to NCTI for purposes of the foreign tax credit limitation; and
- a U.S. shareholder must include its pro rata share of NCTI for any portion of a CFC's tax year during which the shareholder owned the stock, not solely on the last day of the year.

=== Foreign-Derived Deduction Eligible Income (FDDEI; formerly FDII) ===
26 U.S.C. § 250's deduction for foreign-derived intangible income (FDII), which provides a reduced effective rate on certain foreign-derived income earned by U.S. corporations, was renamed "Foreign-Derived Deduction Eligible Income" (FDDEI) by OBBBA. The deduction was permanently set at 33.34% (down from 37.5% but higher than the 21.875% scheduled in 2026), producing an effective tax rate of 14% on FDDEI. The 10% QBAI return on net tangible assets was eliminated; income from sales or deemed dispositions (including §367(d) outbound transfers) of depreciable or intangible property occurring after June 16, 2025 is excluded from "deduction eligible income"; and interest expense and R&E expenditures are excluded from allocable deductions. The OBBBA also permits up to 50% of taxable income from the sale of U.S.-produced inventory through a foreign office or fixed place of business to be sourced as foreign income, expanding §904 foreign tax credit limitation capacity.

The combined OBBBA international changes are projected by the Penn Wharton Budget Model to reduce corporate tax revenue by approximately $276 billion over ten years on a conventional basis.

=== Subpart F ===
26 U.S.C. § 951–26 U.S.C. § 965 continue to require U.S. shareholders to include certain categories of CFC income (including foreign personal holding company income, foreign base company sales income, and foreign base company services income) currently in income, regardless of distribution. The OBBBA permanently extended the §954(c)(6) "look-through" rule excluding certain related-CFC dividends, interest, rents, and royalties from foreign personal holding company income. The OBBBA also restored the §958(b)(4) downward attribution exception (limiting CFC classification expansion that had occurred under TCJA) but added a new 26 U.S.C. § 951B targeting "foreign-controlled CFC groups."

In Whirlpool Financial Corp. v. Commissioner, 19 F.4th 944 (6th Cir. 2021), cert. denied, 143 S. Ct. 102 (2022), the Sixth Circuit affirmed the U.S. Tax Court's holding that income earned by a Luxembourg CFC through a Mexican manufacturing branch was foreign base company sales income under the §954(d)(2) "branch rule," even where the regulatory manufacturing exception arguably would have applied. The decision generated substantial controversy among tax practitioners.

=== Mandatory Repatriation Tax (§965) and Moore v. United States ===
The TCJA's transition to the new international regime imposed a one-time mandatory repatriation tax (MRT) under 26 U.S.C. § 965 on accumulated post-1986 deferred earnings of certain "specified foreign corporations" of U.S. shareholders, taxed at 15.5% (cash) or 8% (other) and payable over up to eight years. The §965 transition tax brought approximately $2.6 trillion of accumulated foreign earnings into the U.S. tax base.

In Moore v. United States, 602 U.S. ___ (2024), the U.S. Supreme Court, in a 7–2 decision authored by Justice Kavanaugh, upheld the MRT against the taxpayer's challenge that it violated the Direct Tax Clause and the Sixteenth Amendment's purported realization requirement. The Court held that Congress may attribute an entity's realized and undistributed income to the entity's shareholders or partners and tax those persons on that income, consistent with longstanding precedent. The opinion expressly declined to resolve whether realization is constitutionally required for an income tax, leaving open broader constitutional questions about wealth taxes and similar proposals.

=== Foreign tax credit ===
26 U.S.C. § 901 and 26 U.S.C. § 904 allow U.S. taxpayers a non-refundable foreign tax credit against U.S. tax liability for income taxes paid to foreign countries, subject to per-category ("basket") limitations. Following TCJA and OBBBA, the principal baskets are: passive category, general category, branch category, NCTI (formerly GILTI) category, foreign-source taxable income with respect to certain prior-year separate categories, and treaty resourcing. The OBBBA permits up to 50% of the taxable income from sales of U.S.-produced inventory through a foreign office to be treated as foreign source for foreign tax credit limitation purposes (effective for tax years beginning after December 31, 2025).

=== §245A and economic substance ===
26 U.S.C. § 245A's 100% participation exemption for the foreign-source portion of dividends received by 10%-or-greater U.S. corporate shareholders of "specified 10-percent owned foreign corporations" remains a central feature of the post-TCJA international regime. In Liberty Global, Inc. v. United States, 110 F.4th 1257 (10th Cir. 2024), a divided Tenth Circuit affirmed the District of Colorado's application of the codified economic substance doctrine under 26 U.S.C. §§ 7701–o to disallow a §245A deduction obtained through a multi-step internal restructuring (codenamed "Project Soy") that exploited a transitional gap between TCJA's §965 and §951A inclusions and the §245A DRD. The court held that taxpayers' "mechanical[] utiliz[ation] [of] the provisions of the Tax Code to obtain a benefit not intended by Congress" can be disregarded even where each step is a "basic" tax-recognition election such as a check-the-box election.

The codified economic substance doctrine under §7701(o), enacted by the Health Care and Education Reconciliation Act of 2010, requires that a transaction (1) change the taxpayer's economic position in a meaningful way (apart from federal income tax effects) and (2) have a substantial purpose (apart from federal income tax effects). A 20% accuracy-related penalty under 26 U.S.C. §§ 6662–b applies to any underpayment attributable to a transaction lacking economic substance, increasing to 40% for an undisclosed transaction; the reasonable cause defense generally available for other accuracy penalties does not apply.

=== Corporate inversions (§7874) ===
26 U.S.C. § 7874, originally enacted by the American Jobs Creation Act of 2004 and substantially expanded by Treasury regulations issued in 2014–2016, addresses corporate inversions by treating a foreign acquiring corporation as a U.S. corporation when former shareholders of the inverted U.S. corporation own 80% or more of the foreign acquirer (and limiting certain tax benefits at the 60% threshold). The Trump administration has not materially modified the §7874 regulatory regime, although the OBBBA's reduction of the FDDEI rate is widely viewed as reducing taxpayer incentives to invert.

=== Pillar Two and the side-by-side agreement ===
The United States has not enacted legislation implementing the OECD/G20 Pillar Two Global Anti-Base Erosion (GloBE) rules, although it remains a participant in the Inclusive Framework. On January 20, 2025, President Donald Trump issued an executive order declaring that prior U.S. commitments regarding the global tax deal had "no force or effect" within the United States. An early version of the OBBBA had included a proposed 26 U.S.C. § 899 retaliatory tax that would have imposed up to 15 additional percentage points of U.S. tax on persons connected to jurisdictions with digital services taxes, diverted profits taxes, or the Pillar Two undertaxed profits rule (UTPR).

On June 26–28, 2025, U.S. Treasury Secretary Scott Bessent announced an agreement among the G7 finance ministers under which:

- U.S.-parented multinational groups would be fully excluded from the Pillar Two Income Inclusion Rule (IIR) and Undertaxed Profits Rule (UTPR) with respect to both their domestic and foreign profits, on the basis that the U.S. NCTI/CAMT/BEAT regime constitutes a comparable minimum tax;
- the United States would withdraw the proposed §899 retaliatory tax (which was duly removed from the enacted version of the OBBBA); and
- the OECD would deliver simplifications to the Pillar Two compliance framework and consider changes to the Pillar Two treatment of substance-based non-refundable tax credits.

On January 5, 2026, the OECD/G20 Inclusive Framework released the "side-by-side package," operationalizing the G7 understanding. The package introduces (i) a "side-by-side safe harbor" deeming the U.S. tax system compliant with Pillar Two for U.S.-parented groups, with both IIR and UTPR treated as zero (a qualified domestic minimum top-up tax (QDMTT) may still apply at the local level); (ii) a UPE safe harbor; (iii) a permanent simplified ETR safe harbor; (iv) a substance-based tax incentive safe harbor; and (v) a one-year extension of the transitional country-by-country reporting safe harbor. Several Inclusive Framework jurisdictions and members of the U.S. Congress have stated that legislative §899-style retaliatory measures could be revived if signatories fail to implement the agreement faithfully.

=== Foreign corporations operating in the United States ===
The United States taxes foreign (non-U.S.) corporations differently than domestic corporations. Foreign corporations generally are taxed only on income that is "effectively connected" with the conduct of a U.S. trade or business (ECI), under 26 U.S.C. § 882, taxed at the regular 21% corporate rate. Foreign corporations with a U.S. branch are also subject to the branch profits tax under 26 U.S.C. § 884, intended to mimic the dividend withholding tax that would apply if the U.S. business were conducted through a U.S. subsidiary. The tax applies at a statutory 30% rate to the corporation's "dividend equivalent amount" (DEA) for the year, defined as the foreign corporation's effectively connected earnings and profits, reduced by net increases in its U.S. net equity (broadly, money plus the adjusted basis of property connected with the U.S. trade or business) and increased by net decreases. Tax is imposed whether or not any actual distribution is made. The 30% rate is generally reduced to 5% (or eliminated entirely) under most modern U.S. income tax treaties, subject to satisfaction of the applicable limitation on benefits article.

In addition, foreign corporations are subject to a 30% gross-basis withholding tax under §§1441/1442 on certain U.S.-source FDAP (fixed, determinable, annual, or periodical) income—including dividends, interest, royalties, and rents—not effectively connected with a U.S. trade or business. Tax treaties frequently reduce or eliminate this withholding. The 30% rate is collected by withholding agents and reported on Form 1042 and Forms 1042-S. A separate 30% withholding regime under Chapter 4 of the Code (FATCA, §§1471–1474) applies to certain payments to foreign financial institutions and non-financial foreign entities that fail to comply with FATCA's information reporting requirements.

== Distributions ==
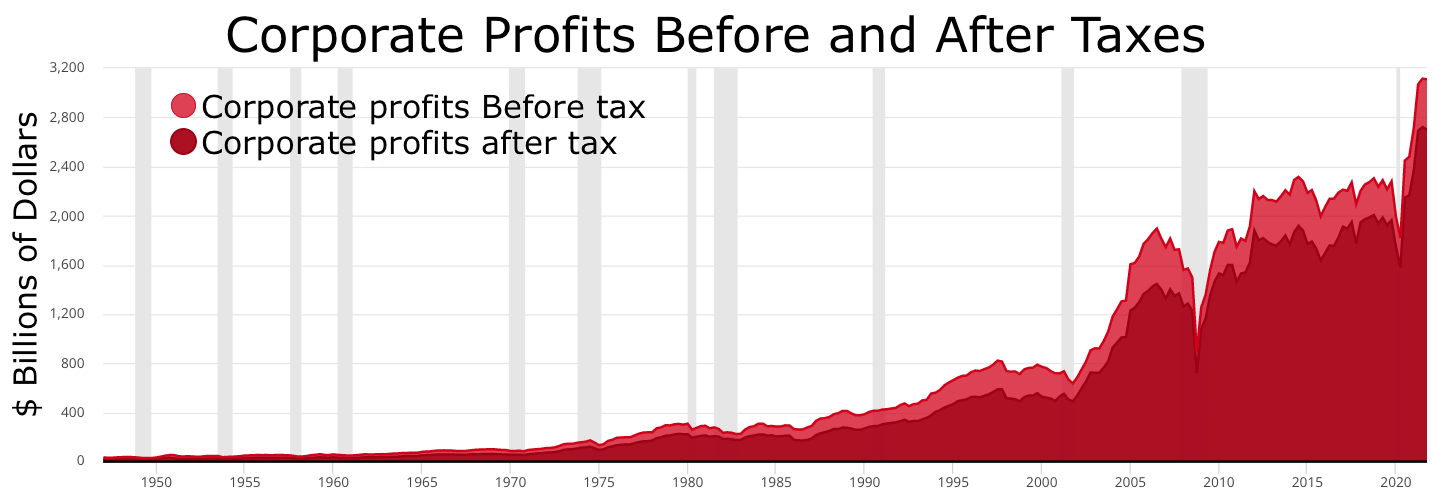
Corporate profits before and after taxes

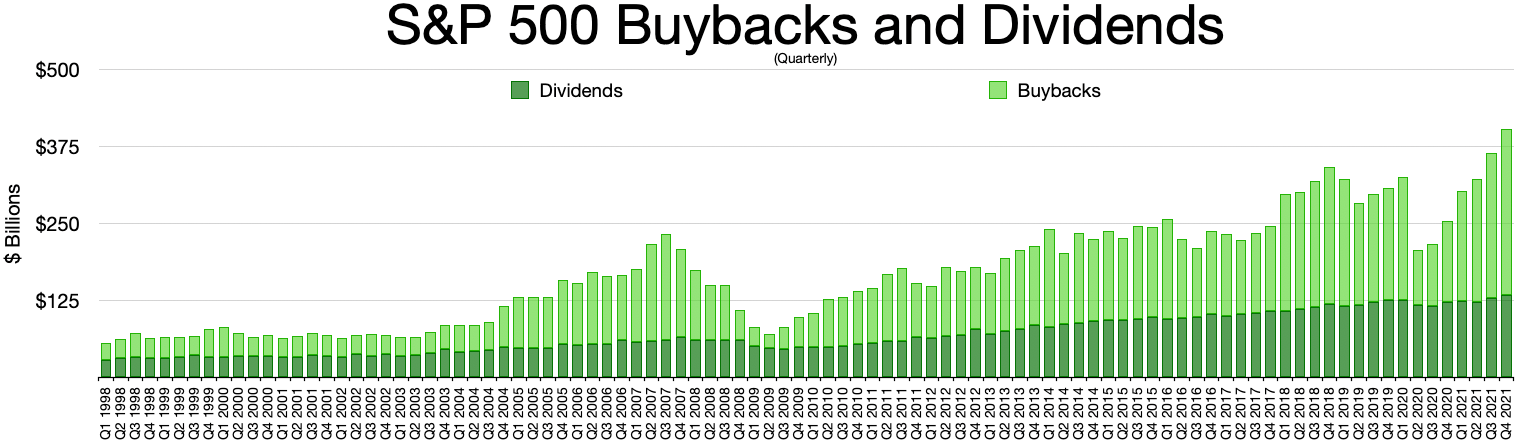
S&P 500 buybacks and dividends (quarterly) Stock buyback Dividends

Shareholders of corporations are subject to corporate or individual income tax when corporate earnings are distributed. Such distribution of earnings is generally referred to as a dividend. Dividends received by other corporations may be taxed at reduced rates, or exempt from taxation, if the dividends received deduction applies. Dividends received by individuals (if the dividend is a "qualified dividend") are taxed at reduced rates of 0%, 15%, or 20% depending on the individual's adjusted gross income. 26 U.S.C. § 245A provides a 100% deduction for the foreign-source portion of dividends received from "specified 10-percent owned foreign corporations" by domestic corporate shareholders, subject to a one-year holding period under §246.

The amount and timing of deductions for corporate income tax purposes is determined under the earnings and profits (E&P) regime (26 U.S.C. § 316, 26 U.S.C. § 312). To the extent of E&P, distributions are dividends; distributions in excess of E&P are first treated as a tax-free recovery of basis and thereafter as gain from the sale of stock. There are limited exceptions to this rule.

Corporations may distribute property other than cash to their shareholders. Such a distribution is generally treated as a sale of the property at fair market value, with the corporation recognizing gain (but not loss) under 26 U.S.C. §§ 311–b.

Liquidation of a corporation is generally treated as an exchange of a capital asset under 26 U.S.C. § 331. If a shareholder bought stock for $300 and receives $500 worth of property from a corporation in a liquidation, that shareholder would recognize a capital gain of $200. An exception is when a parent corporation liquidates a subsidiary, which is tax-free so long as the parent owns more than 80% of the subsidiary under 26 U.S.C. § 332. Certain transactions between group members may not be recognized until the occurrence of events for other members. For example, if Company A sells goods to sister Company B, the profit on the sale is deferred until Company B uses or sells the goods. All members of a consolidated group must use the same tax year.

== Nontaxable corporate events ==
U.S. tax law provides that certain corporate events are nontaxable to the corporation, its shareholders, or both, subject to significant restrictions and special rules. These nonrecognition provisions are concentrated at the federal level and are generally followed (with some modifications) by the states.

=== Formation ===
The formation of a corporation by controlling corporate or non-corporate shareholders is generally a nontaxable event under 26 U.S.C. § 351. The tax attributes of contributed assets and assumed liabilities generally carry over to the new corporation under 26 U.S.C. § 362.

Example. John and Mary, U.S. resident individuals operating an unincorporated business, decide to incorporate. They transfer the business's assets, subject to its accrued liabilities, to Newco — a newly formed Delaware corporation of which they are the sole shareholders — solely in exchange for Newco common shares. The transfer generally does not cause gain or loss recognition to John, Mary, or Newco under §351, and Newco takes John and Mary's tax basis in the contributed assets under §362. If, however, Newco also assumes a bank loan in excess of the basis of the contributed assets less the accrued liabilities, John and Mary recognize taxable gain to the extent of the excess under 26 U.S.C. §§ 357–c.

=== Acquisitive reorganizations ===
Corporations may merge or acquire other corporations on a nontaxable basis to either the corporations or their shareholders under 26 U.S.C. § 368 and the associated nonrecognition provisions of 26 U.S.C. § 354–26 U.S.C. § 362. Each statutory reorganization type imposes restrictions on consideration, continuity of interest, continuity of business enterprise, and business purpose.

Example. Bigco acquires all of the outstanding stock of Smallco from Smallco's shareholders solely in exchange for Bigco voting stock. If the §368(a)(1)(B) requirements are satisfied (including the "solely for voting stock" requirement), the acquisition is nontaxable to Smallco and to Smallco's shareholders, even if Smallco is subsequently liquidated into Bigco or merged upstream into Bigco in a transaction qualifying under §368(a)(1)(D).

=== Other reorganizations ===
Corporations may also alter their legal identity, capitalization, or jurisdiction of organization on a nontaxable basis. Common examples include statutory mergers (26 U.S.C. §§ 368–a), liquidations of 80%-or-more-owned subsidiaries (26 U.S.C. § 332), share-for-share exchanges (§368(a)(1)(B)), exchanges of shares for assets (§368(a)(1)(C)), changes in form or place of organization (§368(a)(1)(F)), and recapitalizations (§368(a)(1)(E)). Advance planning is generally required to qualify a transaction under one or more of these provisions and to manage attendant collateral consequences, including §382 ownership-change limitations on net operating losses.

== Earnings and profits ==
Earnings and profits (E&P) is a tax law concept similar to retained earnings. Distributions from a corporation to a shareholder are treated as dividends to the extent of E&P. Definitions vary based on context. Since the term is used to determine the bulk of distributions as dividends, considerable effort is expended by corporations and the IRS in determining E&P. The particular rules vary considerably from rules of generally accepted accounting principles. As an example, businesses may not deduct 50% of meals provided to employees in computing taxable income, but full deduction is allowed in computing E&P. Tax-exempt municipal bond interest, generally not includible in taxable income, is included in E&P. Depreciation limitations differ between book, taxable income, and E&P, and the OBBBA's restoration of 100% bonus depreciation has accentuated these differences.

== Entity classification ==
Business entities may elect to be treated as corporations taxed at the entity and member levels or as "flow-through" entities taxed only at the member level. However, entities organized as corporations under U.S. state laws and certain foreign entities are treated, per se, as corporations, with no optional election. The Internal Revenue Service issued the so-called "check-the-box" regulations in 1997 under which entities may make such choice by filing Form 8832. Absent such election, default classifications for domestic and foreign business entities apply, combined with voluntary entity elections to opt out of the default classifications (except in the case of "per se corporations"). If an entity not treated as a corporation has more than one equity owner and at least one equity owner does not have limited liability (e.g., a general partner), it will be classified as a partnership (i.e., a pass-through), and if the entity has a single equity owner and the single owner does not have limited liability protection, it will be treated as a disregarded entity (i.e., a pass-through).

Some entities treated as corporations may make other elections that enable corporate income to be taxed only at the shareholder level, and not at the corporate level. Such entities are treated similarly to partnerships. The income of the entity is not taxed at the corporate level, and the members must pay tax on their share of the entity's income. These include:

- S corporations, all of whose shareholders must be U.S. citizens or resident individuals; other restrictions apply. The election requires filing Form 2553. After election, an S corporation is not taxable at the corporate level.
- Regulated investment companies (RICs), commonly referred to as mutual funds.
- Real estate investment trusts (REITs).

A 26 U.S.C. § 199A 20% qualified business income deduction—originally a TCJA provision scheduled to sunset after 2025—was made permanent by the OBBBA. The deduction is available to individual owners of qualifying pass-through entities (S corporations, partnerships, sole proprietorships) and produces a maximum effective top-bracket rate of approximately 29.6% on pass-through income, compared to a 21% C-corporation rate plus dividend tax on distributions.

== Information returns and reporting ==
A consolidated return is a single return filed by a parent corporation and its 80%-or-more-owned subsidiaries (vote and value). For purposes of 26 U.S.C. § 1504, an "affiliated group" generally consists of one or more chains of corporations connected through stock ownership with a common parent, where the common parent (directly and indirectly) owns at least 80% of the total voting power and at least 80% of the total value of the stock of each of the subsidiary corporations. The election is unavailable to certain corporations under 26 U.S.C. §§ 1504–b, including S corporations, foreign corporations (other than certain Mexican and Canadian subsidiaries), insurance companies (except as part of an insurance subgroup), regulated investment companies, real estate investment trusts, and tax-exempt corporations. The election allows offsetting income and losses of group members and deferral of income on intercompany transactions under Treasury Regulations §1.1502-13. Significant restrictions and special rules apply to consolidated filings, including the separate return limitation year (SRLY) rules and the loss-disallowance and unified-loss rules.

The federal corporate income tax return is filed on Form 1120, U.S. Corporation Income Tax Return. (Note: S corporations file Form 1120-S; foreign corporations file Form 1120-F; insurance companies file Form 1120-L (life) or Form 1120-PC (property and casualty); REITs file Form 1120-REIT; RICs file Form 1120-RIC. There are 13 variations on the basic Form 1120 in total.) Form 1120 must be accompanied by various schedules, including:

- Schedule L: Balance sheet per books;
- Schedule M-1 (or Schedule M-3 if total assets at year-end are $10 million or more): Reconciliation of income (loss) per books with income per return;
- Schedule UTP (Uncertain Tax Position Statement): Required for corporations with assets ≥ $10 million that issue audited financial statements with reserves for U.S. federal income tax under FASB ASC 740-10 (formerly FIN 48);
- Schedule K and other supporting schedules and forms (e.g., Form 4626 for CAMT, Form 8990 for §163(j), Form 8993 for §250 deduction, Form 8992 for NCTI inclusion).

The original return for a calendar-year C corporation is due on or before the 15th day of the fourth month following the close of the tax year (April 15 for calendar-year filers). (Note: This is the rule for tax years beginning after 2015. The Surface Transportation and Veterans Health Care Choice Improvement Act of 2015 moved the C corporation due date from the 15th day of the third month to the 15th day of the fourth month for tax years beginning after December 31, 2015. (Earlier editions of this article erroneously stated the due date remains the third month.) S corporation returns (Form 1120-S) and partnership returns (Form 1065) remain due on the 15th day of the third month after year-end (March 15 for calendar-year filers).) A six-month extension may be obtained by filing Form 7004 by the original due date. A special rule preserves the 15th-day-of-the-third-month due date through tax years beginning before July 1, 2026 for C corporations with a fiscal year ending June 30 (with a corresponding 7-month extension); for tax years beginning after June 30, 2026, the standard fourth-month rule applies. Tax payment is due by the original due date, regardless of any extension. Estimated quarterly payments are due on the 15th day of the 4th, 6th, 9th, and 12th months of the corporation's tax year.

For returns filed on or after January 1, 2024, corporations are required to file Form 1120 electronically if they file 10 or more returns of any type (including W-2s, Forms 1099, and Forms 941) during the calendar year.

Preparation of non-simple corporate tax returns can be time-consuming. The IRS estimates in the instructions to Form 1120-S, used by privately held S corporations electing pass-through treatment, that the average preparation time per return is over 56 hours, exclusive of recordkeeping time. Comparable burden estimates apply to Form 1120 (the C corporation return), with additional hours required for international information returns (Forms 5471, 5472, 8865, 8858, and 8975) and the supporting workpapers for CAMT, NCTI, FDDEI, BEAT, and §163(j) computations.

State filing requirements vary; most state corporate returns piggy-back on the federal Form 1120 and use a similar due-date framework.

=== Estimated tax payments ===
Corporations expecting to owe federal income tax of $500 or more for the tax year must pay estimated tax in quarterly installments under 26 U.S.C. § 6655. For fiscal-year corporations, the installments are due on the 15th day of the 4th, 6th, 9th, and 12th months of the tax year (April 15, June 15, September 15, and December 15 for calendar-year filers). Each installment must equal at least 25% of the "required annual payment," which is generally the lesser of:

- 100% of the tax shown on the corporation's return for the current year; or
- 100% of the tax shown on the corporation's return for the immediately preceding tax year (the "prior-year safe harbor"), provided the preceding tax year consisted of 12 months and the corporation filed a return for that year showing a tax liability.

The penalty for underpayment of estimated tax is computed under 26 U.S.C. §§ 6655–a at the §6621 underpayment rate (the federal short-term rate plus three percentage points), running from each installment due date to the earlier of the date paid or the original return due date. An underpayment is not waived merely because the year-end tax liability is paid in full by the original due date of the return.

Large corporations. A "large corporation"—defined under 26 U.S.C. §§ 6655–g as a corporation with taxable income of $1 million or more in any of the three immediately preceding taxable years—generally may not use the prior-year safe harbor and must base its installments on 100% of the current-year tax. A limited exception permits a large corporation to use the prior year as the basis for its first installment, with any resulting shortfall added to ("caught up" in) the second installment.

Form 1120-W. Historically, corporations used Form 1120-W (Estimated Tax for Corporations) to compute estimated tax installments. Beginning with tax year 2022, the IRS announced that Form 1120-W would no longer be revised for publication and is retained on its website for informational use only; corporations now apply the §6655 statutory framework directly, with quarterly payments remitted through the Electronic Federal Tax Payment System (EFTPS).

CAMT-related estimated tax relief. CAMT-liable applicable corporations are required to include CAMT in their estimated tax computations. Because of the substantial implementation uncertainty surrounding AFSI determination under the corporate alternative minimum tax (see § CAMT above), the IRS has issued a series of waivers of the addition to tax under §6655 attributable to CAMT liability: Notice 2023-42 (June 7, 2023) waived the addition to tax under §6655 for any tax year beginning after December 31, 2022, and before January 1, 2024, with respect to a corporation's CAMT liability; the notice directed corporations to exclude the CAMT from "tax" for §6655 purposes during the waiver period; Notice 2024-33 extended that relief to the first installment of a tax year beginning in 2024; and Notice 2024-66 further extended CAMT estimated-tax relief through the third installment of tax years beginning in 2024. Subsequent guidance (Notice 2025-49 and related instruments) has continued partial relief on a year-by-year basis pending the issuance of revised final regulations. Corporations claiming the CAMT relief must continue to compute and remit estimated payments with respect to their regular-tax liability.

Stock repurchase excise tax. The 1% stock repurchase excise tax under §4501 is reported on Form 720 on a quarterly basis (with attached Form 7208) and is not part of the §6655 estimated income tax framework.

=== International information reporting ===
Corporations engaged in cross-border activities are subject to extensive information reporting obligations, with substantial penalties for non-compliance:

- Form 5471 (Information Return of U.S. Persons With Respect To Certain Foreign Corporations) — required under 26 U.S.C. § 6038 for U.S. persons that are officers, directors, or 10%-or-greater shareholders of certain foreign corporations. Base penalty: $10,000 per form.
- Form 5472 (Information Return of a 25% Foreign-Owned U.S. Corporation or a Foreign Corporation Engaged in a U.S. Trade or Business) — required under 26 U.S.C. § 6038A and 26 U.S.C. § 6038C. The penalty was increased by TCJA from $10,000 to $25,000 per form for tax years beginning after December 31, 2017, with continuation penalties uncapped after IRS notification. Effective January 1, 2017, foreign-owned U.S. disregarded entities are also treated as reporting corporations subject to Form 5472 filing.
- Form 8865 (Return of U.S. Persons With Respect to Certain Foreign Partnerships).
- Form 8858 (Information Return of U.S. Persons With Respect to Foreign Disregarded Entities and Foreign Branches).
- Form 8975 (Country-by-Country Report) and Schedule A — required for U.S. parents of multinational groups with consolidated revenue ≥ $850 million; implements OECD BEPS Action 13.
- Form 8833 (Treaty-Based Return Position Disclosure) — required under 26 U.S.C. § 6114 for treaty-based positions exceeding specified thresholds.
- Schedules K-2 and K-3 — partnership and S corporation international reporting introduced in tax year 2021, replacing prior limited Schedule K-1 international items.

== Transfer pricing ==
26 U.S.C. § 482 authorizes the IRS to allocate income, deductions, credits, and allowances among commonly controlled organizations or businesses to clearly reflect income and prevent the avoidance of taxes. Detailed regulations under §482 (Treas. Reg. §1.482-1 et seq.) generally require that prices charged in controlled transactions satisfy the arm's length principle. The principal methods for tangible-property and services transactions are the comparable uncontrolled price (CUP) method, the resale price method, the cost-plus method, the comparable profits method (CPM), and the profit split method. For intangibles, the comparable uncontrolled transaction (CUT) method, the CPM, and unspecified methods may apply. Cost sharing arrangements (CSAs) under Treas. Reg. §1.482-7 allow related parties to share the costs of developing intangible property in proportion to reasonably anticipated benefits.

In Altera Corp. v. Commissioner, 926 F.3d 1061 (9th Cir. 2019) (the Tax Court's contrary decision having been reversed), the Ninth Circuit upheld the validity of Treasury Regulation §1.482-7A(d)(2), requiring participants in a qualified cost-sharing arrangement to share the costs of stock-based compensation. The Supreme Court denied certiorari in 2020.

In Coca-Cola Co. v. Commissioner, 155 T.C. 145 (2020), final decision entered August 2, 2024, the Tax Court upheld approximately $9 billion in §482 transfer pricing adjustments based on the IRS's CPM analysis using Coca-Cola's unrelated bottlers as comparables. Coca-Cola appealed to the Eleventh Circuit; appellate proceedings remain pending as of May 2026.

A 20% accuracy-related penalty under 26 U.S.C. §§ 6662–e applies to substantial valuation misstatements (transactional or net adjustment), increased to 40% for gross valuation misstatements under 26 U.S.C. §§ 6662–h; the penalties may be avoided by maintaining contemporaneous transfer pricing documentation that satisfies the principal-documents and background-documents standards of Treas. Reg. §1.6662-6(d). The IRS administers an advance pricing agreement (APA) program (under Rev. Proc. 2015-41 and successors), and the United States participates extensively in OECD/G20 country-by-country reporting (Form 8975 and Schedule A) for multinational groups with annual revenue ≥ $850 million.

== Corporate tax avoidance ==
Corporate tax avoidance refers to the use of legal means to reduce a corporation's income tax liability. The empirical literature generally distinguishes avoidance from evasion (which involves illegal conduct) and from "aggressive tax planning" (the contested middle category). Desai and Dharmapala (2009), in an influential study, found that an increase in corporate tax avoidance is not, on average, associated with an increase in shareholder value at well-governed firms, suggesting that avoidance may be correlated with managerial agency costs rather than with pure shareholder-value maximization.

A separate strand of empirical literature has examined the relationship between state-level corruption and corporate tax avoidance. Al-Hadi, Taylor, and Richardson (2022) reported that state-level corruption in the United States is positively associated with corporate tax avoidance: an increase in corporate-corruption convictions in a state was found to reduce the GAAP tax expense of firms headquartered in that state, with the effect concentrated in states with a low litigation-risk profile. DeBacker, Heim, and Tran (2015) found that firms headquartered in U.S. states with higher levels of corruption are more likely to engage in corporate tax evasion, an effect they attribute in part to corruption-culture transmission from foreign jurisdictions to U.S.-domiciled subsidiaries.

The principal U.S. disclosure regimes intended to give tax administrators visibility into corporate tax positions—including positions reflecting aggressive tax planning—are the Schedule UTP (Uncertain Tax Position Statement, required for corporations with assets of $10 million or more that book FASB ASC 740-10 reserves), the Schedule M-3 book-tax reconciliation, and the country-by-country reporting on Form 8975. The IRS's Large Business and International (LB&I) Division publicly identifies "campaigns" addressing specific transactional patterns considered to present compliance risk.

== History ==
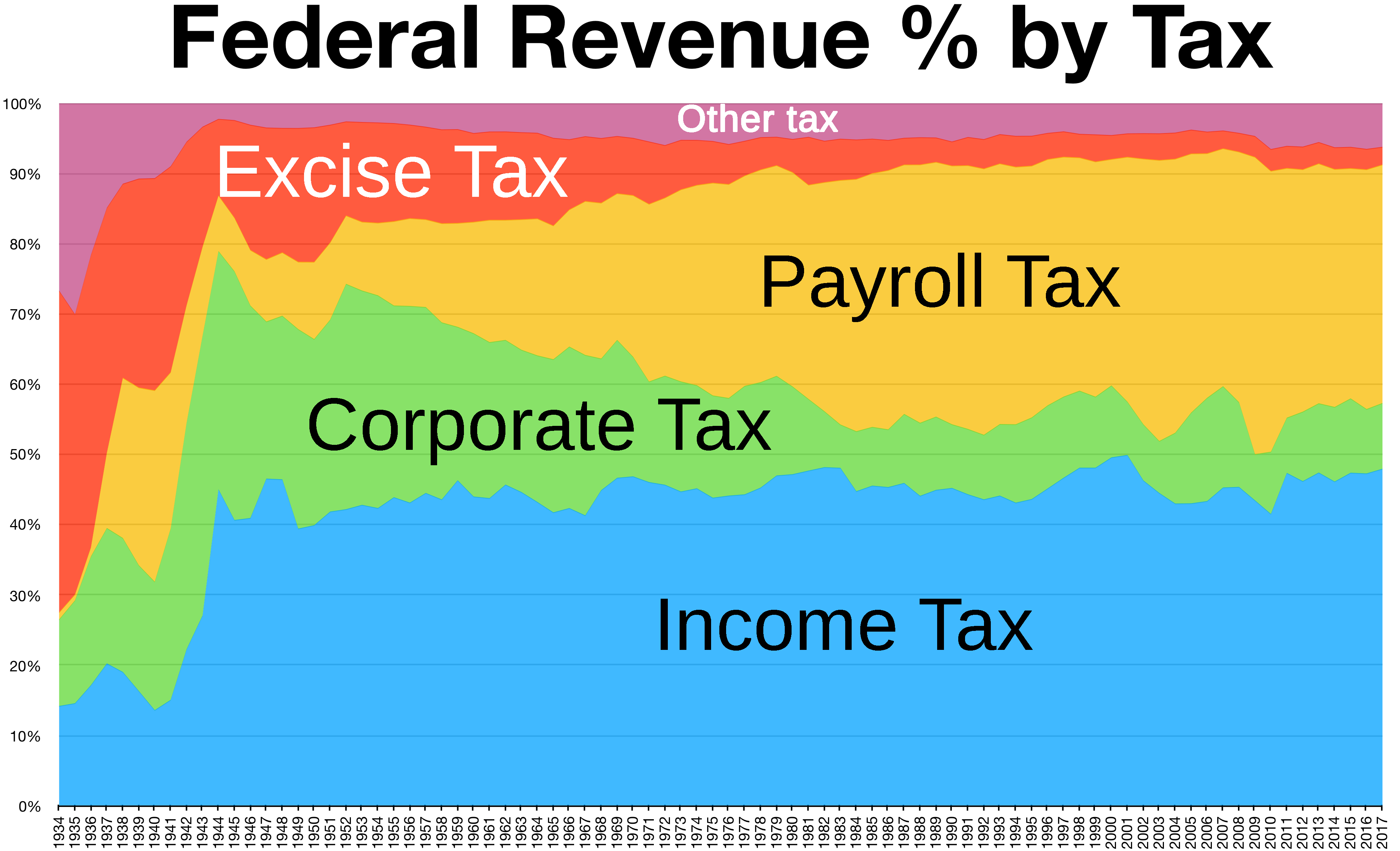
U.S. tax revenue by source, historical

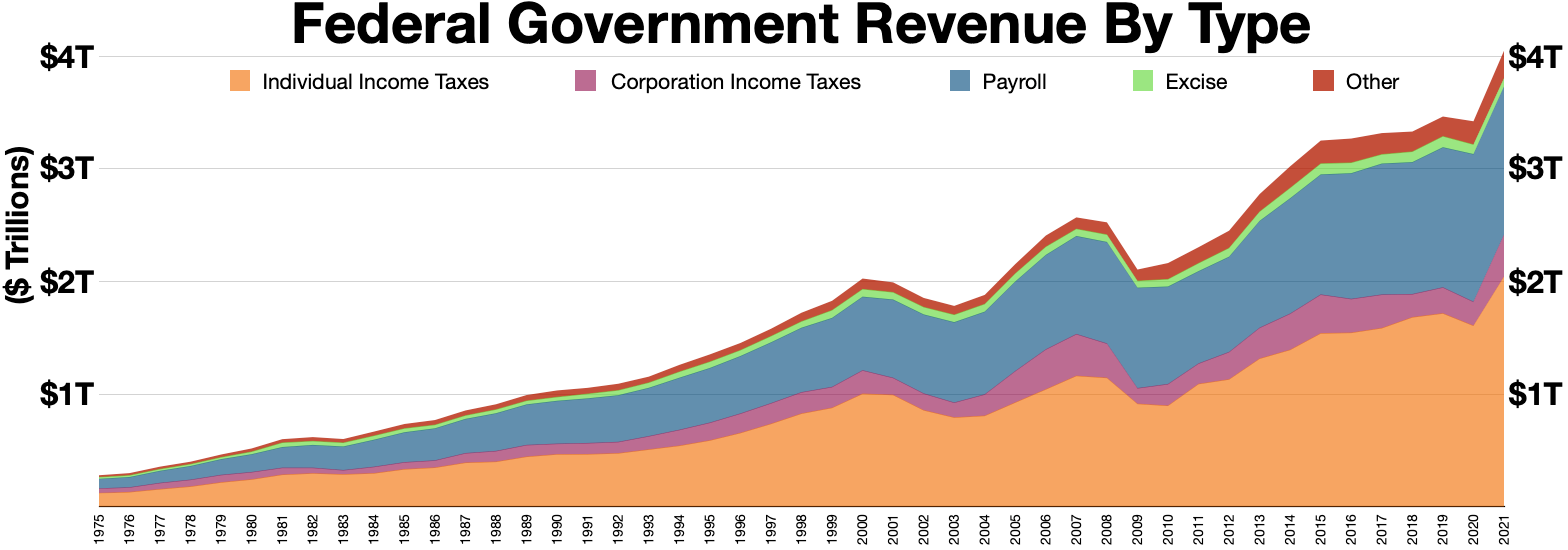
Federal government revenue by type Other Excise tax Payroll tax Corporate tax Personal income tax

The first federal income tax was enacted in 1861 and expired in 1872 amid constitutional challenges. A corporate income tax was enacted in 1894, but a key aspect of it was shortly held unconstitutional. In 1909, Congress enacted an excise tax on corporations based on income. After ratification of the Sixteenth Amendment to the U.S. Constitution, this became the corporate provisions of the federal income tax. Amendments to various provisions affecting corporations have been in most or all revenue acts since.

For tax years beginning before 2018, federal corporate income tax was imposed at a graduated structure with rates ranging from 15% to 35%. Tax preferences for many provisions, such as accelerated depreciation and stock option compensation, gave rise to a long-running debate about the corporate alternative minimum tax, which existed for corporations from 1986 to 2017 and was reintroduced in modified form (CAMT) by the Inflation Reduction Act of 2022. The 2017 TCJA's elimination of the prior corporate AMT (effective 2018) was reversed in part by the IRA's enactment of the new 15% AFSI-based CAMT.

The most material change since the Tax Reform Act of 1986 was the Tax Cuts and Jobs Act of 2017, followed by the Inflation Reduction Act of 2022 and the One Big Beautiful Bill Act of 2025.

== TCJA-era and post-TCJA developments ==
The Tax Cuts and Jobs Act of 2017 was the most significant restructuring of the U.S. corporate tax system since 1986. Major TCJA provisions, most of which were retained or made permanent under OBBBA, included:

- a flat 21% corporate rate (replacing the graduated 15%-to-35% structure);
- repeal of the corporate alternative minimum tax (since reinstated in modified form by IRA);
- movement to a "quasi-territorial" system through the §245A 100% participation exemption, the §965 transition tax, GILTI/NCTI, FDII/FDDEI, and BEAT;
- a temporary 100% bonus depreciation (made permanent by OBBBA);
- required capitalization and amortization of R&E expenses (since reversed for domestic R&E by OBBBA's §174A);
- an EBIT-based §163(j) limitation effective 2022 (since restored to EBITDA by OBBBA);
- the 26 U.S.C. § 199A 20% qualified business income deduction for pass-through entities (made permanent by OBBBA);
- repeal of the §199 domestic production activities deduction;
- elimination of the corporate 26 U.S.C. § 172 net operating loss carryback (with limited exceptions) and an 80%-of-taxable-income limitation on NOL deductions;
- introduction of 26 U.S.C. § 267A hybrid mismatch rules; and
- increased Form 5472 penalties from $10,000 to $25,000 per failure.

The Inflation Reduction Act of 2022 added the corporate alternative minimum tax (15%), the 1% stock buyback excise tax, and a host of new and expanded clean-energy tax credits available to corporations. The IRA's clean-energy credits are now transferable under 26 U.S.C. § 6418 and may be used by applicable corporations against CAMT (subject to general business credit ordering rules).

The One Big Beautiful Bill Act of 2025 (P.L. 119-21), signed by President Trump on July 4, 2025, made the foregoing TCJA business provisions permanent (including the 21% corporate rate and §199A 20% deduction) and generally rebalanced the international regime in favor of inbound investment, restored full expensing for R&E and capital investment, and increased BEAT and the §250 deduction effective rates by smaller amounts than the rate increases that had been scheduled in 2026.

In his fiscal year 2022, 2023, and 2024 budgets, President Biden proposed raising the corporate income tax rate from 21% to 28%. The proposal did not advance, and OBBBA reaffirmed the 21% rate as permanent law. President Trump publicly proposed during the 2024 campaign reducing the corporate rate to 15% for domestic manufacturers, but no rate change was ultimately enacted.

== Examples ==
A corporate income tax is levied by federal and state governments on business profits, which are revenues (what a business makes in sales) minus costs (the cost of doing business). Businesses in the United States operate under one of two tax structures. Sole proprietors and pass-through entities (S corporations, partnerships, limited liability companies, etc.) pay business taxes through their owners' individual income tax returns. C corporations file the U.S. Corporate Income Tax Return (Form 1120) and pay tax at the corporate level.

Examples of corporate tax computation as of 2026 (assuming a calendar-year domestic C corporation, 21% federal flat rate, no state tax, no credits, and no special items):

| Item | Amount |
|---|---|
| Gross revenue | $1,000,000 |
| Cost of goods sold | ($400,000) |
| Gross profit | 600,000 |
| Operating expenses | ($300,000) |
| Depreciation (assume §168(k) 100% bonus on $50,000 of new equipment placed in service after Jan. 19, 2025) | ($50,000) |
| §174A domestic R&E expenditures (now expensed) | ($40,000) |
| Net business interest (within §163(j) EBITDA-based 30% ATI limit) | ($20,000) |
| Taxable income | 190,000 |
| Federal income tax @ 21% | 39,900 |

Under pre-OBBBA law (tax years beginning before 2025), the same facts would have produced a lower deduction for depreciation (40% of $50,000 = $20,000 plus straight-line on the remainder) and required capitalization and 5-year amortization of the $40,000 of R&E (resulting in $4,000 of current-year deductions in 2025 and the balance amortized over five years), substantially increasing taxable income.

== See also ==
- Income tax in the United States
- Tax Cuts and Jobs Act
- Inflation Reduction Act of 2022
- One Big Beautiful Bill Act
- Corporate alternative minimum tax
- Base erosion and anti-abuse tax
- Global Intangible Low-Taxed Income
- Foreign-derived intangible income
- Texas franchise tax
- Subpart F income
- Earnings and profits
- Dividends received deduction
- Consolidated return regulations
- Qualified Production Activities Income
- Taxation of cooperative corporations in the United States
