= B&O =

B&O may refer to:

- Baltimore and Ohio Railroad
- Bang & Olufsen, an electronics company
- Bullets and Octane, a band
- Business and occupation tax
