= DRD =

DRD may refer to:

- Data Retention Directive, a European Union directive on storing telephony communications
- Decision Requirements Diagrams, a part of the Decision Model and Notation standard
- Defending Rights & Dissent
- Denver Roller Dolls, roller skating
- Department of Rural Development, a division of the Ministry of Livestock, Fisheries and Rural Development in Myanmar
- Department for Regional Development, a former executive department in Northern Ireland
- Design Requirements Document, software engineering; similar to a User Requirements Document
- Dividends received deduction, a financial term
- Diagnostic Repair Drones, fictional robots from Farscape
- Dopamine-responsive dystonia, a disease
- Drdgold, South African mining company
- Dynamic Root Disk, computing

== Codes ==
- Amtrak train station code for Durand Union Station
- ICAO airline designator code for Air Madrid
- former stock symbol for Duane Reade
- Indian railways station code for Dahanu Road railway station, Maharashtra, India

== People ==
- Dario Faini, Italian songwriter and producer also known under the pseudonyms DRD o Dardust
