= Formulary apportionment =

Method of allocating corporate taxation between jurisdictions

Formulary apportionment, also known as unitary taxation, is a method of splitting the total pre-tax profit earned (or loss incurred) by a multinational between the tax jurisdictions where it does business. It is an alternative to separate entity accounting, under which a branch or subsidiary within the jurisdiction is accounted for as a separate entity, requiring prices for transactions with other parts of the corporation or group to be assigned according to the arm's length standard commonly used in transfer pricing. In contrast, formulary apportionment attributes a portion of a multinational's total worldwide profit (or loss) to each jurisdiction, based on factors such as the proportion of sales, assets or payroll in that jurisdiction.

When applied to a corporate group, formulary apportionment requires combined reporting of the group's results. The parent and all of its subsidiaries are viewed as though they were a single entity (unitary combination), and the method is then also known as worldwide unitary taxation. In the US, most states have adopted water's edge combined reporting which restricts the taxable group to just US domestic corporations and excludes "overseas business organization", i.e., unitary foreign affiliates and foreign parents.

== In North America taxation ==
Formulary methods are used in both the United States and Canada to apportion income of corporations between the states or provinces in which they operate. However, trade between the United States and Canada is not covered, thus requiring transfer prices, leading to increased compliance costs for the corporation. Tax in each US state and Canadian province is thus assessed based on the unitary combination of all related entities. The related entities included in the unitary combination may be worldwide entities or only entities within the United States, depending on the state. The latter is known as water's edge combined reporting.

Worldwide unitary combined reporting was first approved by the US Supreme Court in 1983 in Container Corp. v. Franchise Tax Board (CA) by a vote of 5-3 (Justice Stevens did not participate). The court re-visited worldwide combined reporting in 1994 in Barclays Bank v. Franchise Tax Board (CA) and Colgate-Palmolive v. Franchise Tax Board (CA) and again approved its use by California but this time by larger majorities. The votes were 7-2 and 9–0, respectively. However, as a result of foreign retaliatory legislation and pressure from the federal government, all states have now abandoned mandatory worldwide combined reporting.

The use of formulary apportionment in the United States dates back to the late 19th century. At that time, there was no state or federal corporate income tax, but the states did assess property and capital stock taxes. With the growth of the transcontinental railroads, state taxation authorities faced companies which had not just immovable property (tracks) but also non-trivial movable property (rolling stock) operating across state lines. The property value of a US company assessable to state tax was thus assessed by examining the proportion of railway lines within the state, and then taking that proportion of the company's total value (including the movable property) as the portion of value located within a certain state. When Wisconsin adopted a state income tax in 1911, it also used formulary apportionment (based on property, cost of manufacture, and sales), pointing to the impracticality of otherwise calculating separate accounts for a US company operating in multiple states.

By the mid-20th century, the "Massachusetts Formula" had become a commonly used standard of formulary apportionment. The formula placed an equal weight on three factors: group sales, payroll, and property within each jurisdiction. Out of the forty-four states (plus one more jurisdiction, the District of Columbia) which imposed a corporate income tax in 1978, all but Iowa used the Massachusetts Formula. Iowa's formula ignored payroll and property, looking solely at sales; the constitutionality of this formula was challenged in the Moorman case in Iowa, and it was held invalid by a trial court under the Due Process Clause of the Fourteenth Amendment as well as the Commerce Clause of Article One; however, the Iowa Supreme Court reversed the trial court in 1978. This marked the beginning of a trend towards increasing weight on sales at the expense of the other two factors; by 2004, there were only twelve states still using an equally weighted formula.

== In international taxation ==
Formulary apportionment is not used as a method of attributing profit between (rather than within) national tax jurisdictions. The adoption of formulary apportionment has been advocated at various times since the 1970s. The matter has been hotly debated by OECD member states beginning in the 1970s. In 2000, there was a proposal to use formulary apportionment within the European Union. In 2001, the EU issued a communication advocating the use of formulary apportionment. In 2007, it was suggested that the US Internal Revenue Service use formulary apportionment (actually a hybrid approach: routine return plus residual profit split) in the assessment of federal corporate income tax, believing it would lead to increased tax revenue in the face of a trend for multinational corporations to use transfer pricing to shift profits out of the US into low-tax countries. None of these suggestions has been adopted.

Several US states allow, but do not mandate, a multinational to include foreign entities in its formulary apportionment. California, for example, began to accept worldwide formulary apportionment in the 1940s. However, its attempt to require such apportionment led to strong protests from US trading partners. The UK-US double taxation treaty signed in 1975 included a provision to prohibit US states from "tak[ing] into account the income, deductions, receipts, or out-goings of a related enterprise" in the United Kingdom or any other country for the purpose of determining tax liability. However, the US Senate, whose consent was required to ratify the treaty, rejected this provision, and the treaty was amended by a protocol in 1979. The Supreme Court explicitly held worldwide formulary apportionment as constitutional in separate cases in 1983 and 1994 (Barclays Bank PLC v. Franchise Tax Board). In 1985 the United Kingdom passed retaliatory legislation which would have overridden the UK-US tax treaty and denied significant UK tax benefits to corporations headquartered in US states which applied worldwide formulary apportionment. This and further pressure from foreign governments, the executive branch and multinational corporations led US states to adopt a "water's edge" limitation on formulary apportionment, allowing taxpayers to decide for themselves whether or not to include foreign entities in their combined reporting.

== Benefits ==
- Reduced compliance costs to the multinational;
- Reduced policing costs for governments;
- Profits are apportioned more closely to where value is created;
- Multinationals will locate activities in the most efficient locations, not based on tax rates;
- Multinationals will improve their ethical credentials;
- Tax experts can be redeployed on value-adding tasks; and
- Potential efficiency gains from harmonisation with the formulary approach used for apportioning national profits in US, Canada, China and Germany

== Criticism ==
Critics argue:

- Formulary apportionment leads to double taxation of the same profits unless there is agreement among all the jurisdictions on the formula to be used and the composition of the combined group.
- Tax could be avoided by manipulation of the components of the formula like the location of mobile assets.
- Compliance costs would be increased by the need to calculate each component of the formula in each jurisdiction.
- Compliance costs would be much higher unless all jurisdictions adopted a common method of calculating taxable profits. Otherwise a separate calculation of worldwide group profits would be required under each jurisdiction's tax accounting rules. The issue is significantly reduced within the United States and Canada because variations among each jurisdiction's tax accounting methods are relatively minor.
- If members of the group account in different currencies, currency exchange rate movements could distort the results of the apportionment.
- Formulary apportionment does not reflect the economic profit or loss of each entity. For example, a profitable group that incurs a loss in a particular territory has taxable profit apportioned to that territory, and conversely a loss-making group which makes profits in a particular territory has no taxable profits in that territory. However, the loss-making entity could be paying artificially high transfer prices for the products it is selling in that particular market.

== See also ==
- Combined Reporting
- Tax consolidation
