= Net operating loss =

Under U.S. Federal income tax law, a net operating loss (NOL) occurs when certain tax-deductible expenses exceed taxable revenues for a taxable year. If a taxpayer is taxed during profitable periods without receiving any tax relief (e.g., a refund) during periods of NOLs, an unbalanced tax burden results. Consequently, in some situations, Congress allows taxpayers to use the losses in one year to offset the profits of other years.

== Calculating the NOL amount ==
The NOL amount is the amount of the loss from the current year that can be carried forward to future years or, in certain instances, carried back to prior years.

=== Individuals ===
For individuals, the NOL amount is generally the excess of deductions over income from the operation of a business. The following items are excluded when calculating the NOL amount:

- net capital losses, i.e., capital losses in excess of capital gains; (net capital gains are included)
- nonbusiness deductions in excess of nonbusiness income; (net nonbusiness income is included)

In addition, the NOL amount excludes other adjustments such as:

- Section 1202 exclusion of the gain from the sale or exchange of qualified small business stock (QSBS)
- NOL deduction from other tax years
- domestic production activities deduction

=== Corporations ===
For corporations, an NOL is the excess of the deductions allowed over gross income with the following adjustments.

- no NOL deduction
- no Section 199 domestic production activities deduction
- the dividends received deductions for dividends received are computed without regard to Section 246(b) limit
- the dividends paid deduction is computed without regard to the limitation under Section 247(a)(1)(B).

== Loss carryback and carryforward mechanisms ==
The Tax Cuts and Jobs Act of 2017 eliminated the net operating loss carryback and changed the use of carryforwards. This provision was enacted in order to defray the overall cost of the legislation. The Joint Committee on Taxation estimated the changes would raise $201 billion from 2018 to 2027. Carryforwards can now be used for an unlimited time period as opposed to the previous 20-year limit. However, NOLs can no longer completely eliminate a taxpayer's income. The NOLs used in any one year is limited to 80% of taxable income.

In 2020, as a result of the economic fallout of the COVID-19 pandemic in the United States, the CARES Act was passed which temporarily and retroactively changed the NOL rules for the tax years between 2018 and 2020. Specifically, NOLs from 2018, 2019, and 2020 could be carried back up to five years, resulting in tax refunds from prior years. Also, for the same time period, NOLs could once again be used 100% in order to reduce a taxpayer's income to zero.

Prior to passage of the 2017 Act, NOLs could be carried back to the two tax years before the NOL year. For example, the tax loss from 2015 could be carried back to 2013 or 2014. Any remaining amount could be carried forward for up to 20 years. The taxpayer could elect to waive the carryback and therefore carry all of the loss to future years. Once the 20-year carryforward period expires, the taxpayer would not be able to deduct any part of the remaining NOL.

For tax years prior to 2018, the carryback period for certain NOLs is greater than two years:

3-year carryback period

- losses from casualty or theft
- farm or small business losses related to a federally declared disaster
- qualified small business losses

5-year carryback period

- farm losses
- qualifying disaster losses (corporations only)

10-year carryback period

- losses related to product liability claims
- decommissioning of a nuclear power plant - (corporations only)
- losses related to reclamation of land and dismantling of drilling platforms
- losses related to environmental contamination and workers compensation act payments
- Qualified Gulf Opportunity Zone (GO Zone) losses - (corporations only)

If the corporation has a corporate equity reduction transaction, a different carryforward period may apply.

Section 1211 of the American Recovery and Reinvestment Act of 2009 increased the carryback period for small businesses. For net operating losses incurred in 2008, the carryback period was increased to 5 years.

== Financial statement reporting ==
Under US GAAP, the amount of net operating losses available for future years is reported in the notes to the financial statements. For example, Kinross Gold reported $US 893 million of NOL carryforwards available as at December 31, 2014, related to its subsidiaries in Barbados.
