= Participation exemption =

Participation exemption is a general term relating to an exemption from taxation for a shareholder in a company on dividends received, and potential capital gains arising on the sale of shares.

== Background ==
The justification for a participation exemption is to eliminate double taxation of shareholders.

In any accounting period, a company may pay a form of corporate income tax on its taxable profit which reduces the amount of post-tax profit available for distribution by dividend to shareholders.

In the absence of a participation exemption, or other form of tax relief, shareholders may pay tax on the amount of dividend income received. This results in double taxation as the dividend is paid out of taxed profits of the company.

A participation exemption will typically provide that certain types of dividends are not taxed in the hands of shareholders. In addition, many participation exemption regimes provide that capital gains on shares are not taxed as long as a specified proportion of the company's share capital is held for a specified period.

A participation exemption may apply to qualifying shareholdings in overseas companies, domestic companies, or both.

== Participation exemption regimes ==
The existence of a participation exemption under a local tax regime enhances a jurisdiction's attractiveness as a holding company location, although other factors such as the presence of a network of double taxation treaties are relevant.

Countries with a participation exemption include:

- Austria
- Belgium
- Ireland
- Luxembourg
- Malta
- Netherlands
- Norway
- Portugal
- Italy
- Sweden
- UK (on foreign dividend income (subject to anti-avoidance) but not for gains on the sale of foreign subsidiaries)

Ireland announced a roadmap for the introduction of a dividend participation exemption to Ireland's corporate tax regime, effective starting 1 January 2025.

EU Directive 2011/96/EU exempts intra-EU dividends and other profit distributions paid by subsidiary companies to their parent companies from withholding taxes and to eliminate double taxation of such income at the level of the parent company, provided that the parent company and subsidiary are located in different EU member states.

== Mechanism ==
Participation exemptions generally limit taxation of a parent company (corporation) in its country of organization on income from subsidiaries. This reduction of taxation generally has some limitations as to the nature of income on which tax is reduced and the minimum level and period of ownership of the subsidiary. Participation exemptions are only relevant in countries which tax companies on their income from sources outside the country.

Some systems (e.g., The Netherlands) provide that dividends from a subsidiary meeting the minimum ownership requirements is wholly exempt from taxation. Some systems provide a partial exemption. A few extend this treatment to interest or other forms of participation.

Most systems require that the parent company must own some significant portion (e.g., 25 percent) of the equity of the subsidiary in order to qualify for participation exemption. In addition, most systems require that this ownership either have already continued for a minimum period at the time the income is received or continue beyond the date of such receipt until the minimum period is reached. The minimum ownership period is often one year.

A few systems require an advance ruling by tax authorities in order to benefit from participation exemption. This requirement, however, is becoming less prevalent.

== Alternatives to participation exemption ==
Some jurisdictions offer alternative forms of tax relief which are designed to achieve similar results to a participation exemption.

== See also ==
- Dividends received deduction
