= Taxation of cooperative corporations in the United States =

The taxation of cooperative corporations in the United States is subject to special rules under subchapter T of the Internal Revenue Code, different from both subchapter C and subchapter S corporations.

== Overview ==
Cooperative corporations are formed to provide some mutual benefit for their members, and because of this, the Congress of the United States beginning in 1951 has allowed them a deduction from their income for "patronage dividends." A "patronage dividend" is money paid by a cooperative to its patrons on the basis of business done with these patrons, pursuant to a pre-existing obligation, and based on the net earnings of the cooperative from the business done.

In practice, cooperatives typically charge their members for services and refund the profits proportionately. In essence, the above rule provides that the cooperative corporation need not include this amount paid back to the patrons, as a C corporation ordinarily would.

Note that dividends paid out by a cooperative corporation which are not attributable to business done with patrons pursuant to the above definition are still subject to taxation at the corporate level (and the shareholder level). Because of this difference in tax treatment, cooperative corporations will typically keep separate accounting for "patronage dividends" and "non-patronage dividends."

== See also ==
- Corporate tax in the United States
- Types of business entity
