= Interstate Income Act of 1959 =

Public Law 86-272, alternatively but unofficially known as the Interstate Income Act of 1959, is a United States statute that allows a business to go, or send representatives, into a state to solicit orders for goods without being subject to a net income tax. It is codified at 15 U.S.C. §§ 381–384.

== History ==
Public Law 86-272 was enacted in response to outcries from business over the decision held in Northwestern States Portland Cement Co. v. Minnesota, 358 U.S. 450 (1959). In Northwestern States, the Supreme Court upheld the imposition of a Minnesota tax on an Iowa corporation that solicited orders and maintained a leased office in Minnesota. However, the Court did not make clear whether the maintenance of employees in the state (who solicited orders that were delivered and accepted outside the state) would have been enough to give rise to the state’s power to impose its tax.

Public Law 86-272 addressed that circumstance by acting as a 'stopgap' by restricting a state from collecting income tax on solicited sales within its borders, as long as the orders are filled or shipped outside of the state.

== Provisions of the Act ==
=== Personal property ===
Public Law 86-272 protects only solicitation of orders for tangible personal property.

=== Solicitation ===
Protection applies to activities that are limited to:

- Solicitation by employees of orders that are approved outside the state and shipped from outside the state.
- Solicitation by independent contractors if the sales are shipped from outside the state.

=== Exclusions ===
Public Law 86-272 does not protect a corporation in the state where it is incorporated. Likewise, it does not protect sellers of services or intangibles. In addition, it provides protection only from taxes measured by income. Taxes measured by net worth or gross receipts, or sales and use taxes, are not covered.
