= Tax consolidation =

Tax consolidation, or combined reporting, is a regime adopted in the tax or revenue legislation of a number of countries which treats a group of wholly owned or majority-owned companies and other entities (such as trusts and partnerships) as a single entity for tax purposes. This generally means that the head entity of the group is responsible for all or most of the group's tax obligations (such as paying tax and lodging tax returns). Consolidation is usually an all-or-nothing event: once the decision to consolidate has been made, companies are irrevocably bound. Only by having less than a 100% interest in a subsidiary can that subsidiary be left out of the consolidation.

The aim of a tax consolidation regime is to reduce administrative costs for government revenue departments and reduce compliance costs for corporate taxpayers. For companies, consolidating can help understate profits by having losses in one group company reduce profits for another. Assets can be transferred between group companies without triggering a tax on gain for the company receiving assets, dividends can be paid between group companies without incurring tax liabilities, and tax attributes of one group company such as imputation credits can be used by other companies in the group. In some jurisdictions there may be other benefits, such as the ability to look through the acquisition of shares of acquired companies to depreciate the underlying assets.

Countries which have adopted a tax consolidation regime include the United States, France, Australia and New Zealand. Countries which do not permit tax consolidation often have rules which provide some of the benefits. For example, the United Kingdom has a system of group relief, which permits profits of one group company to be reduced by losses of another group company.

Consolidation regimes can include onerous rules and regulations. There are typically complex rules to deal with the acquisition of companies with tax losses or other tax attributes. Both the United States and Australia have rules which restrict the use of such losses in the wider group. In Australia, fixed trusts and 100% partnerships can be members of a consolidated group, but the head company must be a company and cannot be a trust or partnership.

== United States consolidated returns ==
United States federal income tax rules permit commonly controlled corporations to file a consolidated return. The income tax and credits of the consolidated group are computed as if the group were a single taxpayer. Intercorporate dividends are eliminated. Once a group has elected to file a consolidated return, all members joining the group must participate in the filing. The common parent corporation files returns, and is entitled to make all elections related to tax matters. The common parent acts as agent for the members, and it and the members remain jointly and severally liable for all federal income taxes. Many U.S. states permit or require consolidated returns for corporations filing federal consolidated returns.

=== Requirements for filing ===
Only entities organized in the United States and treated as corporations may file a consolidated Federal income tax return. The return is filed by a “common parent” and only those subsidiaries in which the common parent owns 80% or more of the vote AND value. The parent and all subsidiaries must file Form 1122 to elect to file a consolidated return in the first year of election. Every 80% subsidiary must make the election or it is not valid. Thereafter, all corporations that begin to meet the 80% vote and value test must join in the consolidated return. If a subsidiary ceases to meet the 80% vote and value test, it is removed from the group. Adjustments to basis and other tax attributes apply upon a subsidiary joining or leaving a group.

=== Consolidated taxable income ===
Taxable income of each member is computed as if no consolidated return were filed, with the exception of certain items computed on a consolidated basis. Then adjustments are made for certain transactions between group members. Dividends between group members are eliminated. Sales of property between members give rise to a deferred intercompany transaction. The effect on the selling member is deferred and recognized as the corresponding effects are recognized by the buying member. For example, Member A sells Member B some goods at a profit. This profit is not recognized until Member B sells the goods or recognizes depreciation expense on the goods. These complex rules require adjustments related to intra-group sales of property (including depreciable assets and inventory), transactions in stock or other obligations of members, performance of services, entry and exit of members, and certain back-to-back and avoidance transactions.

Certain deductions and most credits are computed on a consolidated rather than separate company basis. These include the deductions for net operating loss, charitable contributions, domestic production activities deduction, dividends received deduction and others.

=== Basis and related items ===
Each member of a group must recognize gain or loss on disposition of its shares of other members. Such gain or loss is affected by the member's basis in such shares. Basis must be adjusted for several items, including taxable income or loss recognized by the other member, distributions, and certain other items. To the extent a member recognizes losses in excess of the owner's basis, such excess loss is treated as negative basis for all U.S. Federal income tax purposes. Additional adjustments apply in the case of intra-group reorganizations or acquisition of the common parent, and upon entry to or exit from the group by a member. The adjustments “tier up” to consolidated return members who own shares of the entity making the adjustment. Numerous other adjustments apply.

=== Filing periods ===
All members of the group must use the same tax year as the common parent. This may be adopted or changed by the common parent. If one group acquires another group, the acquiring common parent's tax year must be adopted by all acquired subsidiaries then meeting the 80% vote and value test. Short periods may be required upon joining or leaving a group. In addition, if a member enters or leaves the group, certain adjustments to earnings and profits, basis, and other tax attributes apply.

== Fiscal unity ==
Several countries allow related groups of corporations to compute income tax on a consolidated basis, in a manner similar to consolidation for financial reporting purposes. This is referred to in the Netherlands and Luxembourg as a Fiscal Unity, and in France as Intégration Fiscale. A similar consolidated return regime applies in Spain. In such systems, consolidating eliminations of income and expense are taken into account.

The Netherlands system allows a group of Netherlands resident corporations and branches of foreign corporations to elect to be taxed as a Fiscal Unity. Such election is permitted only for a parent corporation and its 95% or greater owned subsidiaries. Upon election, the parent is taxed on the combined income of the members of the group. The parent and subsidiaries retain joint and several liability for the tax of the group.

Netherlands fiscal unity functions much like financial statement consolidation. Intra-group transactions, including property transfers, are generally eliminated. Most intra-group reorganizations do not trigger taxable events.

== Group relief ==
Some countries allow losses of one commonly controlled company to offset the profits of another commonly controlled company. The United Kingdom permits group relief, and Germany permits an Organschaft. Neither of these systems involve combined reporting or combined tax return filing, though certain additional reporting may be required.

Under the UK scheme, a company's losses may be surrendered to a related company if several conditions are met. The companies must be 75% owned companies. For this purpose, a parent company and its subsidiaries qualify if the parent company owns at least 75% of the ordinary share capital of the subsidiary(ies) and have a beneficial interest in at least 75% of any distributions of earnings or upon winding up. Alternative similar rules apply for certain consortia and branches. Under European Court of Justice rulings incorporated into UK law, the parent company need not be resident in the UK.

The UK scheme allows losses of one group member to be relieved (deducted) by members using a different accounting period, with certain adjustments. Trading (business) losses, capital losses, certain excess (disallowed) management expenses from non-UK affiliates, and certain excess charges may be relieved, subject to limitations. The surrender of these items is done by one company for the benefit of one other company.

== Unitary groups ==
Some states in the United States require related corporations to file a consolidated return if such corporations constitute a unitary business or unitary group. Such consolidated returns tend to follow the pattern of United States Federal consolidated returns, though differences exist in the particular rules. Generally, a group of corporations in the same, similar, or integrated businesses that are under common management and operational control may be treated as a unitary group.

In a late June, 1983 decision, the US Supreme Court first sanctioned worldwide combined reporting in Container Corp. v. Franchise Tax Board (CA). The years in question were 1963-1965 and the California corporate income tax rate was 5.5%. The additional amount of tax due applying the worldwide combined reporting method was less than $72,000. The vote was 5–3, Justice John Paul Stevens did not participate.

The court's majority decision was written by Justice Brennan, joined by White, Marshall, Blackmun, and Rehnquist. Justice Powell wrote the dissenting opinion, joined by Burger and O'Connor. Friend-of-the-court amicus curiae briefs were filed in support of California by the Attorneys General of Idaho, Utah, Illinois, Montana, New Mexico, New York, North Dakota, Oregon, Alaska, Colorado, Connecticut, Delaware, Indiana, Kansas, Massachusetts, Michigan, Nebraska, Minnesota, Missouri, New Hampshire, North Carolina, Hawaii, and Vermont. Also, in support of California, briefs were filed by the National Governors' Association, the National Farmers Union, and the Citizens for Tax Justice.

In support of the Container Corporation, amicus briefs were filed by Allied Lyons, Coca-Cola, Colgate-Palmolive, EMI Limited, Firestone Tire & Rubber, Canadian Imperial Bank of Commerce, Caterpillar Tractor, Gulf Oil, Phillips Petroleum, Shell Oil, and Sony. Also, in support of Container, were briefs filed by the U.S. Chamber of Commerce's Committee on State Taxation, the Financial Executives Institute, the Government of the Kingdom of the Netherlands, the Confederation of British Industry, the International Bankers Association in California, and the Union of Industries of the European Union.

The Working Group agreed on three principles that should guide state taxation of the income of multinational corporations:

- Principle One: Water's edge unitary combination for both U.S. and foreign based companies.
- Principle Two: Increased federal administrative assistance and cooperation with the states to promote full taxpayer disclosure and accountability.
- Principle Three: Competitive balance for U.S. multinationals, foreign multinationals, and purely domestic businesses.

California adopted a requirement that both United States and foreign corporations be included in a worldwide unitary group filing, absent a “water's edge” election and fee. This requirement was limited somewhat by the U.S. Supreme Court in Barclays Bank PLC v. Franchise Tax Board. The vote in that case was 7–2 in favor of California and 9–0 in the companion Colgate-Palmolive case. California subsequently repealed the “water's edge” fee. Illinois requires unitary group filings for United States corporations only.

Under the unitary concept, all commonly controlled corporations within the unitary management and control group are required to join in a consolidated return filing for the state. An example of why a state would adopt unitary combined reporting is in the Statement of Intent in section 152 of Vermont's 2004 Act:

In recognition of the fact that corporate business is increasingly conducted on a national and international basis, it is the intent of the general assembly to adopt a unitary combined system of income tax reporting for corporations, and as an integral part of this proposal, to lower the corporate income tax rates. Vermont's separate accounting system is inadequate to measure accurately the income of a corporation with non-Vermont affiliates and creates tax disadvantages for Vermont corporations which compete with multistate and multinational corporations doing business in Vermont. It is the intent of the general assembly, in adopting a unitary combined reporting system, to put all corporations doing business in Vermont on an equal income tax footing, and with the revenue from the expanded and more accurate tax base, to lower Vermont's corporate income tax rates.

The enabling statute, however, excludes "overseas business organizations" from the taxable combined group so water's edge instead of worldwide combined reporting is adopted. Therefore, purely domestic businesses (i.e. national multi-state corporations) are subject to tax on 100% of their taxable profits, U.S. based multinational corporations are subject to tax on 100% of their reported U.S. profits plus foreign profits via repatriated dividends from foreign subsidiaries (if and when repatriated), and foreign based multinational corporations are subject to tax on 100% of their U.S. subsidiaries' reported U.S.profits. As a result, under water's edge combined reporting, separate accounting is only ignored for purely domestic businesses but retained for multinational corporations. Per the 2003-2004 Biennial Report of the Vermont Commissioner of Taxes, the adoption of unitary combined reporting "will diminish opportunities for certain aggressive tax management strategies that were available to multi-state corporations and will help create a level playing field with respect to Vermont-based corporations."

Therefore, under water's edge, U.S. based and foreign-based multinationals have the ability to shift U.S. profits to foreign subsidiaries and avoid federal and state income taxes. Profits shifted out of the U.S. would be taxed only if and when they are repatriated as foreign dividends to a U.S. based multinational. Most foreign countries do not tax foreign dividends received by multinationals based in their countries so profits shifted out of the U.S. by U.S. subsidiaries owned by foreign based multinationals and later repatriated to the foreign parent are usually not taxed.

The State of New Hampshire adopted worldwide combined reporting in 1981 but restricted it to water's edge five years later in 1986. In 1999, in Caterpillar Inc. v. New Hampshire Department of Revenue, the court stated "We point out that the water's edge method was adopted for the benefit of foreign businesses."

Approaching 30 years since the 1984 principals of the Worldwide Unitary Tax Working Group, it is questionable whether or not a competitive balance for U.S. multinationals, foreign multinationals, and purely domestic businesses has been attained. Bloomberg reporter Jesse Drucker demonstrates that separate accounting/arm's length pricing favors the multinationals in an October 2010 article titled "Google 2.4% Rate Shows How $60 Billion Lost to Loopholes" with tax strategies known as the "Double Irish" and the "Dutch Sandwich." In a New York Times October 2012 Dealbook column, Victor Fleischer wrote about "Overseas Cash And The Tax Games Multinationals Play." Although billions in corporate profits are reported to be on the books of foreign subsidiaries located in tax havens, a New York Times article by David Kocieniewski titled "For U.S. Companies, Money Offshore Mean Manhattan" dated May 2013, indicates that those corporate profits are being utilized in the U.S. This is supported by a more recent report by Kitty Richards and John Craig at the Center for American Progress titled "Offshore Corporate Profits - The Only Thing 'Trapped' is Tax Revenue" An article by Floyd Norris in the May 23, 2013 New York Times, "The Corrosive Effect of Apple's Tax Avoidance", points out how these tax avoidance strategies will most likely be followed by many other multinational corporations. And, an article by David Gelles titled "New Corporate Shelter: A Merger Abroad" dated October 8, 2013 makes a case that the best tax strategy for a U.S. based corporation is to become a foreign based corporation.

The apportionment factors for state income tax are computed on a consolidated basis and applied to the income of members doing business in the state. Illinois taxes only United States corporations in this manner. California, following the Barclays case, modified its rules to include in the combined reporting only the taxable income of United States corporations. California's computation of apportionment factors is still based on worldwide group amounts unless a “water's edge” election is made.
