= Qualified Production Activities Income =

Qualified Production Activities Income is a class of income which is entitled to favored tax treatment under Section 199 of the United States Internal Revenue Code.

== History ==
Former section 114 of the United States Internal Revenue Code excluded "extraterritorial income" which constituted "qualifying foreign trade income" under former section 941 from income. The effect of these provisions was a reduced tax burden in exchange for increased exports, creating an incentive for individuals and businesses within the United States to export. In August 2001, a panel of the World Trade Organization ruled that former section 114 of the United States Internal Revenue Code constituted a violation of the Agreement on Subsidies and Countervailing Measures as a prohibited export subsidy, and a WTO Appellate Body affirmed the finding in January 2002. The finding was based on the fact the provision resulted in the United States government forgoing revenue to which it was otherwise entitled and the fact the resulting subsidy was conditioned on export performance. The United States Congress repealed the exclusion in 2004. To offset the loss of the section 114 benefit, Congress enacted Section 199 regarding qualified production activities income.

=== Domestic Production Activities Deduction ===
In September 2021, the Domestic Production Activities Deduction (DPAD), also known as Section 199, is no longer available for tax years 2018 and beyond for most taxpayers due to changes made by the Tax Cuts and Jobs Act (TCJA). The TCJA was signed into law by President Donald Trump on December 22, 2017.

Prior to the tax year 2018, the DPAD was claimed using IRS Form 8903 and was generally equal to 9% of the lesser of a taxpayer’s qualified production activities income or taxable income. The deduction was subject to certain limitations and could not exceed 50% of the W-2 wages paid by the taxpayer during the year.

== Mechanics ==
Section 199 allows manufacturers to deduct nine percent of their "qualified production activities income" (QPAI) in 2010 and following years. The deduction is in the process of "phasing-in," with three percent of QPAI allowed as a deduction in 2005 and 2006, and six percent allowed in 2007-2009. The effect of the deduction is to reduce the rate of taxation on QPAI.

QPAI is defined as the portion of taxpayer income which is equal to the excess of the taxpayer's domestic production gross receipts over the sum of the cost of goods that are allocable to such receipts, and other expenses, losses, or deductions which are properly allocable to such receipts.

=== Domestic production gross receipts ===
Domestic production gross receipts is defined in the provision as the gross receipts of the taxpayer derived from any lease, rental, license, sale, exchange, or other disposition of:

1. tangible personal property, computer software, or sound recordings manufactured, produced, grow, or extracted by the taxpayer in whole or significant part within the United States;

2. a qualified film, defined as a non-pornographic film where not less than 50 percent of the total compensation relating to production is compensation for services performed in the United States by actors, production personnel, directors, and producers;

3. electricity, natural gas, or potable water produced by the taxpayer in the United States;

4.construction of real property performed within the United States where the taxpayer is engaged in actively conducting a construction trade or business in the ordinary course of that business; and

5. engineering or architectural services performed within the United States where the taxpayer is engaged in actively conducting an engineering or architectural trade or business and in the ordinary course of that business provides such services with respect to construction of real property with the United States.

However, domestic production gross receipts specifically do not include gross receipts derived from the sale of food or beverages at a retail establishment, from the transmission or distribution of electricity, natural gas, or potable water, or from the lease, rental, sale, exchange, or other disposition of land.

== Effect ==
The overall effect of the provision is to encourage domestic production. While this might seem to be a quite different goal than that of the provision it replaced, in theory, increased domestic production should indirectly lead to increased exports as the domestic demand is satisfied. While the QPAI deduction constitutes the United States government forgoing revenue which would otherwise be available to it, it should not run afoul of the same WTO rules because the availability of the deduction is not conditioned on export performance.

Every business in the manufacturing sector, whether small or large, should consider the manufacturing deduction under IRC § 199. While section 199 comes with a complex set of rules, it nonetheless represents a valuable tax break for businesses that perform domestic manufacturing and certain other production activities. However, businesses should weigh its benefit against the cost of calculating and supporting it. For tax years beginning in 2010 and thereafter, the benefit is fully phased in at 9% of income from qualified production activities, so more businesses may now find the effort worthwhile.

== Notes ==
1. 26 U.S.C. 199.
2. 26 U.S.C. 114 (repealed).
3. United States – Tax treatment for "Foreign Sales" Corporations, Report of the Appellate Body (WT/DS108/AB/RW)
4. Donaldson, Samuel A.; Federal Income Taxation of Individuals (Second Edition).
5. 26 U.S.C. 199(a)(1).
6. 26 U.S.C. 199(a)(2).
7. 26 U.S.C. 199(c)(1).
8. 26 U.S.C. 199(c)(4)(A)(i)(I).
9. 26 U.S.C. 199(c)(4)(A)(i)(II)and 26 U.S.C. 199(c)(6).
10. 26 U.S.C. 199(c)(4)(A)(i)(III).
11. 26 U.S.C. 199(c)(4)(A)(ii).
12. 26 U.S.C. 199(c)(4)(A)(iii).
13. 26 U.S.C. 199(c)(4)(B).
