= Dividends received deduction =

US tax deduction

The dividends-received deduction (or "DRD"), under U.S. federal income tax law, is a tax deduction received by a corporation on the dividends it receives from other corporations in which it has an ownership stake.

== Impact ==
This deduction is designed to reduce the consequences of alleged triple taxation. Otherwise, corporate profits would be taxed to the corporation that earned them, then to the corporate shareholder, and then to the individual shareholder. While Congress allowed for double taxation on corporations, it did not intend a triple - and potentially infinitely-tiered - tax to apply to corporate profits at every level of their distribution. The dividends-received deduction complements the consolidated return regulations, which allow affiliated corporations to file a single consolidated return for U.S. federal income tax purposes.

== Application ==
Generally, if a corporation receives dividends from another corporation, it is entitled to a deduction of 50 percent of the dividend it receives. If the corporation receiving the dividend owns 20 percent or more, then the amount of the deduction increases to 65 percent. If, on the other hand, the corporation receiving the dividend owns more than 80 percent of the distributing corporation, it is allowed to deduct 100 percent of the dividend it receives.

Note that in order for the deduction to apply, the corporation paying the dividend must also be liable for tax (i.e., it must be subject to the double taxation that the deduction is intended to prevent). S corporations are not eligible for a dividends received deduction, as they are considered a pass-through entity, which taxes the shareholders. Also because, S corporation shareholders may only be individuals - not corporations.

== Limitations ==
=== Taxable income limitation ===
The dividends received deduction is limited with regard to the corporate shareholder's taxable income. Per §246(b) of the IRC, a corporation with the rights to a seventy percent dividends received deduction, can deduct the dividend amount only up to seventy percent of the corporation's taxable income. Furthermore, a corporation with the rights to an eighty percent dividends received deduction can deduct the dividend amount only up to eighty percent of the corporation's taxable income. There are two exceptions to The Taxable Income Limitation. No taxable income restriction is placed on a corporation with a one-hundred percent dividends received deduction. Second, if the dividends received deduction increases or creates a net operating loss, the limitation does not apply.

For purposes of determining the appropriate dividends received deduction, a corporate shareholder's taxable income should be computed without including net operating losses (NOL's), capital loss carrybacks, and the dividends received deduction.

=== Holding period limitation ===
In order to receive the tax benefit of a dividends received deduction, a corporate shareholder must hold all shares of the distributing corporation's stock for a period of more than 45 days. Per §246(c)(1)(A), a dividends received deduction is denied under §243 with respect to any share of stock that is held by the taxpayer for 45 days or less.

The complexity of this limitation is amplified per §246(c)(4). Section 246(c)(4) states that the stock's holding period is reduced for any period in which the taxpayer has an option to sell, is under a contractual obligation to sell, or has made a short sale of substantially identical securities. In revenue ruling 94-28, the Internal Revenue Service (IRS) explains that the principle behind §246(c)(4) is to deny credit toward the 45-day holding period for any period during which the taxpayer is protected from the risk of loss inherent in the ownership of an equity interest.

=== Debt-financed dividends received limitation ===
Code Section 246A disallows the benefit of the dividends received deduction for debt financed purchases of corporate portfolio stock. As stated by the Joint Committee on Taxation, the provision reduces the deduction for dividends received on debt-financed portfolio stock. Therefore, the dividends received deduction is available only with respect to dividends “attributable” to stock financed through other means besides debt. A simple ratio is computed to determine what percentage of an investment is debt-financed. As a result, the dividends received deduction is reduced by the percentage of the investment funded by debt.

== See also ==
- Participation exemption
