= Business and occupation tax =

The business and occupation tax (often abbreviated as B&O tax or B/O tax) is a type of tax levied by the U.S. states of Washington, West Virginia, and, as of 2010, Ohio, and by municipal governments in West Virginia and Kentucky.

It is a type of gross receipts tax because it is levied on gross income, rather than net income. While deductions are not permitted for labor, materials, or other overhead expenses, the State of Washington does allow certain deductions, exemptions, and credits, by statute.

== Alabama ==
Municipalities in Alabama charge a tax on gross wages called an occupational tax. This is a tax on employers for providing jobs to the local community. The municipalities that charge the job providers are:

Attalla 2%

Auburn 1%

Bear Creek 1%

Bessemer 1%

Birmingham 1%

Brilliant 1%

Fairfield 1%

Gadsden 2%

Glencoe 2%

Goodwater 0.75%

Guin 1%

Hackleburg 1%

Haleyville 1%

Hamilton 1%

Leeds 1%

Lynn 1%

Midfield 1%

Mosses 1%

Mountain Brook 0%

Opelika 1.5%

Rainbow City 2%

Red Bay 0.5%

Shorter 1%

Southside 2%

Sulligent 1%

Tuskegee 2%

== Washington ==
=== Tax rates ===
The rate of taxation is not uniform for all businesses. Rather, different types of businesses are taxed at different rates, depending upon their classification by the Washington State Legislature and the Washington State Department of Revenue. Service industry businesses have the heaviest tax burden, with a tax rate of 1.5%, more than triple the other major classifications.

==== Major B&O Classifications and their tax rates ====
B&O Classification	Tax rate
Retailing	.00471
Wholesaling	.00484
Manufacturing	.00484
Service & Other Activities	.015

==== Specialized B&O Tax Classifications ====
B&O Classification	Tax rate
Extracting, Extracting for Hire	.00484
Slaughter, Break Processing, Perishable Meat – Wholesale; Manufacturing Wheat into Flour; Soybean & Canola Processing	.00138
Travel Agent Commission/Tour Operator; International Charter Freight Brokers; Stevedoring; Licensed Boarding Homes	.00275
Insurance Agents'/Insurance Brokers' Commissions	.00484
Prescription Drug Warehousing; Dairy Products, Bio/Alcohol Fuel, or Splitting/Processing Dried Peas	.00138
Processing for Hire; Printing and Publishing	.00484
Royalties; Child Care	.00484
Warehousing; Radio & TV Broadcasting; Public Road Construction; Government Contracting; Chemical Dependency Center	.00484
Public or Nonprofit Hospitals	.015
Cleanup of Radioactive Waste for US Government	.00471
Service & Other Activities; Gambling Contests or Chance (less than $50,000 a year)	.015
Gambling Contests of Chance ($50,000 a year or greater)	.016
Retailing of Interstate Transportation Equipment	.00484

=== Exemptions, deductions, and credits ===
Income from exempt activities need not be listed on the B&O tax return. Items claimed as deductions, however, must be listed as part of gross income before it can be taken as a deduction.

Tax credits for the B&O tax can be due to a taxpayer who overpaid his/her taxes for the prior fiscal year. Additionally, the Legislature has specially created tax credits for certain types of activities.

All exemptions, deductions, and credits are provided for by Chapter 82.04 of the Revised Code of Washington (the chapter which is the legislative basis for the B&O tax) and Title 458 of the Washington Administrative Code (the regulations of the Washington Department of Revenue). Certain provisions of these laws operate in a similar manner as the Internal Revenue Code and U.S. Treasury Regulations. For example, bad debt can be deducted from the B & O tax in much the same way as it can be deducted from the federal income tax.

== West Virginia ==
=== State level ===
At one time, West Virginia had a broad-based B&O tax at the state level similar to that in Washington. However, this tax is today collected only from public utilities, natural gas storage operators, electricity generators and synthetic fuel manufacturers. These companies are taxed at varying rates according to their business activities. Public utilities are taxed on their gross receipts, gas storage companies on their net storage, power generators on their total capacity, and synfuel manufacturers on their total synfuel sales.

=== Local level ===
Although West Virginia has largely scrapped its B&O tax at the state level, it continues to allow municipalities to collect B&O taxes of their own, and this tax is the major source of revenue for most cities in the state. According to the West Virginia State Tax Department, "This tax is imposed on the privilege of engaging in certain business activities." The West Virginia municipal B&O tax is a gross receipts tax, with no deductions whatsoever allowed. Rates vary according to the type of business, and differ from city to city.

For example:

- The state capital, Charleston, divides businesses into 14 categories for purposes of B&O taxation. Rates ranging from $0.15 per $100 gross receipts for wholesalers to $4.00 for water companies. Tax is collected on all business activity taking place within the city, regardless of where the business is domiciled, and is also collected on all gross receipts of a business domiciled in Charleston that have not been previously taxed by another local government.
- Similarly, the city of Parkersburg divides businesses into 16 different categories for B&O tax purposes, with rates ranging from $0.15 per $100 gross receipts for wholesalers to $3.60 for electric power companies' sales of electricity for domestic use and commercial lighting.

== Ohio ==
Ohio phased out its net income tax on businesses and instituted a gross receipts tax. With the phase-in completed in 2010, Ohio and Washington are the only states with a broad-based gross receipts tax on businesses. However, Ohio's B&O system has a considerably higher threshold for tax liability and lower rates than Washington's system.
