= Taxation in the United States =

Government revenue systems at all levels

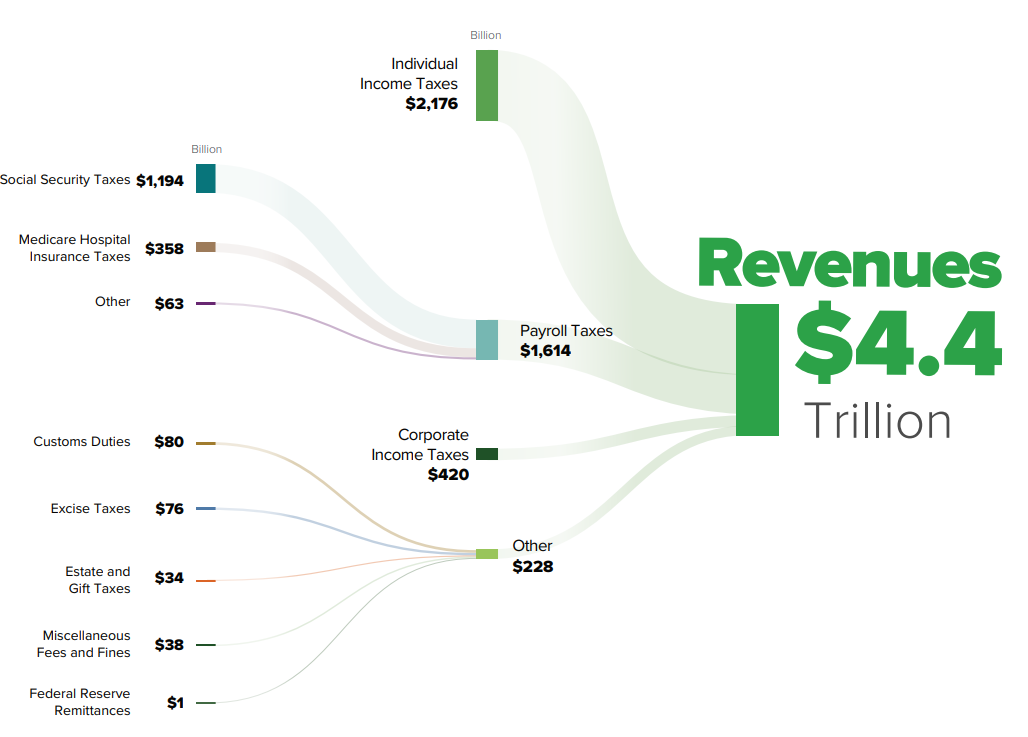
Breakdown of revenues for US Federal Government in 2023

The United States has separate federal, state, and local governments with taxes imposed at each of these levels. Taxes are levied on income, payroll, property, sales, capital gains, dividends, imports, estates and gifts, as well as various fees. In 2020, taxes collected by federal, state, and local governments amounted to 25.5% of GDP, below the OECD average of 33.5% of GDP.

U.S. tax and transfer policies are progressive and therefore reduce effective income inequality, as rates of tax generally increase as taxable income increases. As a group, the lowest earning workers, especially those with dependents, pay no income taxes and may actually receive a small subsidy from the federal government (from child credits and the earned income tax credit). Taxes fall much more heavily on labor income than on capital income. Divergent taxes and subsidies for different forms of income and spending can also constitute a form of indirect taxation of some activities over others. Taxes are imposed on net income of individuals and corporations by the federal, most state, and some local governments. Citizens and residents are taxed on worldwide income and allowed a credit for foreign taxes. Income subject to tax is determined under tax accounting rules, not financial accounting principles, and includes almost all income from whatever source, except that as a result of the enactment of the Inflation Reduction Act of 2022, large corporations are subject to a 15% minimum tax for which the starting point is annual financial statement income.

Most business expenses reduce taxable income, though limits apply to a few expenses. Individuals are permitted to reduce taxable income by personal allowances and certain non-business expenses, including home mortgage interest, state and local taxes, charitable contributions, and medical and certain other expenses incurred above certain percentages of income.

State rules for determining taxable income often differ from federal rules. Federal marginal tax rates vary from 10% to 37% of taxable income. State and local tax rates vary widely by jurisdiction, from 0% to 13.30% of income, and many are graduated. State taxes are generally treated as a deductible expense for federal tax computation, although the 2017 tax law imposed a $10,000 limit on the state and local tax ("SALT") deduction, which raised the effective tax rate on medium and high earners in high tax states. Prior to the SALT deduction limit, the average deduction exceeded $10,000 in most of the Midwest, and exceeded $11,000 in most of the Northeastern United States, as well as California and Oregon. The states impacted the most by the limit were the tri-state area (NY, NJ, and CT) and California; the average SALT deduction in those states was greater than $17,000 in 2014.

The United States is one of two countries in the world that taxes its non-resident citizens on worldwide income, in the same manner and rates as residents. The U.S. Supreme Court upheld the constitutionality of imposition of such a tax in the case of Cook v. Tait. Nevertheless, the foreign earned income exclusion eliminates U.S. taxes on the first $120,000 of annual foreign source earned income of U.S. citizens and certain U.S. residents living and working abroad (this is the inflation-adjusted amount for 2023). Payroll taxes are imposed by the federal and all state governments. These include Social Security and Medicare taxes imposed on both employers and employees, at a combined rate of 15.3% (13.3% for 2011 and 2012). Social Security tax applies only to the first $132,900 of wages in 2019. There is an additional Medicare tax of 0.9% on wages above $200,000. Employers must withhold income taxes on wages. An unemployment tax and certain other levies apply to employers. Payroll taxes have dramatically increased as a share of federal revenue since the 1950s, while corporate income taxes have fallen as a share of revenue (corporate profits have not fallen as a share of GDP).

Property taxes are imposed by most local governments and many special purpose authorities based on the fair market value of property. School and other authorities are often separately governed, and impose separate taxes. Property tax is generally imposed only on realty, though some jurisdictions tax some forms of business property. Property tax rules and rates vary widely with annual median rates ranging from 0.2% to 1.9% of a property's value depending on the state. Most states and local areas charge a sales tax when buyers purchase certain goods and services at retail. These tax rates range from 0% to 16%, and the exact amount depends on the location and the specific items being sold. The seller usually collects this money during the transaction. If the seller does not collect the sales tax, the buyer is responsible for paying a use tax directly to the government instead.

The United States imposes tariffs or customs duties on the import of many types of goods from many jurisdictions. These tariffs or duties must be paid before the goods can be legally imported. Rates of duty vary from 0% to more than 20%, based on the particular goods and country of origin. Estate and gift taxes are imposed by the federal and some state governments on the transfer of property inheritance, by will, or by lifetime donation. Similar to federal income taxes, federal estate and gift taxes are imposed on worldwide property of citizens and residents and allow a credit for foreign taxes.

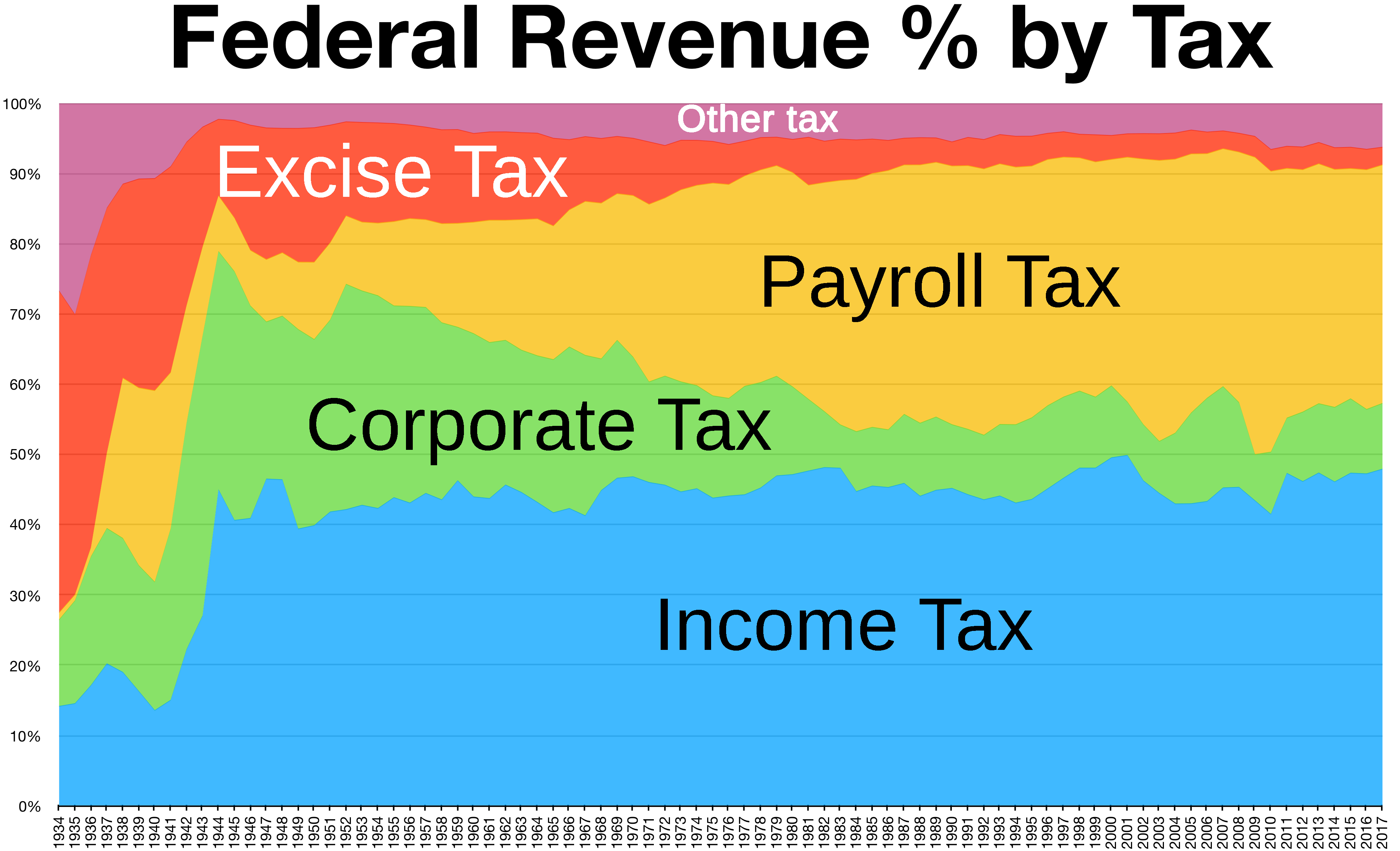
Taxes revenue by source chart history

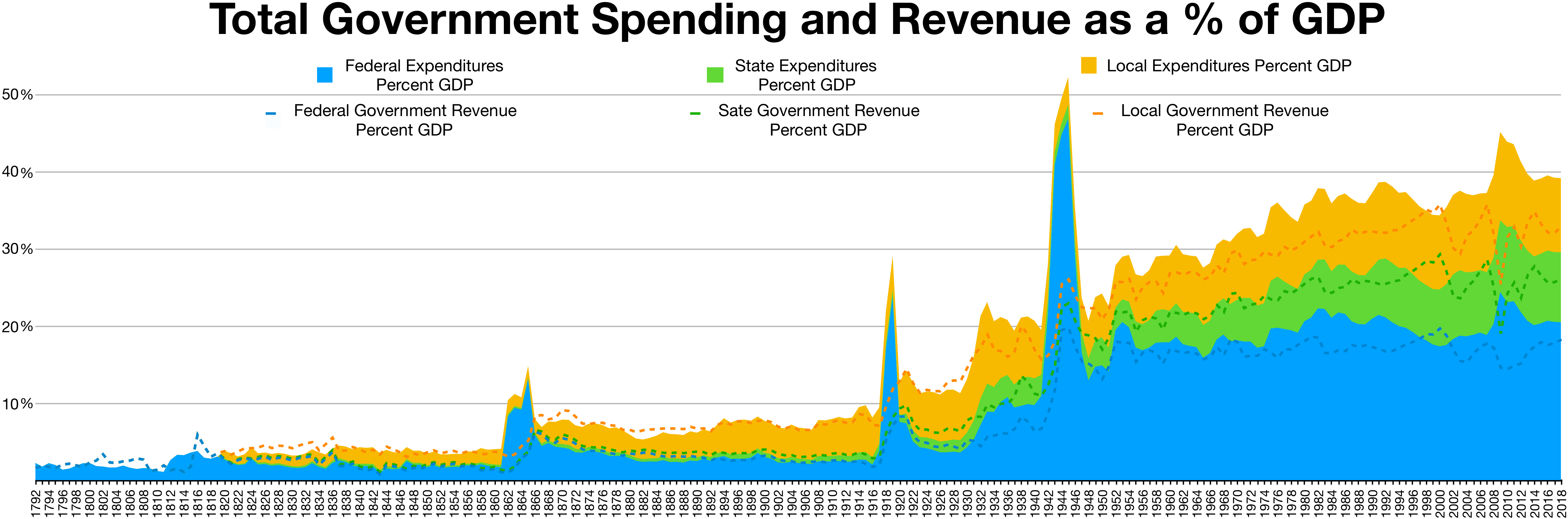

Tax Freedom Day—the calculated day on which the nation theoretically earns enough to pay its taxes—became progressively later in the 20th century but abated in the 21st century.

== Levels and types of taxation ==
The U.S. has an assortment of federal, state, local, and special-purpose governmental jurisdictions. Each imposes taxes to fully or partly fund its operations. These taxes may be imposed on the same income, property or activity, often without offset of one tax against another. The types of tax imposed at each level of government vary, in part due to constitutional restrictions. Income taxes are imposed at the federal and most state levels. Taxes on property are typically imposed only at the local level, although there may be multiple local jurisdictions that tax the same property. Other excise taxes are imposed by the federal and some state governments. Sales taxes are imposed by most states and many local governments. Customs duties or tariffs are only imposed by the federal government. A wide variety of user fees or license fees are also imposed.

== Types of taxpayers ==
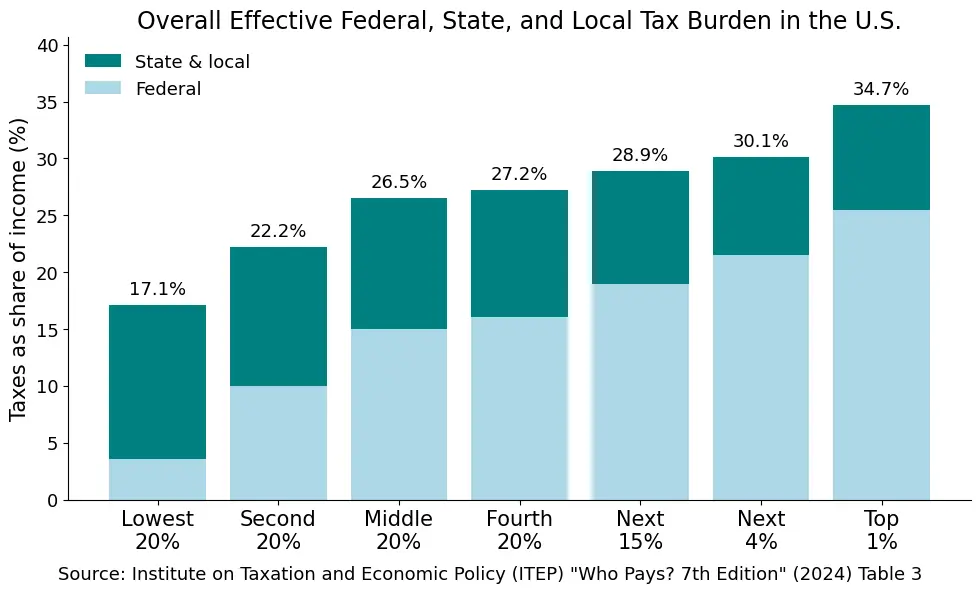
Overall tax burden in the US in 2024

Taxes may be imposed on individuals (natural persons), business entities, estates, trusts, or other forms of organization. Taxes may be based on property, income, transactions, transfers, importations of goods, business activities, or a variety of factors, and are generally imposed on the type of taxpayer for whom such tax base is relevant. Thus, property taxes tend to be imposed on property owners. In addition, certain taxes, particularly income taxes, may be imposed on the members of a business or other entity based on the income of the entity. For example, a partner is taxed on the partner's allocable share of the income of an entity that is or, under entity classification rules, is classified as a partnership. Another example relates to the grantors or beneficiaries of trusts. Yet another example relates to the United States shareholders of controlled foreign corporations.

With a few exceptions, one level of government does not impose tax on another level of government or its instrumentalities.

== Income tax ==
Taxes based on income are imposed at the federal, most state, and some local levels within the United States. The tax systems within each jurisdiction may define taxable income separately. Many states refer to some extent to federal concepts for determining taxable income.

=== History of the income tax ===
The first income tax in the United States was implemented with the Revenue Act of 1861 by Abraham Lincoln during the Civil War. In 1895 the Supreme Court ruled that the U.S. federal income tax on interest income, dividend income and rental income was unconstitutional in Pollock v. Farmers' Loan & Trust Co., because it was a direct tax. The Pollock decision was overruled by the ratification of the Sixteenth Amendment to the United States Constitution in 1913, and by subsequent U.S. Supreme Court decisions including Graves v. New York ex rel. O'Keefe, South Carolina v. Baker, and Brushaber v. Union Pacific Railroad Co.

=== Basic concepts ===
The U.S. income tax system imposes a tax based on income on individuals, corporations, estates, and trusts. The tax is taxable income, as defined, times a specified tax rate. This tax may be reduced by credits, some of which may be refunded if they exceed the tax calculated. Taxable income may differ from income for other purposes (such as for financial reporting). The definition of taxable income for federal purposes is used by many, but far from all states. Income and deductions are recognized under tax rules, and there are variations within the rules among the states. Book and tax income may differ. Income is divided into "capital gains", which are taxed at a lower rate and only when the taxpayer chooses to "realize" them, and "ordinary income", which is taxed at higher rates and on an annual basis. Because of this distinction, capital is taxed much more lightly than labor.

Under the U.S. system, individuals, corporations, estates, and trusts are subject to income tax. Partnerships are not taxed; rather, their partners are subject to income tax on their shares of income and deductions, and take their shares of credits. Some types of business entities may elect to be treated as corporations or as partnerships.

Federal receipts by source as share of total receipts (1950–2010): Individual Income Tax Payroll Taxes Corporate Income Taxes Other Taxes Excise Taxes Estate and Gift Taxes

Taxpayers are required to file tax returns and self assess tax. Tax may be withheld from payments of income (e.g., withholding of tax from wages). To the extent taxes are not covered by withholdings, taxpayers must make estimated tax payments, generally quarterly. Tax returns are subject to review and adjustment by taxing authorities, though far fewer than all returns are reviewed.

Taxable income is gross income less exemptions, deductions, and personal exemptions. Gross income includes "all income from whatever source". Certain income, however, is subject to tax exemption at the federal or state levels. This income is reduced by tax deductions including most business and some nonbusiness expenses. Individuals are also allowed a deduction for personal exemptions, a fixed dollar allowance. The allowance of some nonbusiness deductions is phased out at higher income levels.

The U.S. federal and most state income tax systems tax the worldwide income of citizens and residents. A federal foreign tax credit is granted for foreign income taxes. Individuals residing abroad may also claim the foreign earned income exclusion. Individuals may be a citizen or resident of the United States but not a resident of a state. Many states grant a similar credit for taxes paid to other states. These credits are generally limited to the amount of tax on income from foreign (or other state) sources.

In June 2025, the Puerto Rican Senate approved House Bill 505, which imposes a 4% tax on new individual beneficiaries under Law 60-2019, known as the Puerto Rican Incentives Code. The bill is part of a broader review of the tax incentive system, amid a public debate on the law's real benefits for the local economy.

=== Filing status ===
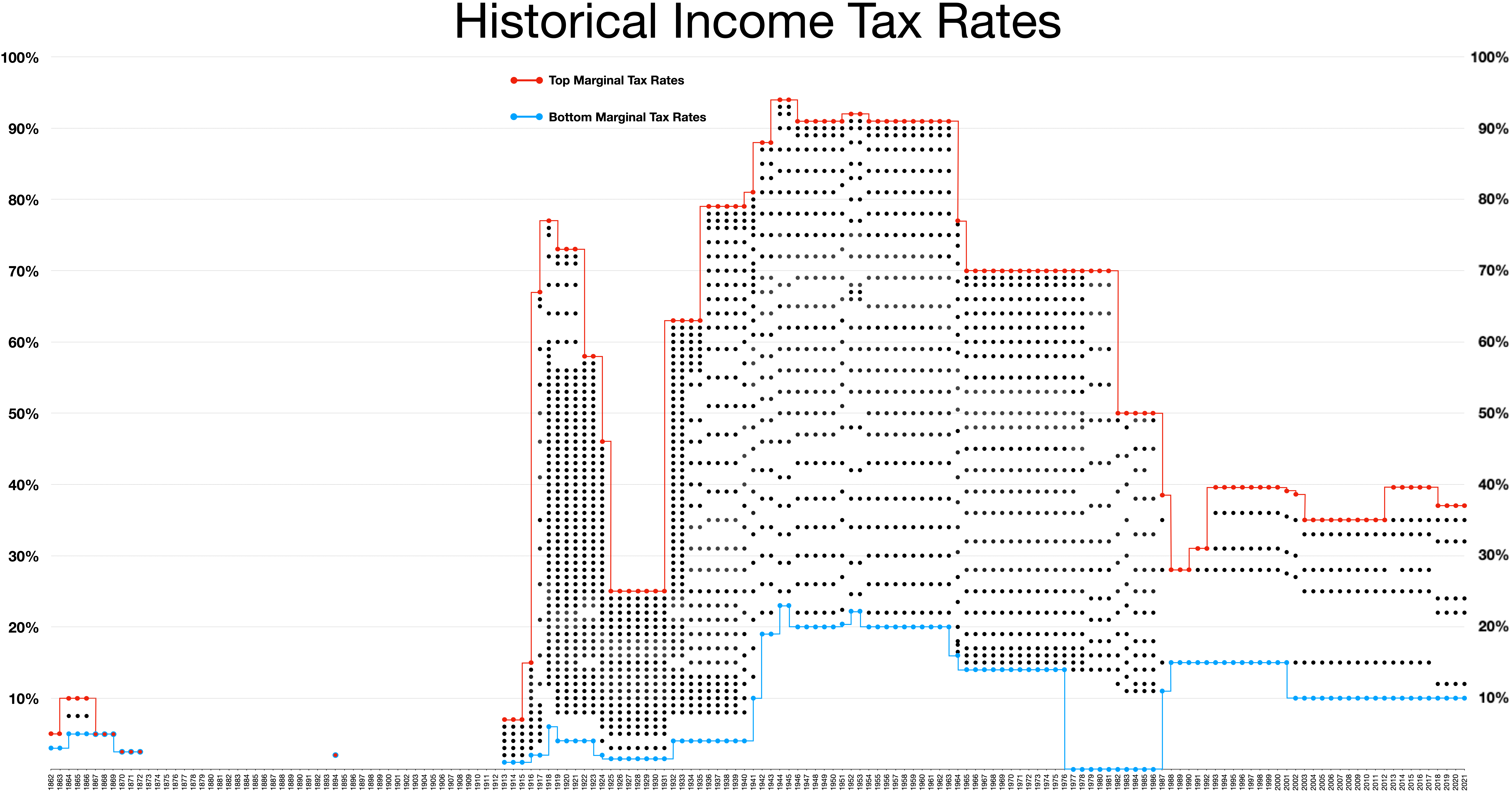
Top marginal income tax rates: Tax brackets; Lowest marginal income tax rates

Federal and state income tax is calculated, and returns filed, for each taxpayer. Two married individuals may calculate tax and file returns jointly or separately. In addition, unmarried individuals supporting children or certain other relatives may file a return as a head of household. Parent-subsidiary groups of companies may elect to file a consolidated return.

There are currently five filing statuses for filing federal individual income taxes: single, married filing jointly, married filing separately, head of household, and qualifying widow(er). The filing status used is important for determining which deductions and credits the taxpayer qualifies for. States may have different rules for determining a taxpayer's filing status, especially for people in a domestic partnership.

=== Graduated tax rates ===
Progressive effective tax burden

Income tax rates differ at the federal and state levels for corporations and individuals. Federal and many state income tax rates are higher (graduated) at higher levels of income. In addition, federal and many state individual income tax rate schedules differ based on the individual's filing status. For example, the income level at which each rate starts generally is higher (i.e., tax is lower) for married couples filing a joint return or single individuals filing as head of household.

Individuals are subject to federal graduated tax rates from 10% to 37%. Corporations are subject to a 21% federal rate of tax. Prior to 2018, the effective date of the Tax Cuts and Jobs Act of 2017, corporations were subject to federal graduated rates of tax from 15% to 35%; a rate of 34% applied to income from $335,000 to $15,000,000. State income tax rates, in states which have a tax on personal incomes, vary from 1% to 16%, including local income tax where applicable. Nine states do not have a tax on ordinary personal incomes. These include Alaska, Florida, Nevada, South Dakota, Texas, Washington, and Wyoming.

State and local taxes are generally deductible in computing federal taxable income for taxpayers who itemize their deductions; however, the Tax Cuts and Jobs Act of 2017 limited the maximum amount of the deduction to $10,000 for individuals and married couples from 2018 through 2025.

=== Income ===
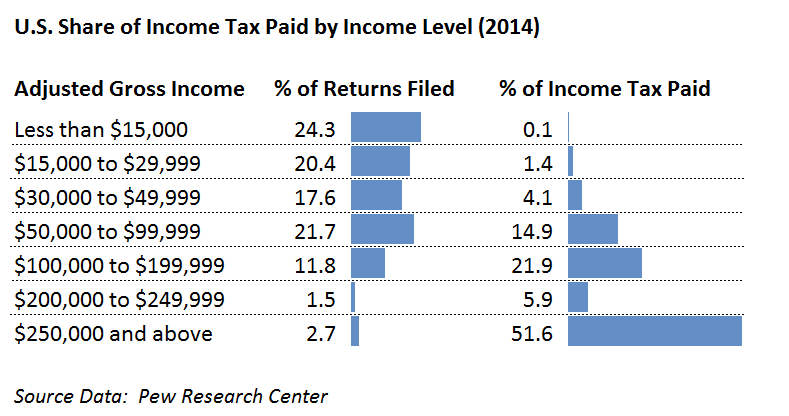
Share of income tax paid by level of income. The top 2.7% of taxpayers (those with income over $250,000) paid 51.6% of the federal income taxes in 2014.

Taxable income is gross income less adjustments and allowable tax deductions. Gross income for federal and most states is receipts and gains from all sources less cost of goods sold. Gross income includes "all income from whatever source", and is not limited to cash received. Income from illegal activities is taxable and must be reported to the IRS.

The amount of income recognized is generally the value received or which the taxpayer has a right to receive. Certain types of income are specifically excluded from gross income. The time at which gross income becomes taxable is determined under federal tax rules. This may differ in some cases from accounting rules.

Certain types of income are excluded from gross income (and therefore subject to tax exemption). The exclusions differ at federal and state levels. For federal income tax, interest income on state and local bonds is exempt, while few states exempt any interest income except from municipalities within that state. In addition, certain types of receipts, such as gifts and inheritances, and certain types of benefits, such as employer-provided health insurance, are excluded from income.

Foreign non-resident persons are taxed only on income from U.S. sources or from a U.S. business. Tax on foreign non-resident persons on non-business income is at 30% of the gross income, but reduced under many tax treaties.

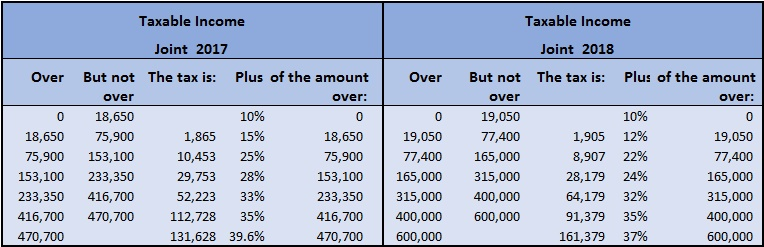

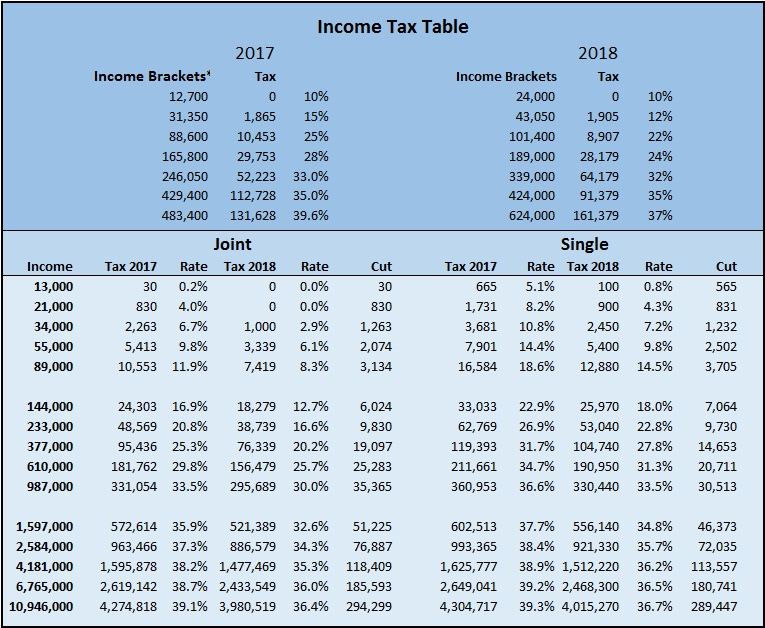

These brackets are the taxable income plus the standard deduction for a joint return. That deduction is the first bracket. For example, a couple earning $88,600 by September owes $10,453; $1,865 for 10% of the income from $12,700 to $31,500, plus $8,588 for 15% of the income from $31,500 to $88,600. Now, for every $100 they earn, $25 is taxed until they reach the next bracket.

After making $400 more; going down to the 89,000 row the tax is $100 more. The next column is the tax divided by 89,000. The new law is the next column. This tax equals 10% of their income from $24,000 to $43,050 plus 12% from $43,050 to $89,000. The singles' sets of markers can be set up quickly. The brackets with its tax are cut in half.

Itemizers can figure the tax without moving the scale by taking the difference off the top. The couple above, having receipts for $22,700 in deductions, means that the last $10,000 of their income is tax free. After seven years the papers can be destroyed; if unchallenged.

Source and Method

=== Deductions and exemptions ===
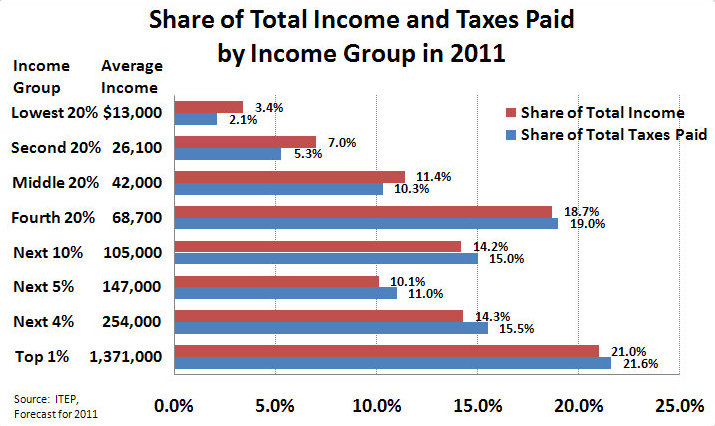
The share of total income and federal, state and local taxes paid by income group. Total taxes include income taxes, payroll taxes, state and local sales taxes, federal and state excise taxes, and local property taxes.

The U.S. system allows reduction of taxable income for both business and some nonbusiness expenditures, called deductions. Businesses selling goods reduce gross income directly by the cost of goods sold. In addition, businesses may deduct most types of expenses incurred in the business. Some of these deductions are subject to limitations. For example, only 50% of the amount incurred for any meals or entertainment may be deducted. The amount and timing of deductions for business expenses is determined under the taxpayer's tax accounting method, which may differ from methods used in accounting records.

Some types of business expenses are deductible over a period of years rather than when incurred. These include the cost of long lived assets such as buildings and equipment. The cost of such assets is recovered through deductions for depreciation or amortization.

In addition to business expenses, individuals may reduce income by an allowance for personal exemptions and either a fixed standard deduction or itemized deductions. One personal exemption is allowed per taxpayer, and additional such deductions are allowed for each child or certain other individuals supported by the taxpayer. The standard deduction amount varies by taxpayer filing status. Itemized deductions by individuals include home mortgage interest, state and local taxes, certain other taxes, contributions to recognized charities, medical expenses in excess of 7.5% of adjusted gross income, and certain other amounts.

Personal exemptions, the standard deduction, and itemized deductions are limited (phased out) above certain income levels.

=== Business entities ===
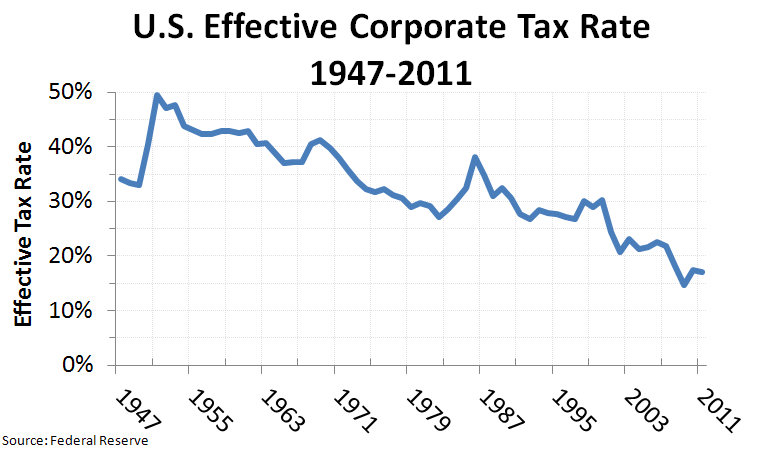
The U.S. federal effective corporate income tax rate is lower than the highest nominal rate, which can be significant in part because of tax shelters such as tax havens.

Corporations must pay tax on their taxable income independently of their shareholders. Shareholders are also subject to tax on dividends received from corporations. By contrast, partnerships are not subject to income tax, but their partners calculate their taxes by including their shares of partnership items. Corporations owned entirely by U.S. citizens or residents (S corporations) may elect to be treated similarly to partnerships. A limited liability company and certain other business entities may elect to be treated as corporations or as partnerships. States generally follow such characterization. Many states also allow corporations to elect S corporation status. Charitable organizations are subject to tax on business income.

Certain transactions of business entities are not subject to tax. These include many types of formation or reorganization.

=== Credits ===
A wide variety of tax credits may reduce income tax at the federal and state levels. Some credits are available only to individuals, such as the child tax credit for each dependent child, American Opportunity Tax Credit for education expenses, or the Earned Income Tax Credit for low income wage earners. Some credits, such as the Work Opportunity Tax Credit, are available to businesses, including various special industry incentives. A few credits, such as the foreign tax credit, are available to all types of taxpayers.

=== Payment or withholding of taxes ===
The United States federal and state income tax systems are self-assessment systems. Taxpayers must declare and pay tax without assessment by the taxing authority. Quarterly payments of tax estimated to be due are required to the extent taxes are not paid through withholdings. The second and fourth "quarters" are not a quarter of a year in length. The second "quarter" is two months (April and May) and the fourth is four months (September to December). (Estimated taxes used to be paid based on a calendar quarter, but in the 60's the October due date was moved back to September to pull the third quarter cash receipts into the previous federal budget year which begins on October 1 every year, allowing the federal government to begin the year with a current influx of cash.) Employers must withhold income tax, as well as Social Security and Medicare taxes, from wages. Amounts to be withheld are computed by employers based on representations of tax status by employees on Form W-4, with limited government review.

=== State variations ===
Composition of state and local government tax revenue for sample state of Ohio, 2007

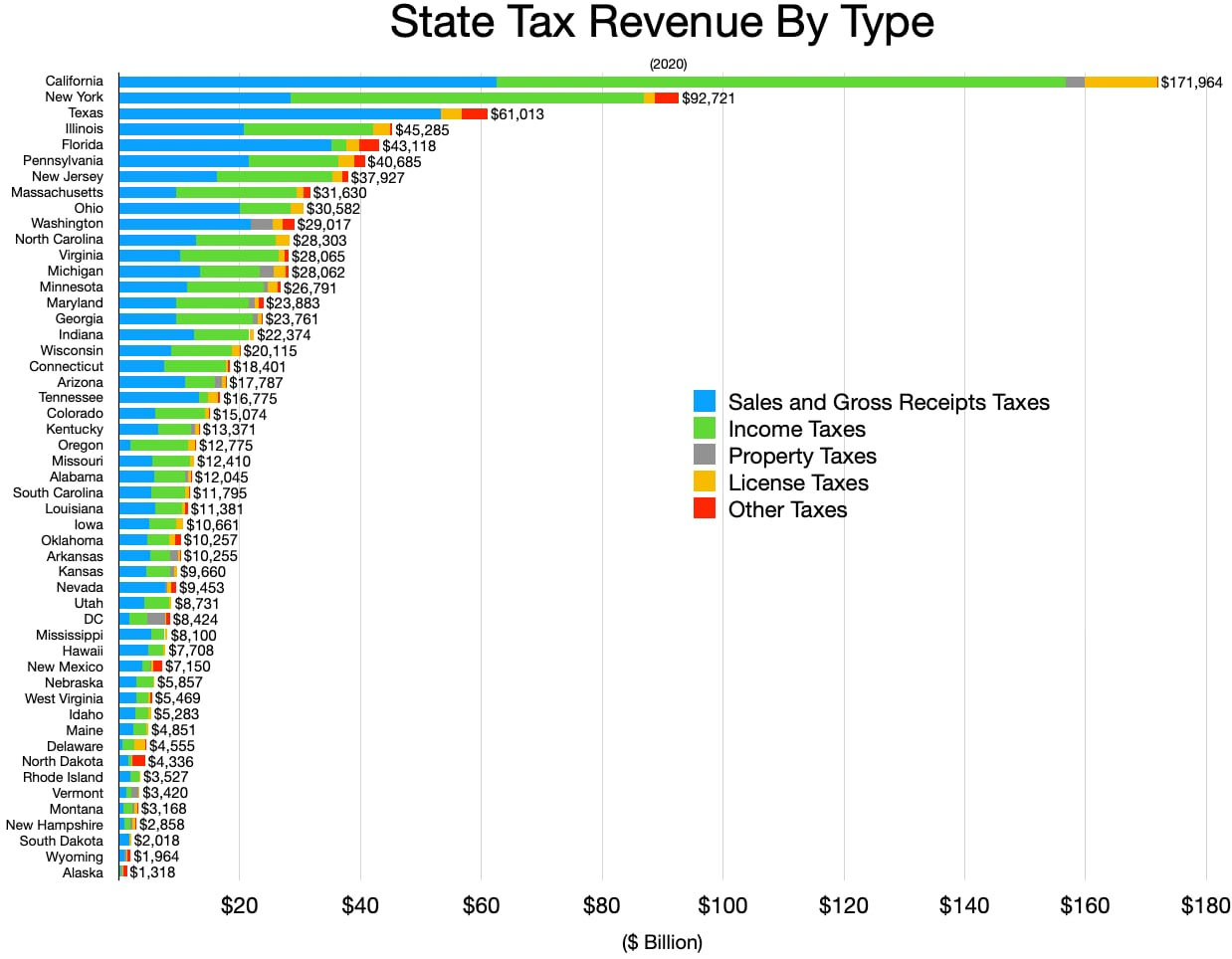
Total State Government Tax Revenue By Type in 2020

Forty-three states and many localities in the U.S. impose an income tax on individuals. Forty-seven states and many localities impose a tax on the income of corporations. Tax rates vary by state and locality, and may be fixed or graduated. Most rates are the same for all types of income. State and local income taxes are imposed in addition to federal income tax. State income tax is allowed as a deduction in computing federal income, but is capped at $10,000 per household since the passage of the 2017 tax law. Prior to the change, the average deduction exceeded $10,000 in most of the Midwest, most of the Northeast, as well as California and Oregon.

State and local taxable income is determined under state law, and often is based on federal taxable income. Most states conform to many federal concepts and definitions, including defining income and business deductions and timing thereof. State rules vary widely regarding to individual itemized deductions. Most states do not allow a deduction for state income taxes for individuals or corporations, and impose tax on certain types of income exempt at the federal level.

Some states have alternative measures of taxable income, or alternative taxes, especially for corporations.

States imposing an income tax generally tax all income of corporations organized in the state and individuals residing in the state. Taxpayers from another state are subject to tax only on income earned in the state or apportioned to the state. Businesses are subject to income tax in a state only if they have sufficient nexus in (connection to) the state.

=== Non-residents ===
Foreign individuals and corporations not resident in the United States are subject to federal income tax only on income from a U.S. business and certain types of income from U.S. sources. States tax individuals resident outside the state and corporations organized outside the state only on wages or business income within the state. Payers of some types of income to non-residents must withhold federal or state income tax on the payment. Federal withholding of 30% on such income may be reduced under a tax treaty. Such treaties do not apply to state taxes.

=== Alternative tax bases (AMT, states) ===
An alternative minimum tax (AMT) is imposed at the federal level on a somewhat modified version of taxable income. The tax applies to individuals and corporations. The tax base is adjusted gross income reduced by a fixed deduction that varies by taxpayer filing status. Itemized deductions of individuals are limited to home mortgage interest, charitable contributions, and a portion of medical expenses. AMT is imposed at a rate of 26% or 28% for individuals and 20% for corporations, less the amount of regular tax. A credit against future regular income tax is allowed for such excess, with certain restrictions.

Many states impose minimum income taxes on corporations or a tax computed on an alternative tax base. These include taxes based on the capital of corporations and alternative measures of income for individuals. Details vary widely by state.

=== Differences between book and taxable income for businesses ===
In the United States, taxable income is computed under rules that differ materially from U.S. generally accepted accounting principles. Since only publicly traded companies are required to prepare financial statements, many non-public companies opt to keep their financial records under tax rules. Corporations that present financial statements using other than tax rules must include a detailed reconciliation of their financial statement income to their taxable income as part of their tax returns. Key areas of difference include depreciation and amortization, timing of recognition of income or deductions, assumptions for cost of goods sold, and certain items (such as meals and entertainment) the tax deduction for which is limited.

=== Reporting under self-assessment system ===
Income taxes in the United States are self-assessed by taxpayers by filing required tax returns. Taxpayers, as well as certain non-tax-paying entities, like partnerships, must file annual tax returns at the federal and applicable state levels. These returns disclose a complete computation of taxable income under tax principles. Taxpayers compute all income, deductions, and credits themselves, and determine the amount of tax due after applying required prepayments and taxes withheld. Federal and state tax authorities provide preprinted forms that must be used to file tax returns. IRS Form 1040 series is required for individuals, Form 1120 series for corporations, Form 1065 for partnerships, and Form 990 series for tax exempt organizations.

The state forms vary widely, and rarely correspond to federal forms. Tax returns vary from the two-page (Form 1040EZ) used by nearly 70% of individual filers to thousands of pages of forms and attachments for large entities. Groups of corporations may elect to file consolidated returns at the federal level and with a few states. Electronic filing of federal and many state returns is widely encouraged and in some cases required, and many vendors offer computer software for use by taxpayers and paid return preparers to prepare and electronically file returns.

== Capital gains tax ==
U.S. capital gains taxes history

Individuals and corporations pay U.S. federal income tax on the net total of all their capital gains. The tax rate depends on both the investor's tax bracket and the amount of time the investment was held. Short-term capital gains are taxed at the investor's ordinary income tax rate and are defined as investments held for a year or less before being sold. Long-term capital gains, on dispositions of assets held for more than one year, are taxed at a lower rate.

== Payroll taxes ==
Payroll taxes were among the most regressive in 2010.

In the United States, payroll taxes are assessed by the federal government, many states, the District of Columbia, and numerous cities. These taxes are imposed on employers and employees and on various compensation bases. They are collected and paid to the taxing jurisdiction by the employers. Most jurisdictions imposing payroll taxes require reporting quarterly and annually in most cases, and electronic reporting is generally required for all but small employers. Because payroll taxes are imposed only on wages and not on income from investments, taxes on labor income are much heavier than taxes on income from capital.

=== Income tax withholding ===
Federal, state, and local withholding taxes are required in those jurisdictions imposing an income tax. Employers having contact with the jurisdiction must withhold the tax from wages paid to their employees in those jurisdictions. Computation of the amount of tax to withhold is performed by the employer based on representations by the employee regarding his/her tax status on IRS Form W-4. Amounts of income tax so withheld must be paid to the taxing jurisdiction, and are available as refundable tax credits to the employees. Income taxes withheld from payroll are not final taxes, merely prepayments. Employees must still file income tax returns and self assess tax, claiming amounts withheld as payments.

=== Social Security and Medicare taxes ===
Federal social insurance taxes are imposed equally on employers and employees, consisting of a tax of 6.2% of wages up to an annual wage maximum ($132,900 in 2019) for Social Security plus a tax of 1.45% of total wages for Medicare. For 2011, the employee's contribution was reduced to 4.2%, while the employer's portion remained at 6.2%. There is an additional Medicare tax of 0.9% on wages over $200,000, to be paid only by the employee (reported separately on the employee's tax return on Form 8959). To the extent an employee's portion of the 6.2% tax exceeds the maximum by reason of multiple employers (each of whom will collect up to the annual wage maximum), the employee is entitled to a refundable tax credit upon filing an income tax return for the year.

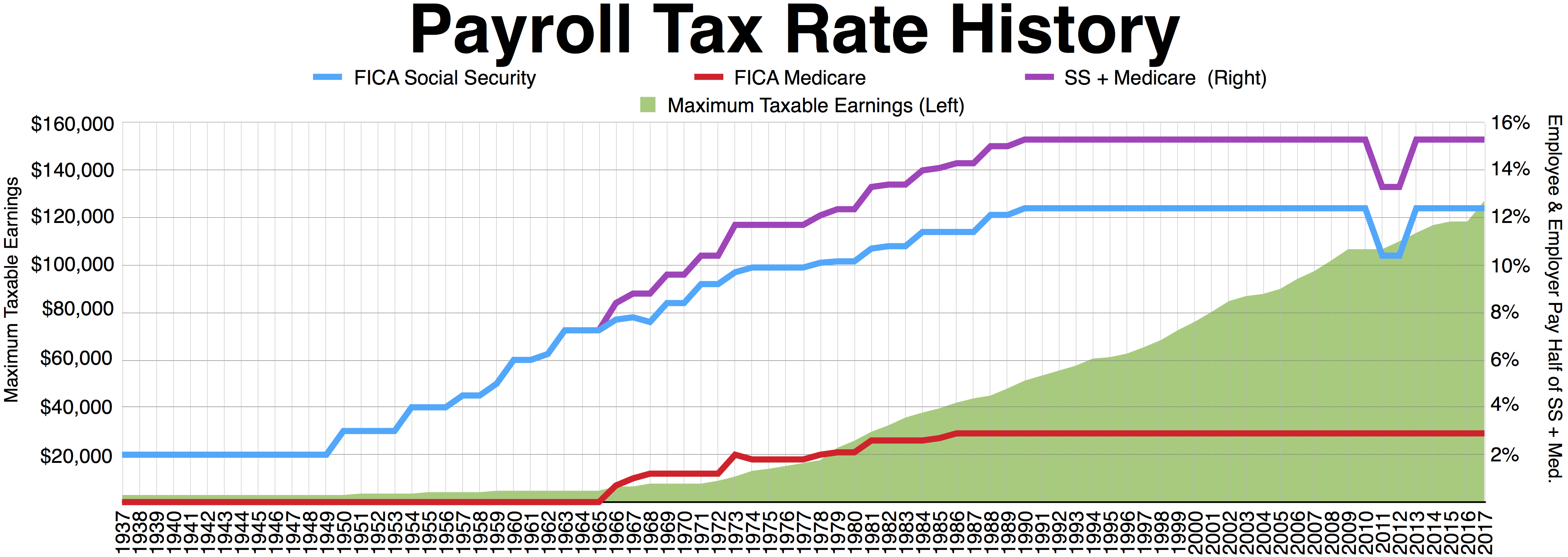
Payroll tax rates history

=== Unemployment taxes ===
Employers are subject to unemployment taxes by the federal and all state governments. The tax is a percentage of taxable wages with a cap. The tax rate and cap vary by jurisdiction and by employer's industry and experience rating. For 2009, the typical maximum tax per employee was under $1,000. Some states also impose unemployment, disability insurance, or similar taxes on employees.

=== Reporting and payment ===
Employers must report payroll taxes to the appropriate taxing jurisdiction in the manner each jurisdiction provides. Quarterly reporting of aggregate income tax withholding and Social Security taxes is required in most jurisdictions. Employers must file reports of aggregate unemployment tax quarterly and annually with each applicable state, and annually at the federal level.

Each employer is required to provide each employee an annual report on IRS Form W-2 of wages paid and federal, state and local taxes withheld, with a copy sent to the IRS and the taxation authority of the state. These are due by January 31 and February 28 (March 31 if filed electronically), respectively, following the calendar year in which wages are paid. The Form W-2 constitutes proof of payment of tax for the employee.

Employers are required to pay payroll taxes to the taxing jurisdiction under varying rules, in many cases within 1 banking day. Payment of federal and many state payroll taxes is required to be made by electronic funds transfer if certain dollar thresholds are met, or by deposit with a bank for the benefit of the taxing jurisdiction.

=== Penalties ===
Failure to timely and properly pay federal payroll taxes results in an automatic penalty of 2% to 10%. Similar state and local penalties apply. Failure to properly file monthly or quarterly returns may result in additional penalties. Failure to file Forms W-2 results in an automatic penalty of up to $50 per form not timely filed. State and local penalties vary by jurisdiction.

A particularly severe penalty applies where federal income tax withholding and Social Security taxes are not paid to the IRS. The penalty of up to 100% of the amount not paid can be assessed against the employer entity as well as any person (such as a corporate officer) having control or custody of the funds from which payment should have been made.

== Sales and excise taxes ==
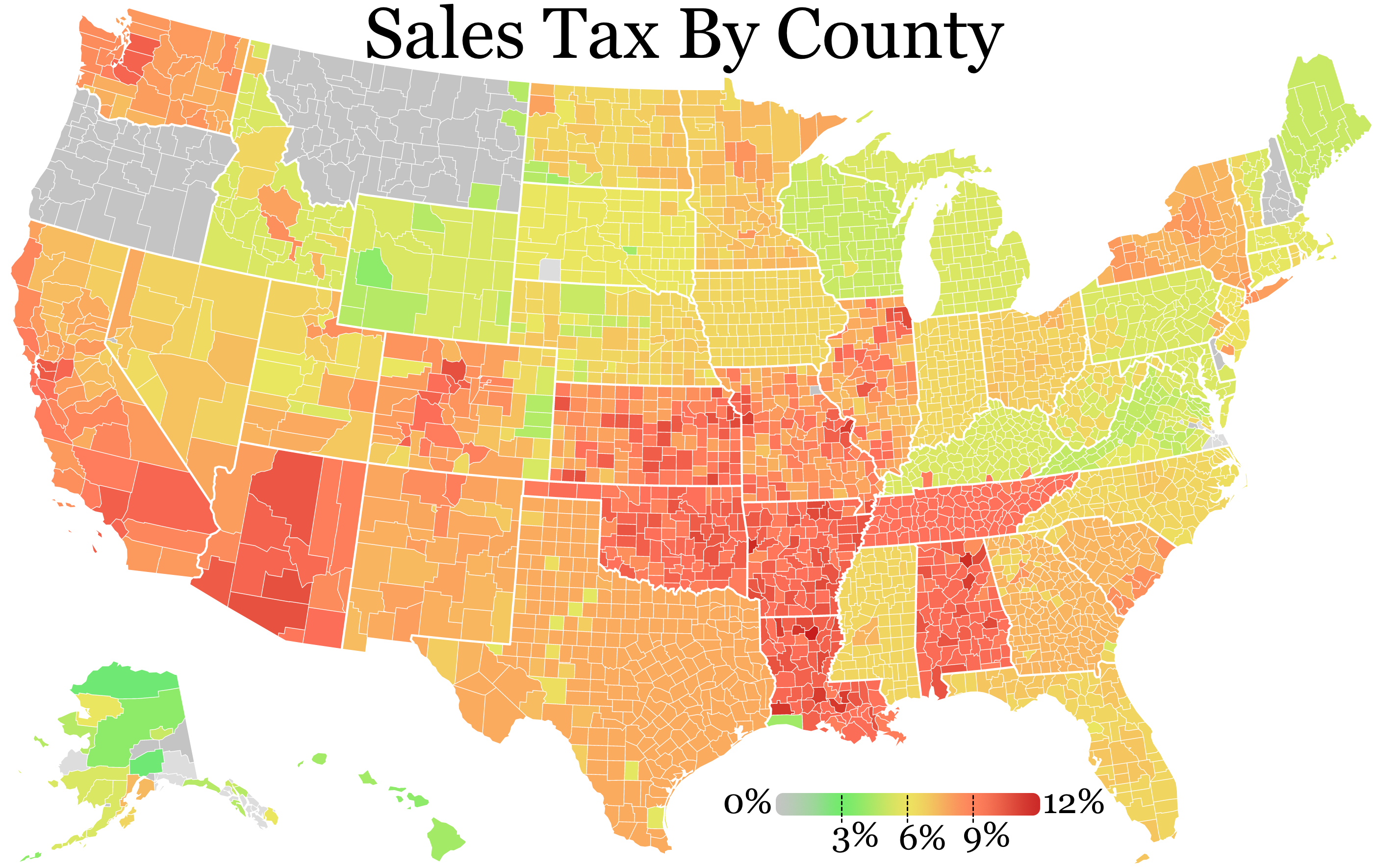
0% 3% 6% 9% 12%

=== Sales and use tax ===
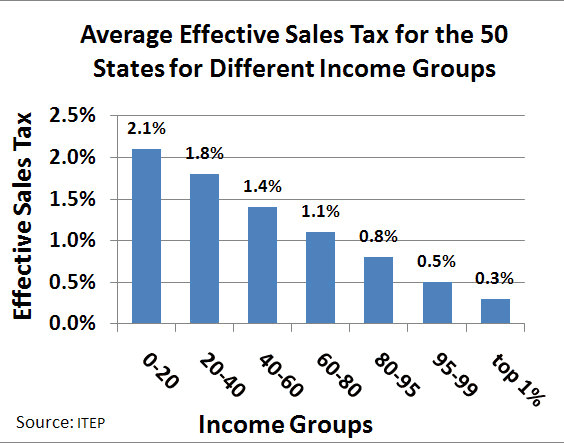
The average effective sales tax for different income groups of the combined 50 States (2007)

There is no federal sales or use tax in the United States. All but five states impose sales and use taxes on retail sale, lease and rental of many goods, as well as some services. Many cities, counties, transit authorities and special purpose districts impose an additional local sales or use tax. Sales and use tax is calculated as the purchase price times the appropriate tax rate. Tax rates vary widely by jurisdiction from less than 1% to over 10%. Sales tax is collected by the seller at the time of sale. Use tax is self assessed by a buyer who has not paid sales tax on a taxable purchase.

Unlike value added tax, sales tax is imposed only once, at the retail level, on any particular goods. Nearly all jurisdictions provide numerous categories of goods and services that are exempt from sales tax, or taxed at a reduced rate. Purchase of goods for further manufacture or for resale is uniformly exempt from sales tax. Most jurisdictions exempt food sold in grocery stores, prescription medications, and many agricultural supplies. Generally cash discounts, including coupons, are not included in the price used in computing tax.

Sales taxes, including those imposed by local governments, are generally administered at the state level. States imposing sales tax require retail sellers to register with the state, collect tax from customers, file returns, and remit the tax to the state. Procedural rules vary widely. Sellers generally must collect tax from in-state purchasers unless the purchaser provides an exemption certificate. Most states allow or require electronic remittance of tax to the state. States are prohibited from requiring out of state sellers to collect tax unless the seller has some minimal connection with the state.

=== Excise taxes ===
Excise taxes may be imposed on the sales price of goods or on a per unit or other basis, in theory to discourage consumption of the taxed goods or services. Excise tax may be required to be paid by the manufacturer at wholesale sale, or may be collected from the customer at retail sale. Excise taxes are imposed at the federal and state levels on a variety of goods, including alcohol, tobacco, tires, gasoline, diesel fuel, coal, firearms, telephone service, air transportation, unregistered bonds, and many other goods and services. Some jurisdictions require that tax stamps be affixed to goods to demonstrate payment of the tax.

== Property taxes ==
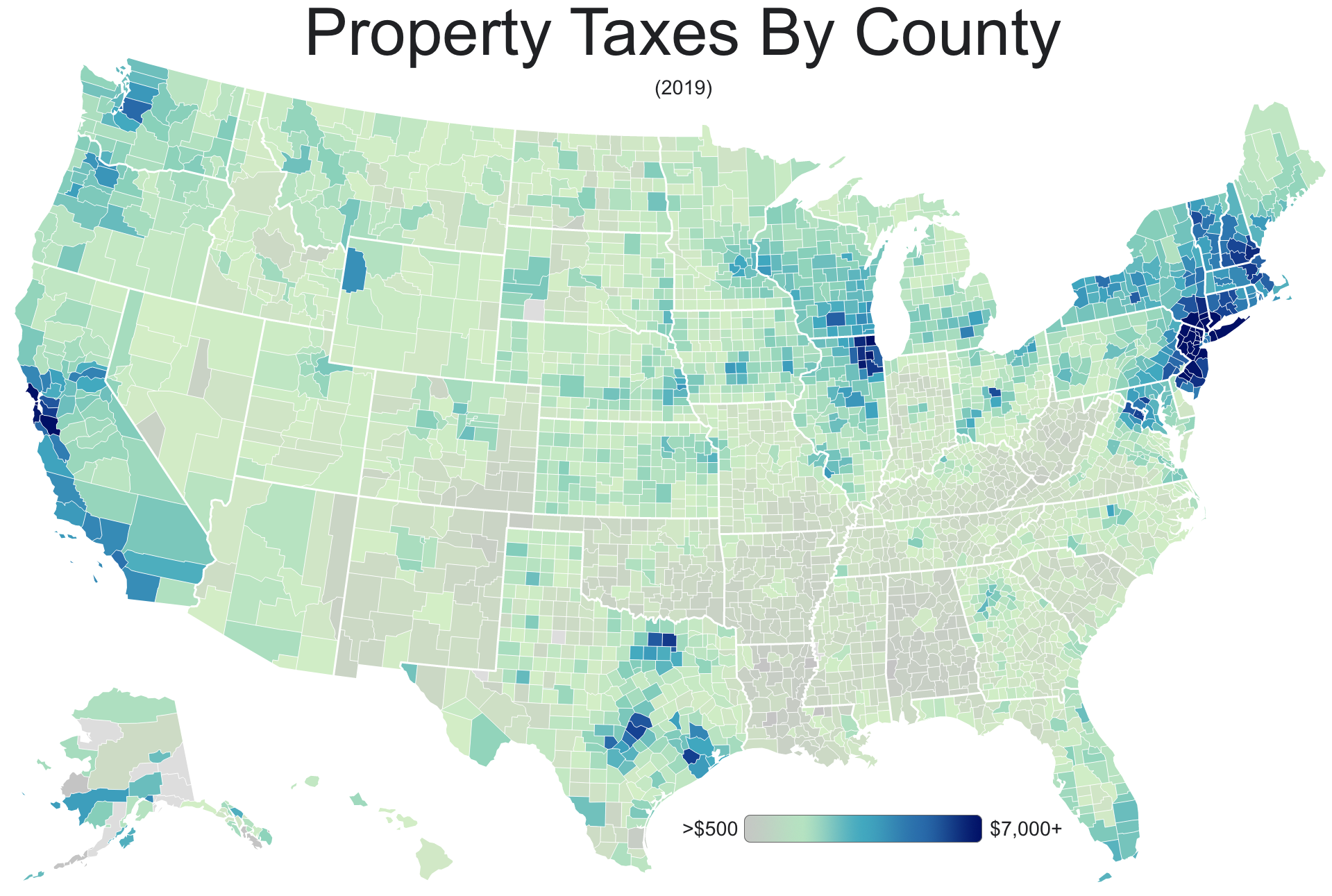
Median property tax paid by county -$500, $1,000, $2,000, $3,000, $4,000, $5,000, $6,000, $7,000+

Most jurisdictions below the state level in the United States impose a tax on interests in real property (land, buildings, and permanent improvements). Some jurisdictions also tax some types of business personal property. Rules vary widely by jurisdiction. Many overlapping jurisdictions (counties, cities, school districts) may have authority to tax the same property. Few states impose a tax on the value of property.

Property tax is based on fair market value of the subject property. The amount of tax is determined annually based on the market value of each property on a particular date, and most jurisdictions require redeterminations of value periodically. The tax is computed as the determined market value times an assessment ratio times the tax rate. Assessment ratios and tax rates vary widely among jurisdictions, and may vary by type of property within a jurisdiction. Where a property has recently been sold between unrelated sellers, such sale establishes fair market value. In other (i.e., most) cases, the value must be estimated. Common estimation techniques include comparable sales, depreciated cost, and an income approach. Property owners may also declare a value, which is subject to change by the tax assessor.

=== Types of property taxed ===
Property taxes are most commonly applied to real estate and business property. Real property generally includes all interests considered under that state's law to be ownership interests in land, buildings, and improvements. Ownership interests include ownership of title as well as certain other rights to property. Automobile and boat registration fees are a subset of this tax. Other nonbusiness goods are generally not subject to property tax, though Virginia maintains a unique personal property tax on all motor vehicles, including non-business vehicles.

=== Assessment and collection ===
The assessment process varies by state, and sometimes within a state. Each taxing jurisdiction determines values of property within the jurisdiction and then determines the amount of tax to assess based on the value of the property. Tax assessors for taxing jurisdictions are generally responsible for determining property values. The determination of values and calculation of tax is generally performed by an official referred to as a tax assessor. Property owners have rights in each jurisdiction to declare or contest the value so determined. Property values generally must be coordinated among jurisdictions, and such coordination is often performed by equalization.

Once value is determined, the assessor typically notifies the last known property owner of the value determination. After values are settled, property tax bills or notices are sent to property owners. Payment times and terms vary widely. If a property owner fails to pay the tax, the taxing jurisdiction has various remedies for collection, in many cases including seizure and sale of the property. Property taxes constitute a lien on the property to which transfers are also subject. Mortgage companies often collect taxes from property owners and remit them on behalf of the owner.

== Customs duties ==
The United States imposes tariffs or customs duties on imports of goods. The duty is levied at the time of import and is paid by the importer of record. Customs duties vary by country of origin and product. Goods from many countries are exempt from duty under various trade agreements. Certain types of goods are exempt from duty regardless of source. Customs rules differ from other import restrictions. Failure to properly comply with customs rules can result in seizure of goods and criminal penalties against involved parties. United States Customs and Border Protection ("CBP") enforces customs rules.

=== Import of goods ===
Goods may be imported to the United States subject to import restrictions. Importers of goods may be subject to tax ("customs duty" or "tariff") on the imported value of the goods. "Imported goods are not legally entered until after the shipment has arrived within the port of entry, delivery of the merchandise has been authorized by CBP, and estimated duties have been paid." Importation and declaration and payment of customs duties is done by the importer of record, which may be the owner of the goods, the purchaser, or a licensed customs broker. Goods may be stored in a bonded warehouse or a Foreign-Trade Zone in the United States for up to five years without payment of duties. Goods must be declared for entry into the U.S. within 15 days of arrival or prior to leaving a bonded warehouse or foreign trade zone. Many importers participate in a voluntary self-assessment program with CBP. Special rules apply to goods imported by mail. All goods imported into the United States are subject to inspection by CBP. Some goods may be temporarily imported to the United States under a system similar to the ATA Carnet system. Examples include laptop computers used by persons traveling in the U.S. and samples used by salesmen.

=== Origin ===
Rates of tax on transaction values vary by country of origin. Goods must be individually labeled to indicate country of origin, with exceptions for specific types of goods. Goods are considered to originate in the country with the highest rate of duties for the particular goods unless the goods meet certain minimum content requirements. Extensive modifications to normal duties and classifications apply to goods originating in Canada or Mexico under the [North American Free Trade Agreement].

=== Classification ===
All goods that are not exempt are subject to duty computed according to the Harmonized Tariff Schedule published by CBP and the U.S. International Trade Commission. This lengthy schedule provides rates of duty for each class of goods. Most goods are classified based on the nature of the goods, though some classifications are based on use.

=== Duty rate ===
Customs duty rates may be expressed as a percentage of value or dollars and cents per unit. Rates based on value vary from zero to 20% in the 2011 schedule. Rates may be based on relevant units for the particular type of goods (per ton, per kilogram, per square meter, etc.). Some duties are based in part on value and in part on quantity.

Where goods subject to different rates of duty are commingled, the entire shipment may be taxed at the highest applicable duty rate.

=== Procedures ===
Imported goods are generally accompanied by a bill of lading or air waybill describing the goods. For purposes of customs duty assessment, they must also be accompanied by an invoice documenting the transaction value. The goods on the bill of lading and invoice are classified and duty is computed by the importer or CBP. The amount of this duty is payable immediately, and must be paid before the goods can be imported. Most assessments of goods are now done by the importer and documentation filed with CBP electronically.

After duties have been paid, CBP approves the goods for import. They can then be removed from the port of entry, bonded warehouse, or Free-Trade Zone.

After duty has been paid on particular goods, the importer can seek a refund of duties if the goods are exported without substantial modification. The process of claiming a refund is known as duty drawback.

=== Penalties ===
Certain civil penalties apply for failures to follow CBP rules and pay duty. Goods of persons subject to such penalties may be seized and sold by CBP. In addition, criminal penalties may apply for certain offenses. Criminal penalties may be as high as twice the value of the goods plus twenty years in jail.

=== Foreign-trade zones ===
Foreign-trade zones are secure areas physically in the United States but legally outside the customs territory of the United States. Such zones are generally near ports of entry. They may be within the warehouse of an importer. Such zones are limited in scope and operation based on approval of the Foreign-Trade Zones Board. Goods in a foreign-trade zone are not considered imported to the United States until they leave the zone. Foreign goods may be used to manufacture other goods within the zone for export without payment of customs duties.

== Estate and gift taxes ==
Estate and gift taxes in the United States are imposed by the federal and some state governments. The estate tax is an excise tax levied on the right to pass property at death. It is imposed on the estate, not the beneficiary. Some states impose an inheritance tax on recipients of bequests. Gift taxes are levied on the giver (donor) of property where the property is transferred for less than adequate consideration. An additional generation-skipping transfer (GST) tax is imposed by the federal and some state governments on transfers to grandchildren (or their descendants).

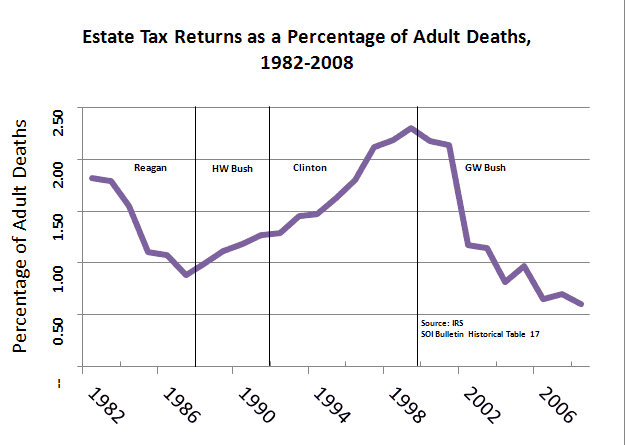
Estate tax returns as a percentage of adult deaths, 1982–2008.

The federal gift tax is applicable to the donor, not the recipient, and is computed based on cumulative taxable gifts, and is reduced by prior gift taxes paid. The federal estate tax is computed on the sum of taxable estate and taxable gifts, and is reduced by prior gift taxes paid. These taxes are computed as the taxable amount times a graduated tax rate (up to 35% in 2011). The estate and gift taxes are also reduced by a major "unified credit" equivalent to an exclusion ($5 million in 2011). Rates and exclusions have varied, and the benefits of lower rates and the credit have been phased out during some years.

Taxable gifts are certain gifts of U.S. property by nonresident aliens, most gifts of any property by citizens or residents, in excess of an annual exclusion ($13,000 for gifts made in 2011) per donor per donee. Taxable estates are certain U.S. property of non-resident alien decedents, and most property of citizens or residents. For aliens, residence for estate tax purposes is primarily based on domicile, but U.S. citizens are taxed regardless of their country of residence. U.S. real estate and most tangible property in the U.S. are subject to estate and gift tax whether the decedent or donor is resident or nonresident, citizen or alien.

The taxable amount of a gift is the fair market value of the property in excess of consideration received at the date of gift. The taxable amount of an estate is the gross fair market value of all rights considered property at the date of death (or an alternative valuation date) ("gross estate"), less liabilities of the decedent, costs of administration (including funeral expenses) and certain other deductions, see Stepped-up basis. State estate taxes are deductible, with limitations, in computing the federal taxable estate. Bequests to charities reduce the taxable estate.

Gift tax applies to all irrevocable transfers of interests in tangible or intangible property. Estate tax applies to all property owned in whole or in part by a citizen or resident at the time of his or her death, to the extent of the interest in the property. Generally, all types of property are subject to estate tax. Whether a decedent has sufficient interest in property for the property to be subject to gift or estate tax is determined under applicable state property laws. Certain interests in property that lapse at death (such as life insurance) are included in the taxable estate.

Taxable values of estates and gifts are the fair market value. For some assets, such as widely traded stocks and bonds, the value may be determined by market listings. The value of other property may be determined by appraisals, which are subject to potential contest by the taxing authority. Special use valuation applies to farms and closely held businesses, subject to limited dollar amount and other conditions. Monetary assets, such as cash, mortgages, and notes, are valued at the face amount, unless another value is clearly established.

Life insurance proceeds are included in the gross estate. The value of a right of a beneficiary of an estate to receive an annuity is included in the gross estate. Certain transfers during lifetime may be included in the gross estate. Certain powers of a decedent to control the disposition of property by another are included in the gross estate.

The taxable estate of a married decedent is reduced by a deduction for all property passing to the decedent's spouse. Certain terminable interests are included. Other conditions may apply.

Donors of gifts in excess of the annual exclusion must file gift tax returns on IRS Form 709 and pay the tax. Executors of estates with a gross value in excess of the unified credit must file an estate tax return on IRS Form 706 and pay the tax from the estate. Returns are required if the gifts or gross estate exceed the exclusions. Each state has its own forms and filing requirements. Tax authorities may examine and adjust gift and estate tax returns.

== Licenses and occupational taxes ==
Many jurisdictions within the United States impose taxes or fees on the privilege of carrying on a particular business or maintaining a particular professional certification. These licensing or occupational taxes may be a fixed dollar amount per year for the licensee, an amount based on the number of practitioners in the firm, a percentage of revenue, or any of several other bases. Persons providing professional or personal services are often subject to such fees. Common examples include accountants, attorneys, barbers, casinos, dentists, doctors, auto mechanics, plumbers, and stockbrokers. In addition to the tax, other requirements may be imposed for licensure.

All 50 states impose a vehicle license fee. Generally, the fees are based on the type and size of the vehicle and are imposed annually or biannually. All states and the District of Columbia also impose a fee for a driver's license, which generally must be renewed with payment of fee every few years.

=== User fees ===
Fees are often imposed by governments for use of certain facilities or services. Such fees are generally imposed at the time of use. Multi-use permits may be available. For example, fees are imposed for use of national or state parks, for requesting and obtaining certain rulings from the U.S. Internal Revenue Service (IRS), for the use of certain highways (called "tolls" or toll roads), for parking on public streets, and for the use of public transit.

== Tax administration ==
The total tax revenue as a percentage of GDP for the U.S. over the past several decades compared to other highly developed states

Taxes in the United States are administered by hundreds of tax authorities. At the federal level there are three tax administrations. Most domestic federal taxes are administered by the Internal Revenue Service, which is part of the Department of the Treasury. Alcohol, tobacco, and firearms taxes are administered by the Alcohol and Tobacco Tax and Trade Bureau (TTB). Taxes on imports (customs duties) are administered by U.S. Customs and Border Protection (CBP). TTB is also part of the Department of the Treasury and CBP belongs to the Department of Homeland Security.

Organization of state and local tax administrations varies widely. Every state maintains a tax administration. A few states administer some local taxes in whole or part. Most localities also maintain a tax administration or share one with neighboring localities.

=== Federal ===
==== Internal Revenue Service ====
The Internal Revenue Service (IRS) administers all U.S. federal tax laws on domestic activities, except those taxes administered by TTB. IRS functions include:

- Processing federal tax returns (except TTB returns), including those for Social Security and other federal payroll taxes
- Providing assistance to taxpayers in completing tax returns
- Collecting all taxes due related to such returns
- Enforcement of tax laws through examination of returns and assessment of penalties
- Providing an appeals mechanism for federal tax disputes
- Referring matters to the Justice Department for prosecution
- Publishing information about U.S. federal taxes, including forms, publications, and other materials
- Providing written guidance in the form of rulings binding on the IRS for the public and for particular taxpayers

The IRS maintains several Service Centers at which tax returns are processed. Taxpayers generally file most types of tax returns by mail with these Service Centers, or file electronically. The IRS also maintains a National Office in Washington, DC, and numerous local offices providing taxpayer services and administering tax examinations.

===== Examination =====
Tax returns filed with the IRS are subject to examination and adjustment, commonly called an IRS audit. Only a small percentage of returns (about 1% of individual returns in IRS FY 2008) are examined each year. The selection of returns uses a variety of methods based on IRS experiences. On examination, the IRS may request additional information from the taxpayer by mail, in person at IRS local offices, or at the business location of the taxpayer. The taxpayer is entitled to representation by an attorney, Certified Public Accountant (CPA), or enrolled agent, at the expense of the taxpayer, who may make representations to the IRS on behalf of the taxpayer.

Taxpayers have certain rights in an audit. Upon conclusion of the audit, the IRS may accept the tax return as filed or propose adjustments to the return. The IRS may also assess penalties and interest. Generally, adjustments must be proposed within three years of the due date of the tax return. Certain circumstances extend this time limit, including substantial understatement of income and fraud. The taxpayer and the IRS may agree to allow the IRS additional time to conclude an audit. If the IRS proposes adjustments, the taxpayer may agree to the adjustment, appeal within the IRS, or seek judicial determination of the tax.

===== Published and private rulings =====
In addition to enforcing tax laws, the IRS provides formal and informal guidance to taxpayers. While often referred to as IRS Regulations, the regulations under the Internal Revenue Code are issued by the Department of Treasury. IRS guidance consists of:

- Revenue Rulings, Revenue Procedures, and various IRS pronouncements applicable to all taxpayers and published in the Internal Revenue Bulletin, which are binding on the IRS
- Private letter rulings on specific issues, applicable only to the taxpayer who applied for the ruling
- IRS Publications providing informal instruction to the public on tax matters
- IRS forms and instructions
- A comprehensive web site
- Informal (nonbinding) advice by telephone

==== Alcohol and Tobacco Tax and Trade Bureau ====
The Alcohol and Tobacco Tax Trade Bureau (TTB), a division of the Department of the Treasury, enforces federal excise tax laws related to alcohol, tobacco, and firearms. TTB has six divisions, each with discrete functions:

- Revenue Center: processes tax returns and issues permits, and related activities
- Risk Management: internally develops guidelines and monitors programs
- Tax Audit: verifies filing and payment of taxes
- Trade Investigations: investigating arm for non-tobacco items
- Tobacco Enforcement Division: enforcement actions for tobacco
- Advertising, Labeling, and Formulation Division: implements various labeling and ingredient monitoring

Criminal enforcement related to TTB is done by the Bureau of Alcohol, Tobacco, Firearms, and Explosives, a division of the Justice Department.

==== Customs and Border Protection ====
U.S. Customs and Border Protection (CBP), an agency of the United States Department of Homeland Security, collects customs duties and regulates international trade. It has a workforce of over 58,000 employees covering over 300 official ports of entry to the United States. CBP has authority to seize and dispose of cargo in the case of certain violations of customs rules.

=== State administrations ===
Every state in the United States has its own tax administration, subject to the rules of that state's law and regulations. For example, the California Franchise Tax Board. These are referred to in most states as the Department of Revenue or Department of Taxation. The powers of the state taxing authorities vary widely. Most enforce all state level taxes but not most local taxes. However, many states have unified state-level sales tax administration, including for local sales taxes.

State tax returns are filed separately with those tax administrations, not with the federal tax administrations. Each state has its own procedural rules, which vary widely.

=== Local administrations ===
Most localities within the United States administer most of their own taxes. In many cases, there are multiple local taxing jurisdictions with respect to a particular taxpayer or property. For property taxes, the taxing jurisdiction is typically represented by a tax assessor/collector whose offices are located at the taxing jurisdiction's facilities.

== Legal basis ==
The United States Constitution provides that Congress "shall have the power to lay and collect Taxes, Duties, Imposts, and Excises ... but all Duties, Imposts, and Excises shall be uniform throughout the United States." Prior to amendment, it provided that "No Capitation, or other direct, Tax shall be Laid unless in proportion to the Census ..." The Sixteenth Amendment provided that "Congress shall have the power to lay and collect taxes on incomes, from whatever source derived, without apportionment among the several States, and without regard to any census or enumeration." The Tenth Amendment provided that "powers not delegated to the United States by this Constitution, nor prohibited to the States, are reserved to the States respectively, or to the people."

Congress has enacted numerous laws dealing with taxes since adoption of the Constitution. Those laws are now codified as Title 19, Customs Duties, Title 26, Internal Revenue Code, and various other provisions. These laws specifically authorize the United States Secretary of the Treasury to delegate various powers related to levy, assessment and collection of taxes.

State constitutions uniformly grant the state government the right to levy and collect taxes. Limitations under state constitutions vary widely.

Various fringe individuals and groups have questioned the legitimacy of United States federal income tax. These arguments are varied, but have been uniformly rejected by the Internal Revenue Service and by the courts and ruled to be frivolous.

== Policy issues ==
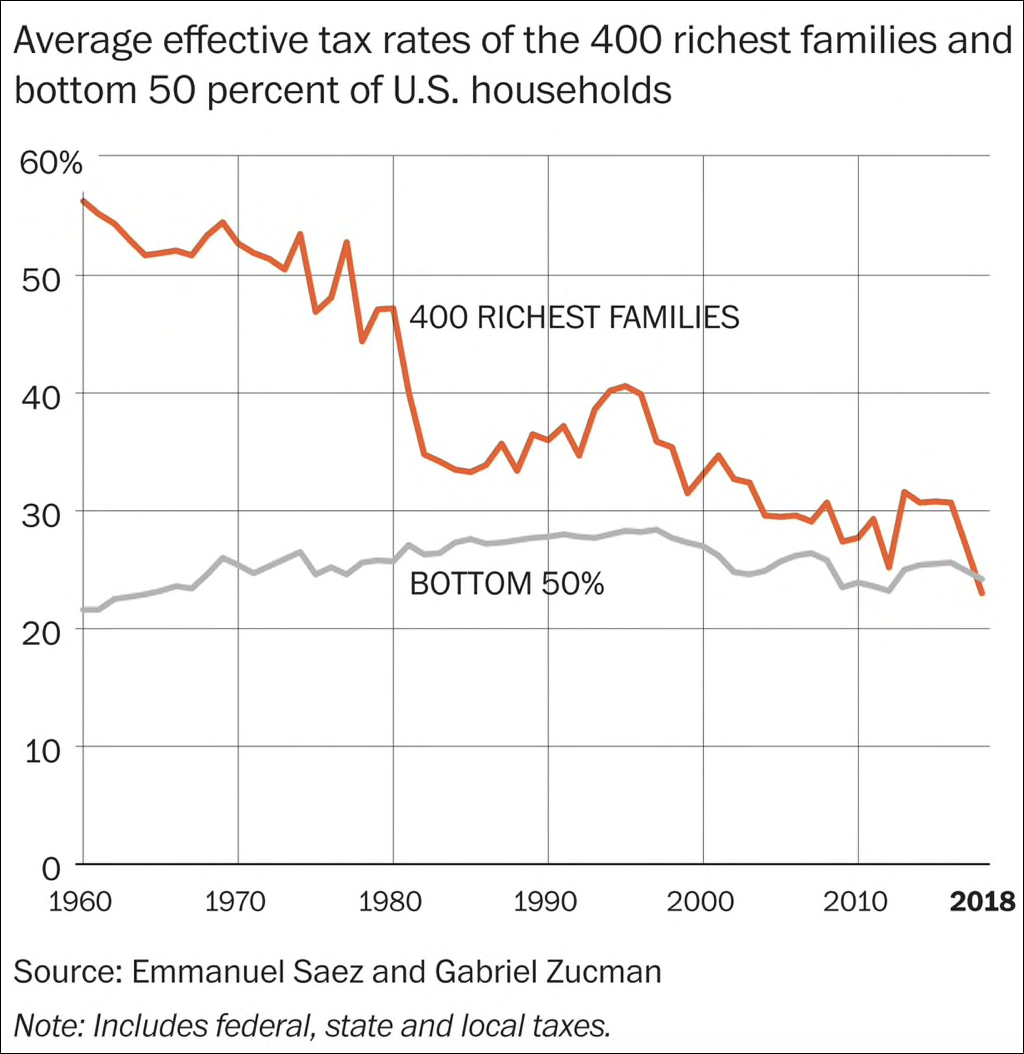
Average effective tax rates of 400 richest families and bottom 50% of US households. 1960–2018. Includes federal, state, and local taxes. Data sources: Emmanual Saez and Gabriel Zucman.

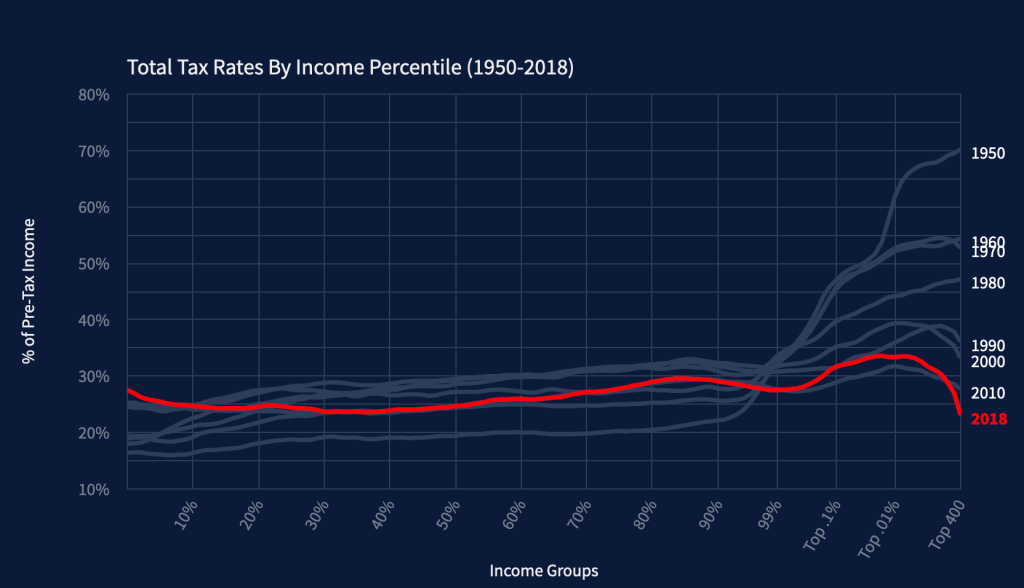
Total tax rates by income percentile in the United States, 1950–2018

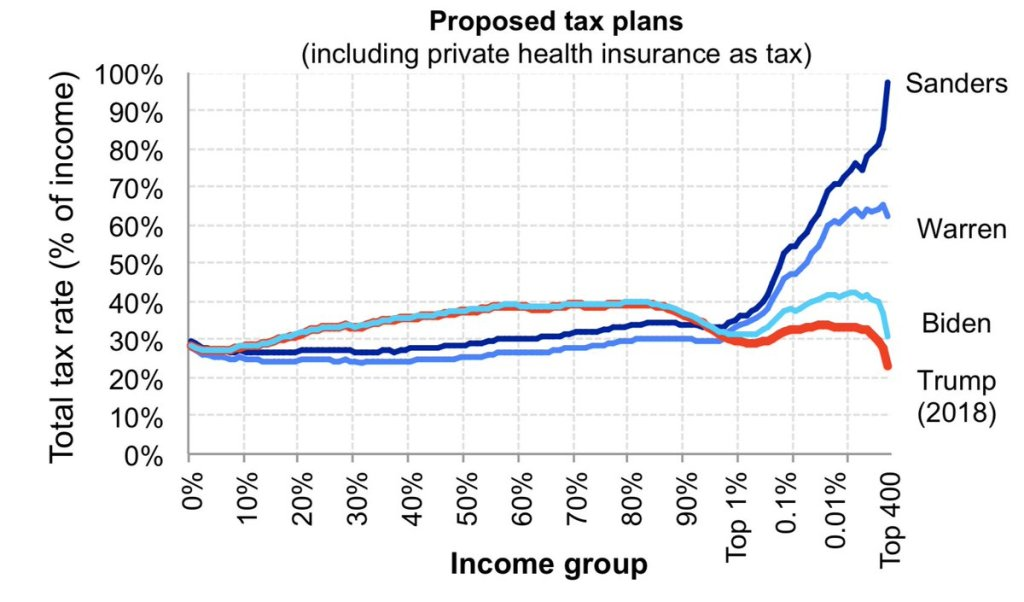
Proposed tax plan payment rates by income group as a percentage of income, including mandatory health insurance, of four 2020 United States presidential election candidates

Commentators Benjamin Page, Larry Bartels, and Jason Seawright contend that Federal tax policy in relation to regulation and reform in the United States tends to favor wealthy Americans. They assert that political influence is a legal right the wealthy can exercise by contributing funds to lobby for their policy preference.

Each major type of tax in the United States has been used by some jurisdiction at some time as a tool of social policy. Both liberals and conservatives have called for more progressive taxes in the U.S. Page, Bartels, and Seawright assert that, although members of the government favor a move toward progressive taxes, due to budget deficits, upper class citizens are not yet willing to make a push for the change. Tax cuts were provided during the Bush administration, and were extended in 2010, making federal income taxes less progressive.

=== Tax evasion ===
U.S. Treasury Department 2019 estimates of unpaid taxes indicate that over half of all unpaid taxes are attributable to the top 5% of earners.

The Internal Revenue Service estimated that, in 2001, the tax gap was $345 billion. The tax gap is the difference between the amount of tax legally owed and the amount actually collected by the government. The tax gap in 2006 was estimated to be $450 billion. The tax gap two years later in 2008 was estimated to be in the range of $450–$500 billion and unreported income was estimated to be approximately $2 trillion. Therefore, 18–19 percent of total reportable income was not properly reported to the IRS.

== Penalties ==
The IRS considers different reasons to penalize, missing tax deadlines or making errors on your return can lead to penalties from the IRS. These penalties apply to situations like failing to file on time, not paying what you owe, or including inaccurate information. The IRS may also charge interest on unpaid penalties, and some penalties accrue monthly until the full amount is settled. To avoid these consequences, it's important to understand the different types of penalties, how to address them if you receive one, and most importantly, how to file your taxes accurately and on time. The IRS will inform the recipient when the penalty will be assessed by means of a notice or a letter in the mail. These documents will detail the penalty, the reason for the penalty and what steps to take next. Likewise, the detailed information must be corroborated, since if the user can resolve the problem as soon as possible, the fine will not be imposed. The IRS applies certain interest on the penalties that have been incurred. However, the date from which interest begins to be charged may vary depending on the type of penalty that has been imposed. This interest accrues on the amount owed until the entire balance is paid. On the other hand, it is important to consider that interest can significantly increase the total amount owed, so the user should take care of his tax obligations as soon as possible and in an efficient manner so that he can avoid any additional charges. It is important to be aware that the IRS allows the penalized person to contest their penalty if they believe that the amount imposed is inadequate.

=== Interest Rates ===
The interest charged by the IRS is due to individuals or companies that do not pay their taxes or amounts due on time and does not cover the amount incurred, even if a request for extension of time has been filed. Likewise, interest may be generated in case the amount that has been paid exceeds the corresponding value. The IRS has established the tax rules and regulations in a very clear manner so that users comply with their tax obligations properly.

=== Quarterly interest rates ===
By 2024 the quarterly interest rates are divided depending on the category to which they are assigned. Among the categories considered by the IRS, the interest imposed on overpayment not made by a business, i.e. a private individual, is 8%. On the other hand, the overpayment made by a business is 7%. The underpayment, whether by a company or a private individual, is 8%. The interest imposed on GATT (part of an overpayment by a company more than EUR 10,000) is 5.5%. For large companies with underpayments, the interest charged is 10%. Finally, the interest charged on deposit 6603 of the Internal Revenue Code (IRC) (federal short-term rate) is 5%.

=== Types of penalties ===
==== Information return penalty ====
This penalty is applied when the information or tax returns are not filed on time or correctly, i.e., in case there are inconsistencies in the information this penalty will be applied to the user. In this case, charges may apply, as established in 2024, depending on the period in which the user responds after having been notified. The penalty may range from US$60, in case the response is made 30 days later, to US$630 for willful disregard.

==== Failure to File Penalty ====
This penalty is imposed on the individual who does not file the income tax return on the due date. In this case the fine is equivalent to 5% of the taxes that have not been paid each month, however, the ceiling is up to 25%. On the other hand, in case the penalty for not filing the return and the penalty for not paying the respective taxes are combined in the same month, the penalty for not filing is reduced by the amount of the penalty for not paying, resulting in a combined penalty of 5% for each month or part of the month that the return is late. After 5 months of non-payment of any amount, the non-filing penalty is reduced in full, however, the non-payment penalty is capped at 25%. Finally, in case the return has been filed more than 60 days late the charges can reach up to US$485 after December 12, 2023.

==== Failure to pay penalty ====
This penalty is applied to the customer who has not paid his taxes before their due date. In this case the penalty is fixed with a percentage based on the amount of taxes that have not been paid. As previously mentioned, this penalty will not exceed 25%.

==== Accuracy-related penalty ====
This penalty is applied when the person pays less than what is stated on his or her tax return. The reasons why people fail to pay the corresponding amount may be because they have not reported the actual or full amount of their income, on the other hand, it may happen that the person has applied for some type of extension or credit for which he/she does not qualify. Within this penalty the IRS can proceed in two ways. It can apply a Negligence or disregard of the rules or regulations penalty, which is due to the lack of attention and the correct following of the U.S. tax laws to complete the tax return. It is considered that the person may recklessly or intentionally disregard the established rules or regulations. On the other hand, there may also be the case where a Substantial understatement of income tax penalty applies, which applies when the person understates his tax liability by 10% of the tax shown on his return or equals US$5,000. However, if the person has qualified for a business deduction, the percentage is 5% or US$5,000.

==== Erroneous claim for refund or credit ====
This penalty applies when the person has filed a claim for a refund or return of income tax for an excessive amount and no reasonable cause applies for such claim. The penalty is equal to 20% of the excessive amount that has been claimed.

==== Failure to Deposit Penalty ====
This penalty is applied when the individual has not paid the appropriate employment taxes on time and in the proper amount. These employment taxes include taxes on the individual's income, social security and health care, and federal unemployment. The percentage of the penalty depends on how many days the payment is overdue from the due date. From 1 to 5 days is equivalent to a penalty of 2% of the amount that has not been paid, however, if the delay exceeds 15 days the percentage can increase up to 10%.

==== Tax preparer penalties ====
The tax return preparers who engage in misconduct are hereby penalized, i.e., there may be a possibility that an agent certified to prepare a third party's tax returns may fail to comply with the established tax regulations. Charges will be made based on the number of violations, the type of regulations violated, inflation rates, and the number of tax years on record.

==== Dishonored Check or Other Form of Payment Penalty ====
This penalty will simply be alleviated when the person's bank provider does not accept the user's check or other form of payment. This may be because there is insufficient money in the bank account to cover the amount of tax owed. In this case the amount of the penalty is US$25 when the amount owed is less than US$1,250. In case the debt exceeds this amount, the penalty is 2% of the amount owed.

==== Underpayment of Estimated Tax by Corporations Penalty ====
This type of penalty is intended for corporations that have not made sufficient payments based on estimated tax or simply have not paid in a timely manner. Generally, corporations make these payments on a quarterly basis when they expect to pay over US$500 on their tax return. The amount of the penalty will depend on the amount of the underpayment, the period overdue for payment and the quarterly interest rate mentioned above.

==== Underpayment of Estimated Tax by Individuals Penalty ====
Like the previous one, the difference is that this penalty is applied to individuals, estates, or trusts. The calculation of the amount is made under the same conditions as the penalty to a corporation.

==== International information reporting penalties ====
This penalty is applied when the tax filer has its financial activity established abroad and does not comply with U.S. tax rules and regulations. In this case monthly interest is charged until the debtor pays the taxes based on the tax regulations where he files his taxes, in this case U.S.

== United States as a tax haven ==
Although the United States as a whole is not generally viewed as a tax haven, among its 50 states there are some that individuals and companies use to store their wealth and avoid or evade taxes. This fact was mostly revealed in the leaked Pandora papers – 11.9 million documents that, beginning from October 31, 2021, exposed offshore accounts of world leaders and celebrities. In total the United States were revealed to shelter the second largest amount of money in the world.

=== South Dakota ===
Between the years 2011 and 2021 the assets managed in South Dakota by trust companies went from $75 billion to $367 billion. The assets are coming from all over the world – The South Dakota Trust Company has clients from 54 nations. Trusts are particularly popular in South Dakota because, in 1983, it revoked a law that prevented hereditary estates, allowing for the creation of trusts (serving to pass property onto one's children) that, while preventing the sale of the estate assets, also shield those assets from tax. Unlike in the precedent for this in the English common law where these trusts could only exist for 21 years, South Dakota enables trusts to exist indefinitely. Trusts in South Dakota also serve as shields from government inspections and can even protect an individual if they get divorced or file a bankruptcy. In addition to this South Dakota is also one of nine states in the United States with no income tax.

=== Delaware ===
The state of Delaware is home to nearly 68% of the Fortune 500 companies. Corporation trust center in the city of Wilmington is the address to over 285,000 companies including Delaware entities of Google, Amazon, General Motors, Deutsche Bank's subsidiaries etc. This is because this state does not collect any local and state sales tax and the companies based there are not subject to any income tax on their intangible assets. Legally this tax haven can be used by holding companies that charge their subsidiaries trademark charges – thus moving their income (in accounting terms reducing their income tax base by expenses) to the company set up in Delaware where it is not subject to state taxes. Property such as a trademark is hard to put an exact number on which offers the companies a lot of leeway on how much money they move to Delaware. If companies do not conduct any business in Delaware, then they pay a lower franchise tax instead of the corporate income tax. Also because of its business-friendly usury laws the interest rates can go above the average there and therefore Delaware attracts financial companies. Delaware also offers benefits in terms of high secrecy levels (companies do not have to file their beneficiaries nor their officers and directors) and predictable judiciary rulings in conflicts between companies.

=== Nevada ===
The state of Nevada has no state income tax, no personal income tax, no inheritance tax, and no franchise tax. This makes it a very widely used tax haven alongside of South Dakota and Delaware. Nevada also does not have an agreement with the IRS on sharing information, so some entities choose to incorporate here as to enjoy the benefits of high privacy. In addition, there are other laws on privacy and company officers' liability that make Nevada business friendly.

== Economics ==
According to a 2011 study by Arthur Laffer and others, the U.S. economy would become approximately $1.6 trillion larger or $5,200 wealthier per person, after a simplification of the complex U.S. tax system.

== History ==
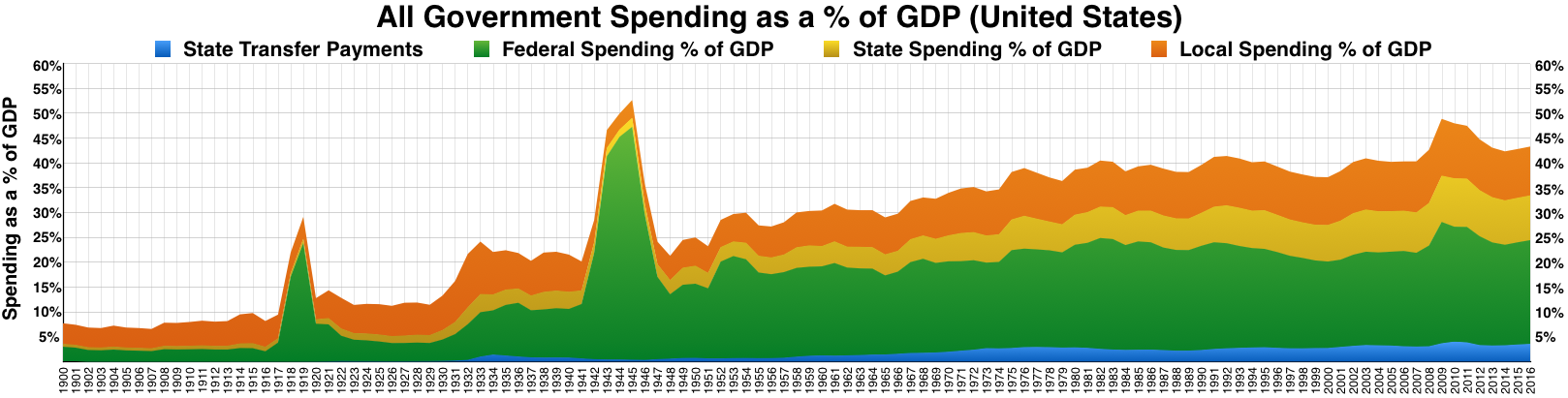
Total government spending on all levels (United States)

Before 1776, the American Colonies were subject to taxation by Great Britain and also imposed local taxes. Property taxes were imposed in the Colonies as early as 1634. In 1673, the English Parliament imposed a tax on exports from the American Colonies, and with it created the first tax administration in what would become the United States. Other tariffs and taxes were imposed by Parliament. Most of the colonies and many localities adopted property taxes.

Under Article VIII of the Articles of Confederation, the United States government did not have the power to tax. All such power lay with the states. The United States Constitution, adopted in 1787, authorized the federal government to lay and collect taxes, but required that some types of tax revenues be given to the states in proportion to population. Tariffs were the principal federal tax through the 1800s.

By 1796, state and local governments in fourteen of the 15 states taxed land. Delaware taxed the income from property. The War of 1812 required a federal sales tax on specific luxury items due to its costs. However, internal taxes were dropped in 1817 in favor of import tariffs that went to the federal government. By the American Civil War, the principle of taxation of property at a uniform rate had developed, and many of the states relied on property taxes as a major source of revenue. However, the increasing importance of intangible property, such as corporate stock, caused the states to shift to other forms of taxation in the 1900s.

Income taxes in the form of "faculty" taxes were imposed by the colonies. These combined income and property tax characteristics, and the income element persisted after 1776 in a few states. Several states adopted income taxes in 1837. Wisconsin adopted a corporate and individual income tax in 1911, and was the first to administer the tax with a state tax administration.

The first federal income tax was adopted as part of the Revenue Act of 1861. The tax lapsed after the American Civil War. Subsequently enacted income taxes were held to be unconstitutional by the Supreme Court in Pollock v. Farmers' Loan & Trust Co. because they did not apportion taxes on property by state population. In 1913, the Sixteenth Amendment to the United States Constitution was ratified, permitting the federal government to levy an income tax on both property and labor.

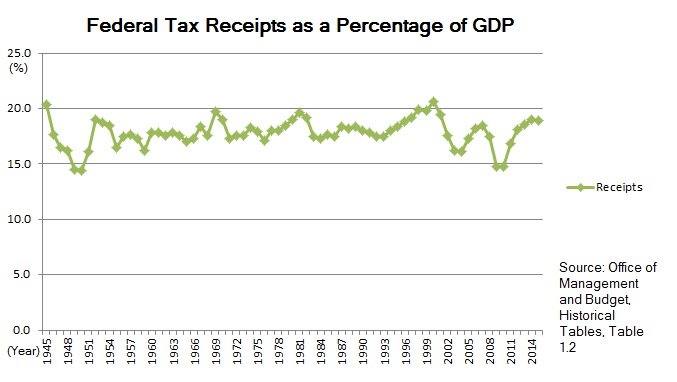
U.S. federal government tax receipts as a percentage of GDP from 1945 to 2015. 2010 to 2015 data are estimated.

The federal income tax enacted in 1913 included corporate and individual income taxes. It defined income using language from prior laws, incorporated in the Sixteenth Amendment, as "all income from whatever source derived". The tax allowed deductions for business expenses, but few non-business deductions. In 1918 the income tax law was expanded to include a foreign tax credit and more comprehensive definitions of income and deduction items. Various aspects of the present system of definitions were expanded through 1926, when U.S. law was organized as the United States Code. Income, estate, gift, and excise tax provisions, plus provisions relating to tax returns and enforcement, were codified as Title 26, also known as the Internal Revenue Code. This was reorganized and somewhat expanded in 1954, and remains in the same general form.

Federal taxes were expanded greatly during World War I. In 1921, Treasury Secretary Andrew Mellon engineered a series of significant income tax cuts under three presidents. Mellon argued that tax cuts would spur growth. Taxes were raised again in the latter part of the Great Depression, and during World War II. Income tax rates were reduced significantly during the Johnson, Nixon, and Reagan presidencies. Significant tax cuts for corporations and all individuals were enacted during the second Bush presidency.

During 1936 the United States adopted the British system of deduction-at-source. This was extended to include dividends, interest, rent, wages and salaries paid by corporations. This system was short-lived as it was soon to be replaced by the system of information-at-source. As was found in Britain this proved to be one of the worst systems as it imposed a huge burden on revenue authorities to correlate large quantities of information. As had Britain, the United States returned to the deduction-at-source system thirty years after it was abolished.

In 1986, Congress adopted, with little modification, a major expansion of the income tax portion of the IRS Code proposed in 1985 by the U.S. Treasury Department under President Reagan. The thousand-page Tax Reform Act of 1986 significantly lowered tax rates, adopted sweeping expansions of international rules, eliminated the lower individual tax rate for capital gains, added significant inventory accounting rules, and made substantial other expansions of the law.

Federal income tax rates have been modified frequently. Tax rates were changed in 34 of the 97 years between 1913 and 2010. The rate structure has been graduated since the 1913 act.

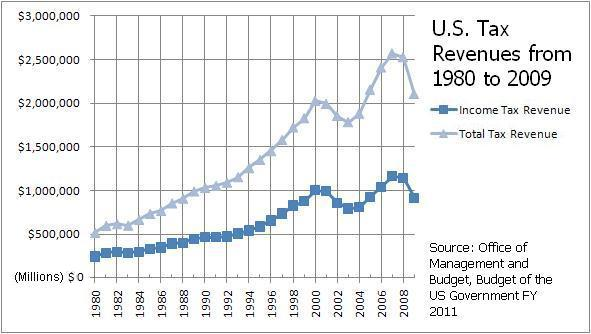
Total tax revenue (not adjusted for inflation) for the U.S. federal government from 1980 to 2009 compared to the amount of revenue coming from individual income taxes

The first individual income tax return Form 1040 under the 1913 law was four pages long. In 1915, some Congressmen complained about the complexity of the form. In 1921, Congress considered but did not enact replacement of the income tax with a national sales tax.

By the 1920s, many states had adopted income taxes on individuals and corporations. Many of the state taxes were simply based on the federal definitions. The states generally taxed residents on all of their income, including income earned in other states, as well as income of nonresidents earned in the state. This led to a long line of Supreme Court cases limiting the ability of states to tax income of nonresidents.

The states had also come to rely heavily on retail sales taxes. However, as of the beginning of World War II, only two cities (New York and New Orleans) had local sales taxes.

The Federal Estate Tax was introduced in 1916, and Gift Tax in 1924. Unlike many inheritance taxes, the Gift and Estate taxes were imposed on the transferor rather than the recipient. Many states adopted either inheritance taxes or estate and gift taxes, often computed as the amount allowed as a deduction for federal purposes. These taxes remained under 1% of government revenues through the 1990s.

All governments within the United States provide tax exemption for some income, property, or persons. These exemptions have their roots both in tax theory, federal and state legislative history, and the United States Constitution.

== See also ==
- History of taxation in the United States
- Internal Revenue Service
- List of countries by tax rates
- List of countries by tax revenue as percentage of GDP
- Tariffs in United States history
- Tax Cuts and Jobs Act of 2017
- Tax resistance in the United States
- Stepped-up basis
