= Form W-2 =

IRS tax form

Form W-2, 2016

Form W-2, officially titled the "Wage and Tax Statement", is an Internal Revenue Service (IRS) tax form used in the United States to report wages paid to employees and the federal taxes withheld from their pay. Employers are required to complete a Form W-2 for each employee who receives salary, wages, or other compensation in the context of an employment relationship.

Form W-2 must be provided to employees by January 31 of the year following the tax year reported, giving individuals sufficient time to prepare their income tax returns before the standard April 15 deadline. The form is also used to report FICA taxes to the Social Security Administration (SSA). Employers are generally required to file Form W-2, along with Form W-3, with the SSA by the end of February.

The SSA transmits relevant Form W-2 data to the Internal Revenue Service for tax compliance purposes. In U.S. territories, the form includes a two-letter territory code, such as W-2GU for Guam. If corrections are needed, employers may file Form W-2c.

The use of the form has led to the phrase "W-2 employees" to refer to those who receive Form W-2, in contrast to independent contractors and other "1099 workers" whose income is instead reported on Form 1099.

== Significance for employee's tax return ==
Form W-2 includes wage and salary information as well as federal, state, and other taxes that were withheld. This information is used by the employee when they complete their individual tax return using Form 1040.

When an employee prepares their individual tax return for a tax year, the withholding amount from Form W-2 is subtracted from the tax due. It is possible to receive a refund from the IRS if more income was withheld than necessary.

Since the IRS receives a copy of the W-2 from the employer, if the amount reported on the W-2 does not match the amount reported on Form 1040, the IRS will note the discrepancy and may reject the form. In addition, if an individual does not pay the required amount of taxes, the IRS will also know this. In this way, the IRS uses Form W-2 as a way to track an employee's tax liability, and the form has come to be seen as a formal proof of income. The Social Security Administration, court proceedings, and applications for federal financial aid for college all use Form W-2 as proof of income.

The employee receives three paper copies of Form W-2: one as a personal record, one for the federal tax return filing, and one for the state tax return filing. Form W-2 must be attached to one's individual tax return; this is to substantiate claims of withholding.

Employees are required to report their wage, salary, and tip income even if they don't receive a Form W-2 for this income.

=== Tip income ===
Employees are required to report their tip income to their employers (usually using Form 4070). Tips are subject to income withholding. There are various other requirements when handling tips for tax purposes.

== Filing requirements ==
Form W-2 must be completed by the employers and be in the mail to be sent to employees by January 31. The deadline for filing electronic or paper W-2 Forms to the Social Security Administration (SSA) is also January 31.

If over 250 instances of Form W-2 are being filed for the year, electronic filing is required.

The form consists of six copies:

- Copy A – Submitted by the employer to the Social Security Administration. (In addition, the employer must also submit Form W-3, which is a summary of all Forms W-2 completed, along with all Copies A submitted. The Form W-3 must be signed by the employer.)
- Copy B – To be sent to the employee and filed by the employee with the employee's federal income tax returns.
- Copy C – To be sent to the employee, to be retained by the employee for the employee's records.
- Copy D – To be retained by the employer, for the employer's records.
- Copy 1 – To be filed with the employer's state or local income tax returns (if any).
- Copy 2 – To be filed with the employee's state or local income tax returns (if any).

Employers are instructed to send copies B, C, 1, and 2 to their employees generally by January 31 of the year immediately following the year of income to which the Form W-2 relates, which gives these taxpayers about 2 1/2 months before the April 15 income tax due date. The Form W-2, with Form W-3, generally must be filed by the employer with the Social Security Administration by the end of February.

=== Filing modalities ===
Traditionally Form W-2 has been completed by paper. Tax compliance software such as TurboTax allow the form to be completed electronically. For paper filing, Form W-2 can be ordered from the IRS website.

When filing by paper, Copy A of the form cannot be printed from the IRS website. In other words, the official form ordered from the IRS must be used.

== Penalties ==
Late filings within 30 days of the due date incur a penalty of $30 per form. After 30 days but before August 1, the penalty increases to $60 per form (capped between $200–500 depending on the size of the business). After August 1, the penalty increases to $100 per form (capped between $500–1,500 depending on the size of the business).

The penalty for a single incorrect Form W-2 is $250 per receiving party (capped annually at $3 million); this means a single incorrect Form W-2 to both the employer and the IRS incurs a penalty of $500. The penalty for intentionally failing to file is $500.

Further penalties exist for illegible forms and for filing by paper even past the 250 form limit.

== History ==
Use of Form W-2 was established by the Current Tax Payment Act of 1943 as part of an effort to withhold income at source. The first Form W-2s were issued to employees in 1944.

In 1965, the form's name was changed from "Withholding Tax Statement" to "Wage and Tax Statement" (current name).

In 1978, the form's appearance changed to its modern style of numbered boxes.

As with the US tax code and other forms (such as the 1040), Form W-2 has become more complicated over time.

The penalty for incorrect forms was increased in 2015.

== Phishing scheme involving W-2s ==
In March 2016, the IRS issued an alert concerning a new type of phishing email attack which attempts to lure human resources, accounting, or payroll staff into disclosing the W-2 information of all employees within a company, presumably intended for use in tax-related identity theft, which the IRS defines as "...when someone uses your stolen Social Security number to file a tax return claiming a fraudulent refund." This may give a cybercriminal enough information to fraudulently file a tax return on the victim's behalf and direct the tax refund to the cybercriminal's bank account. This phishing scheme is particularly characterized by its use of spear-phishing (emails sent to specific individuals) and email spoofing to pose as a company executive requesting the W-2 information, thereby increasing the urgency of the response and catching payroll staff off-guard:

- "Can you send me the updated list of employees with full details (Name, Social Security Number, Date of Birth, Home Address, Salary)."
- "Kindly send me the individual 2015 W-2 (PDF) and earnings summary of all W-2 of our company staff for a quick review."
- "I want you to send me the list of W-2 copies of employees' wage and tax statements for 2015, I need them in PDF file type, you can send it as an attachment. Kindly prepare the lists and email them to me asap."

Large companies such as Snap Inc., Mansueto Ventures, and Seagate fell victim to this phishing scheme in early March 2016.

Those in the cybersecurity industry categorize this phishing scheme as a type of CEO Fraud, while the FBI's Criminal, Cyber, and International Operations Divisions classify it as a type of "business email compromise" or BEC.

== Analogs in other countries ==
Country	Form name
Canada	T4
Israel	106 form
Russia	2-NDFL
Poland	PIT-11
UK	P60
India	Form 16
South Africa	IRP5/IT3(a)
Philippines	BIR Form 2316

== See also ==
- Form 1040
- Form W-9
- Form W-4
- Form 1099
- Independent contractor-employee distinction in the United States
- Tax withholding in the United States
