= Beardsley Ruml =

American economist

- Born: November 5, 1894; Cedar Rapids, Iowa
- Died: April 19, 1960 (aged 65); Danbury, Connecticut
- Education: Dartmouth College, 1915 B.A. University of Chicago, 1917 Ph.D.
- Spouse(s): Lois Treadwell, married on August 28, 1917
- Children: 3
- Parent(s): Salome Beardsley Ruml and Wentzle Ruml

Beardsley Ruml (5 November 1894 – 19 April 1960) was an American statistician, economist, philanthropist, planner, businessman and man of affairs in the 1920s, 1930s and 1940s.

He was born in Cedar Rapids, Iowa. His father, Wentzle Ruml, was a country doctor. His mother, Salome Beardsley Ruml, was a hospital superintendent.

Ruml received a BA from Dartmouth College in 1915 and a Ph.D. in psychology and education from the University of Chicago in 1917.

On August 28, 1917, he married Lois Treadwell; they had three children. A pioneer statistician, in 1918 he helped design aptitude and intelligence tests for the U.S. Army. Ruml viewed society as composed of groups whose traits could be measured and ranked on a scale of normality and deviance.

From 1922 to 1929, he directed the fellowship program of the Laura Spelman Rockefeller Memorial Fund, focusing on support for quantitative social and behavioral science. He was an advisor to President Herbert Hoover, especially on farm issues. In 1931, he became dean of the Division of Social Sciences at the University of Chicago—a center for quantitative research. He was not popular with the faculty and in 1934 Ruml quit to become an executive of Macy's, parent company of the department store. A faculty wife quipped that he was trading ideas for notions. He played a key role in organizing liberal leaders of the business community to support New Deal spending programs. Named a director of the Federal Reserve Bank of New York in 1937, he worked with academic economists in the development of Keynesian policies for the New Deal spending budget. He teamed with Harry Hopkins to convince President Roosevelt that increased federal spending in 1938 was the best remedy for the sharp Recession of 1937–1938. Deficit spending reached 5% of GNP. Ruml became chairman of Macy's in 1945. He also served as a director of the New York Federal Reserve Bank (1937–1947), and was its chairman from 1941 until 1946. He was active at the Bretton Woods Conference (1944), which established the international monetary system.

In 1942, Ruml proposed that the U.S. Treasury start collecting income taxes through a withholding, pay-as-you-go, system. He proposed an abatement on the previous year's taxes, making up the revenue by immediately collecting on the current year's taxes. In 1943 Congress adopted the employer withholding system.

In 1945, Ruml made a famous speech to the ABA, asserting that since the end of the gold standard, "Taxes for Revenue are Obsolete". The real purposes of taxes, he asserted, were: to "stabilize the purchasing power of the dollar," to "express public policy in the distribution of wealth and of income," "in subsidizing or in penalizing various industries and economic groups" and to "isolate and assess directly the costs of certain national benefits, such as highways and social security." This is seen as a forerunner of functional finance or neochartalism.

Ruml wrote several books and essays, including The Interest Rate Problem, Memo to a college trustee: A report on financial and structural problems of the liberal college, Government, Business, and Values, and Tomorrow's Business.

Ruml died April 19, 1960, in Danbury, Connecticut. He is buried at Umpawaug Cemetery, in Redding, Connecticut.

== References and further reading ==
- Patrick D. Reagan. Designing a New America: The Origins of New Deal Planning, 1890-1943 University of Massachusetts Press 2000.
- Patrick D. Reagan. The Withholding Tax, Beardsley Ruml, and Modern American Policy,. Prologue. 24 (1992): 19–31.
- Beardsley Ruml. “The Subject Matter of Criminology.” Columbia Law Review, vol. 34, no. 2, 1934, pp. 273–77. online
- Beardsley Ruml. " The pay-as-you-go income tax plan" The Bulletin of the National Tax Association, vol. 28, no. 6, 1943, pp. 166–71. online
- Beardsley Ruml. Government, Busine$s,-and Values (Harper, 1943).
- Beardsley. Ruml. “The Protection of Individual Enterprise.” Proceedings of the Academy of Political Science, vol. 21, no. 3, 1945, pp. 169–74. online
- Beardsley Ruml. Taxes for Revenue are Obsolete. American Affairs, Jan. 1946, VIII:1, p. 35 pdf
