= Disregarded entity =

Under U.S. tax law, a disregarded entity is an entity which is ignored for the purposes of taxation. Common examples of disregarded entities include single-member LLCs, qualified subchapter S subsidiaries and grantor trusts.

== Features ==
According to the IRS, single-member LLCs that do not elect to be taxed as a corporation are disregarded entities. If the owner is an individual, then the LLC's activities will be reflected on the owner's tax return. Single-member LLCs owned by a corporation or partnership have their activities reflected in the corporation's or partnership's tax return. In this case, the use of a disregarded entity offers taxpayers the benefits of limited liability without the drawback of double taxation.

In certain circumstances, corporations wholly owned by an S corporation (qualified subchapter S subsidiaries) are disregarded for tax purposes. Any taxable events within the subsidiary corporation will be reflected on the S corporation's tax return, and transactions between the subsidiary and the parent S corporation are ignored.

Grantor trusts are also generally disregarded for tax purposes.

Disregarded entities have significant advantages for mergers and acquisitions. Because of the "substance over form" judicial doctrine, exchanges of property between the corporate or individual owner of a disregarded entity are not taxable events.

== History ==
In 1954, Congress created the first type of disregarded entity, a grantor trust.

In 1996, the Treasury Department created new, simplified "check-the-box" rules for LLCs, which meant that single-member LLCs were disregarded for tax purposes (absent any elections). Previously, single-member LLCs were generally taxed as corporations under the Kintner test.

In 2017, the Treasury Department issued new regulations that require disregarded entities owned by a foreign person to file the informational return Form 5472.

== See also ==
- Look-through company
