= Backup withholding =

Sending of a portion of a payment to a tax authority

In tax administration in the United States, backup withholding is the sending of a portion of a payment (such as a wage) to a tax authority instead of to the payee. This applies to the Internal Revenue Service (IRS) and the tax authorities of some states. For the IRS, it applies to some payments reported on Form 1099 which must be submitted to the IRS by financial institutions and businesses making certain income payments. Factors that necessitate backup withholding include:

- Incorrect taxpayer identification number (TIN)/ITIN/ATIN on Form W-9
- An IRS backup withholding order
- Certain types of payments

== Withholding rules ==
When opening an account, making an investment, or receiving payments reportable on Form 1099, individuals or entities must provide their taxpayer identification number (TIN) to the respective institution. In turn, the institution issues a Form W-9, Request for Taxpayer Identification Number and Certification, or a similar form. The individual or entity must enter their TIN on the form. If the account or investment accrues interest or dividends, they must also certify that they are not subject to backup withholding due to prior under-reporting of interest and dividends.

The payer is required to withhold 24% of the payment in the following scenarios:

1. Failure to provide the TIN in the required manner.
2. IRS notification that the TIN is incorrect
3. IRS directive to withhold for under-reported interest or dividends (after four notices over at least 120 days)
4. Failure to certify exemption from backup withholding for under-reported interest and dividends.

Prevention and resolution

If a payer issues a "B" notice due to an incorrect TIN, individuals can usually prevent or stop backup withholding by submitting the correct name and TIN. Certification of TIN accuracy is essential. A second "B" notice requires verification from the Social Security Administration or IRS.

If notified of under-reported interest or dividends, individuals must request and receive a determination from the IRS to prevent or stop backup withholding.

Tax return treatment

If income tax has been withheld under backup withholding, individuals should claim credit for it on their tax return for the year in which the income was received.

For more details, see IRS Publication 1281 (Backup Withholding for Missing and Incorrect Name/TINs), which outlines payer procedures, and Publication 505 (Tax Withholding and Estimated Tax).

== State backup withholding ==
Some states may also require backup withholding if it is already required by the IRS:

- California: 7%
- Vermont: 7.56%
- Maine: 5%
