= Form W-9 =

United States income tax form

Form W-9, 2024

Form W-9 (officially, the "Request for Taxpayer Identification Number and Certification") is used in the United States income tax system by a third party who must file an information return with the Internal Revenue Service (IRS). It requests the name, address, and taxpayer identification information of a taxpayer (in the form of a Social Security Number or Employer Identification Number).

The form is never actually sent to the IRS; it is maintained by the individual who files the information return for verification purposes. The information on the Form W-9 and the payment made are reported on a Form 1099.

== Use cases ==
=== Business–contractor arrangement ===
Form W-9 is most commonly used in a business–contractor arrangement. Businesses can use Form W-9 to request information from contractors they hire. Payments to a contractor for services are reported on Form 1099-NEC. Nonemployee compensation was reported in box 7 of Form 1099-MISC through tax year 2019 and moved to Form 1099-NEC beginning with tax year 2020. The reporting threshold was $600 through the 2025 tax year. For tax years beginning after 2025 it increased to $2,000, and it may be adjusted for inflation beginning in calendar year 2027.

=== Avoiding backup withholding ===
Another purpose of Form W-9 is to help the payee avoid backup withholding. The payer must collect withholding taxes on certain reportable payments for the IRS. However, if the payee certifies on the W-9 they are not subject to backup withholding they generally receive the full payment due them from the payer. This is similar to the withholding exemption certifications found on Form W-4 for employees.

== Filing method ==
Form W-9 can be completed on paper or electronically. For electronic filing, there are several requirements. Namely, a requester who establishes an electronic filing system must ensure that the electronic system provides the same information as on a paper Form W-9, that a hard copy can be supplied to the IRS on demand, that "the information received is the information sent and […] all occasions of user access that result in the submission [are documented]", that the person accessing the system and providing the information is the individual identified on the form, and that an electronic signature is used.

== Deadline ==
Some certified public accountants consider it best practice to ensure the completion of Form W-9 by payees before issuing any payments.

There may also be a $50 penalty for each instance in which Form W-9 is not filled out.

== See also ==
- Foreign Account Tax Compliance Act
