= Tax withholding in the United States =

Three key types of withholding tax are imposed at various levels in the United States:

- Wage withholding taxes,
- Withholding tax on payments to foreign persons, and
- Backup withholding on dividends and interest.

The amount of tax withheld is based on the amount of payment subject to tax. Withholding of tax on wages includes income tax, social security and medicare, and a few taxes in some states. Certain minimum amounts of wage income are not subject to income tax withholding. Wage withholding is based on wages actually paid and employee declarations on federal and state Forms W-4. Social Security tax withholding terminates when payments from one employer exceed the maximum wage base during the year.

Amounts withheld by payers (employers or others) must be remitted to the relevant government promptly. Amounts subject to withholding and taxes withheld are reported to payees and the government annually.

== History ==
During World War II, Congress introduced payroll withholding and quarterly tax payments with the vote of the Current Tax Payment Act of 1943 :

In their History of the U.S. Tax System, the U.S. Department of Treasury describes tax withholding.

This greatly eased the collection of the tax for both the taxpayer and the Bureau of Internal Revenue. However, it also greatly reduced the taxpayer's awareness of the amount of tax being collected, i.e. it reduced the transparency of the tax, which made it easier to raise taxes in the future.

== Withholding on wages ==
In the US, withholding by employers of tax on wages is required by the federal, most state, and some local governments. Taxes withheld include federal income tax, Social Security and Medicare taxes, state income tax, and certain other levies by a few states.

Income tax withheld on wages is based on the amount of wages less an amount for declared withholding allowances (often called exemptions). Withholding for allowances are calculated based on the assumption of a full year of wages. Amounts of tax withheld are determined by the employer. Tax rates and withholding tables apply separately at the federal, most state, and some local levels. The amount to be withheld is based on both the amount wages paid on any paycheck and the period covered by the paycheck. Federal and some state withholding amounts are at graduated rates, so higher wages have higher withholding percentages. Withheld income taxes are treated by employees as a payment on account of tax due for the year, which is determined on the annual income tax return filed after the end of the year (federal Form 1040 series, and appropriate state forms). Withholdings in excess of tax so determined are refunded.

Under Internal Revenue Code section 3402(f)(2) and related U.S. Treasury regulations, an employee must provide the employer with a Federal Form W-4, "Employee's Withholding Allowance Certificate." Most states will accept the W4 form, but a few have a similar form, especially if the employee is filing different information at the state level than at the federal (an employee may be paying a different amount in withholding or claiming a different number of exemptions at the state level than the federal level). The form provides the employer with a Social Security number. Also, on the form employees declare the number of withholding allowances they believe they are entitled to. Allowances are generally based on the number of personal exemptions plus an amount for itemized deductions, losses, or credits. Employers are entitled to rely on employee declarations on Form W-4 unless they know they are wrong.

Social Security tax is withheld from wages at a flat rate of 6.2% (4.2% for 2011 and 2012). Wages paid above a fixed amount each year by any one employee are not subject to Social Security tax. For 2023, this wage maximum is $160,200. Medicare tax of 1.45% is withheld from wages, with no maximum. (This brings the total federal payroll tax withholding to 7.65%.) Employers are required to pay an additional equal amount of Medicare taxes, and a 6.2% rate of Social Security taxes.

Many states also impose additional taxes that are withheld from wages.

Wages are defined somewhat differently for different withholding tax purposes. Thus, federal income tax wages may differ from Social Security wages which may differ from state wages.

== Withholding on payments to foreign persons ==
Companies and individuals who make certain types of payments to foreign persons must withhold federal income tax on those payments. Foreign persons include nonresident aliens, foreign corporations, and foreign partnerships. Payments subject to withholding include compensation for services, interest, dividends, rents, royalties, annuities, and certain other payments. Tax is withheld at 30% of the gross amount of the payment. This withholding rate may be reduced under a tax treaty. This tax withheld is usually considered a final determination and payment of tax, requiring no further action or tax return by the foreign person. (Note: New provisions, to be effective after 2012, expand withholding requirement to include purchasers of stocks and bonds. The new rules apply to payments to foreign financial institutions and foreign entities. Withholding taxes covered by the new provisions are considered prepayments subject to potential refund. See [Hire Act] sections 501-513, adding new 26 USC sections 1471-1474.)

In addition, partnerships are required to make tax payments (referred to as withholding) on behalf of foreign partners. These payments are required regardless of whether income is actually distributed to the partner. Payments are also required quarterly or at year end for business income or other undistributed income. Partnership payments on business income are treated like estimated tax payments, and the foreign person must still file a U.S. tax return reporting the business income.

Purchasers of U.S. real estate must withhold 10% of the sales price from payments to foreign sellers. This amount can be reduced to the anticipated federal income tax due, upon advance application on Form 8288-B to the Internal Revenue Service. These payments are treated like estimated tax payments, and the foreign person must still file a U.S. tax return reporting any gain or loss.

== Backup withholding ==
Payers of interest, dividends, and certain other items must withhold 28% Federal income tax on such payments in limited circumstances. Generally, this applies only if the recipient is a U.S. person, and either

- the person has failed to provide a tax identification number on Form W-9 to the payer, or
- the Internal Revenue Service (IRS) has notified the payer that the payer must withhold.

== Payment of withheld taxes ==
Withheld taxes must be paid to the appropriate government promptly. Rules vary by jurisdiction and by balance of total payments due. Federal employment tax payments are due either monthly or semi-weekly. Federal tax payments must be made either by deposit to a national bank or by electronic funds transfer. If the balance of federal tax payments exceeds $100,000, it must be paid within one banking day. Beginning January 1, 2011, payments may be made only by electronic funds transfer. State rules vary widely, and generally allow slightly more time for deposit of withheld taxes.

== Reporting of withheld taxes ==
Employers must file a quarterly report of aggregate withholding taxes, Form 941, with the Internal Revenue Service. This report includes income, Social Security, and Medicare tax totals for the quarter. Partnerships making payments for partners must file Form 8813 quarterly. State requirements vary.

All persons withholding taxes must file annual Federal and state reports of the tax withheld and the amount subject to withholding. A copy must be provided to the employee or other payee. The relevant forms are as follows:

- Form W-2 series for wages (the Federal report is also used for states), due to employees by January 31. A summary is filed on Form W-3.
- Form 1042-S for payments to foreign persons, due to payees by March 15. A summary is filed on Form 1042.
- Form 8805 for partnership payments, due at the same time as the partnership return. A summary is filed on Form 8804.
- Form 1099 series for backup withholding

Federal filings must be done electronically if more than 250 forms are required. States generally do not require separate filings other than for partnerships, instead relying on information provided by the IRS.

== Penalties ==
Failing to pay Federal taxes withheld can result in a penalty of 100% of the amount not paid. This may be assessed against anyone responsible for the funds from which payment of withheld tax could have been made.

Paying withheld Federal taxes late may result in penalties up to 10%, plus interest, on the balance paid late. State penalties vary. Failure to timely file withholding tax forms may result in penalties up to $50 per form not filed.

Intentional failures may result in criminal penalties.

== See also ==
- Income tax in the United States
- IRS penalties
- Medicare (United States)
- Social Security (United States)
- United States v. Gotcher
