= Tax withholding =

Income tax paid to the government by the income-payer

Tax withholding, also known as tax retention, pay-as-you-earn tax or tax deduction at source, is income tax paid to the government by the payer of the income rather than by the recipient of the income. The tax is thus withheld or deducted from the income due to the recipient. In most jurisdictions, tax withholding applies to employment income. Many jurisdictions also require withholding taxes on payments of interest or dividends. In most jurisdictions, there are additional tax withholding obligations if the recipient of the income is resident in a different jurisdiction, and in those circumstances withholding tax sometimes applies to royalties, rent or even the sale of real estate. Governments use tax withholding as a means to combat tax evasion, and sometimes impose additional tax withholding requirements if the recipient has been delinquent in filing tax returns, or in industries where tax evasion is perceived to be common.

Typically, the withheld tax is treated as a payment on account of the recipient's final tax liability, when the withholding is made in advance. It may be refunded if it is determined, when a tax return is filed, that the recipient's tax liability is less than the tax withheld, or additional tax may be due if it is determined that the recipient's tax liability is more than the tax withheld. In some cases, the withheld tax is treated as discharging the recipient's tax liability, and no tax return or additional tax is required. Such withholding is known as final withholding.

The amount of tax withheld on income payments other than employment income is usually a fixed percentage. In the case of employment income, the amount of withheld tax is often based on an estimate of the employee's final tax liability, determined either by the employee or by the government.

== Basics ==
Some governments have written laws that require taxes to be paid before the money can be spent for any other purpose. This ensures the taxes will be paid first and will be paid on time, rather than risk the possibility that the tax-payer might default at the time when tax falls due in arrears.

Typically, withholding is required to be done by the employer of someone else, taking the tax payment funds out of the employee or contractor's salary or wages. The withheld taxes are then paid by the employer to the government body that requires payment, and applied to the account of the employee, if applicable. The employee may also be required by the government to file a tax return self-assessing one's tax and reporting withheld payments.

== Income taxes ==
=== Wage withholding ===
Most developed countries operate a wage withholding tax system. In some countries, subnational governments require wage withholding so that both national and subnational taxes may be withheld. In the U.S., Canada, and others, the federal and most state or provincial governments, as well as some local governments, require such withholding for income taxes on payments by employers to employees. Income tax for the individual for the year is generally determined upon filing a tax return after the end of the year.

The amount withheld and paid by the employer to the government is applied as a prepayment of income taxes and is refundable if it exceeds the income tax liability determined on filing the tax return. In such systems, the employee generally must make a representation to the employer regarding factors that would influence the amount withheld. Generally, the tax authorities publish guidelines for employers to use in determining the amount of income tax to withhold from wages.

The United Kingdom and certain other jurisdictions operate a withholding tax system known as pay-as-you-earn (PAYE), although the term "withholding tax" is not commonly used in the UK. Unlike many other withholding tax systems, PAYE systems generally aim to collect all of an employee's tax liability through the withholding tax system, making an end of year tax return redundant. However, taxpayers with more complicated tax affairs must file tax returns.

Australia operates a pay-as-you-go (PAYG) system, which is similar to PAYE. The system applies only at the federal level, as the individual states do not collect income taxes.

=== Other domestic withholding ===
Some systems require that income taxes be withheld from certain payments other than wages made to domestic persons. Ireland requires withholding of tax on payments of interest on deposits by banks and building societies to individuals. The U.S. requires payers of dividends, interest, and other "reportable payments" to individuals to withhold tax on such payments in certain circumstances. Australia requires payers of interest, dividends and other payments to withhold an amount when the payee does not provide a tax file number or Australian Business Number to the payer. India enforces withholding tax also on payments between companies and not just from companies to individuals, under the Tax Deducted at Source (TDS) system. (Since April 2016, the United Kingdom has discontinued withholding tax on interest and dividends, though in some cases this income will become liable for taxation through other means). Rwanda charges withholding tax on business payments unless the paying company obtains proof that the recipient is registered with the tax administration and that they have a recent income tax declaration.

== Social insurance taxes (social security) ==
Many countries (and/or subdivisions thereof) have social insurance systems that require payment of taxes for retirement annuities and medical coverage for retirees. Most such systems require that employers pay a tax to cover such benefits. Some systems also require that employees pay such taxes.

Where the employees are required to pay the tax, it is generally withheld from the payment of wages and paid by the employer to the government. Social insurance tax rates may be different for employers than for employees. Most systems provide an upper limit on the amount of wages subject to social insurance taxes.

== International withholding ==
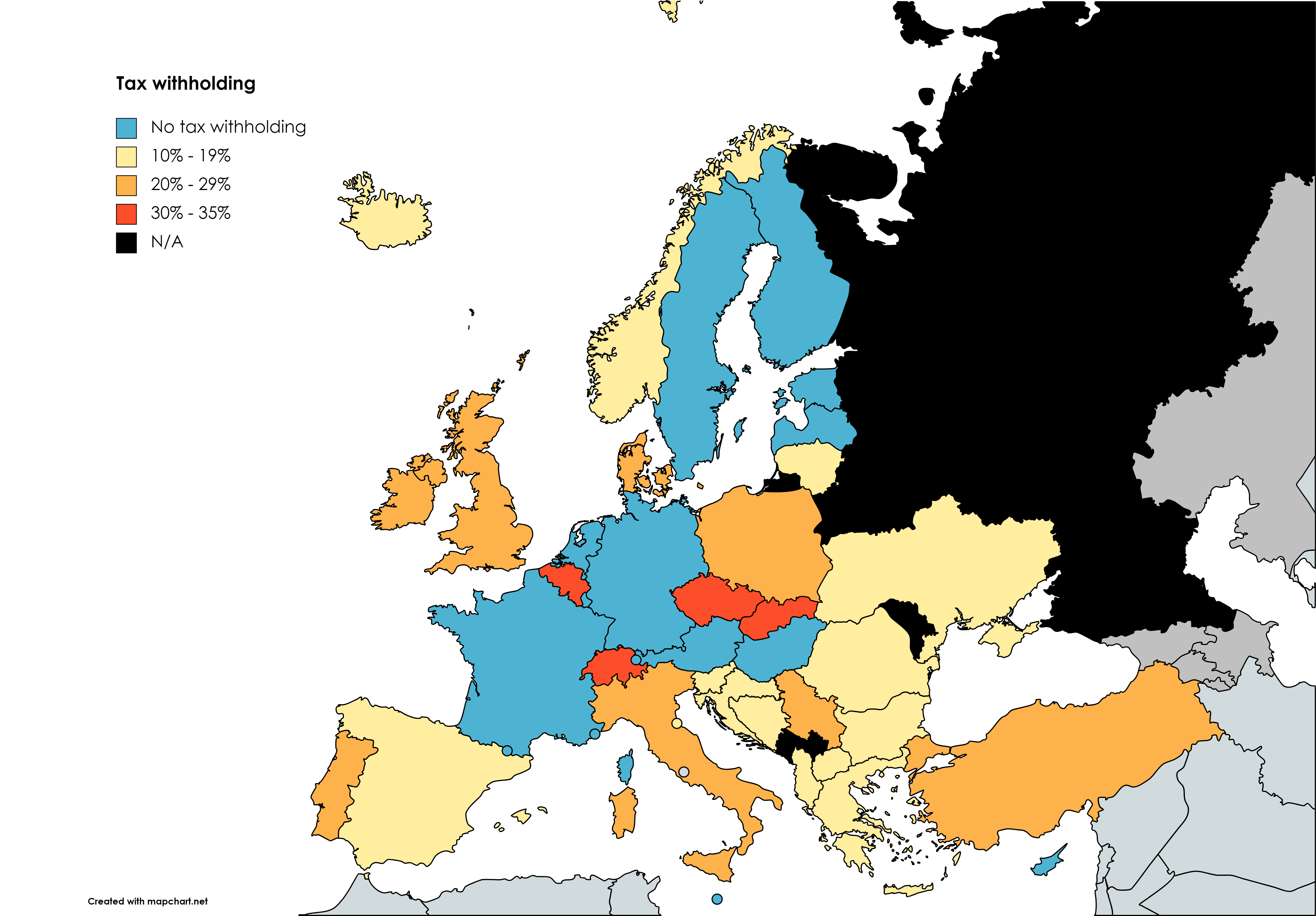
Europe map of the withholding tax rate (2023, from TradingEconomics)

Most countries require payers of interest, dividends and royalties to non-resident payees (generally, if a non-domestic postal address is in the payer's records) withhold from such payment an amount at a specific rate. Payments of rent may also be subject to withholding tax or may be taxed as business income. The amounts may vary by type of income. A few jurisdictions treat fees paid for technical consulting services as royalties subject to withholding of tax. Income tax treaties may reduce the amount of tax for particular types of income paid from one country to residents of the other country.

Some countries require withholding by the purchaser of real property. The U.S. imposes a 15% withholding tax on the amount realized in connection with the sale of a U.S. real property interest unless advance IRS approval is obtained for a lower rate. Canada imposes similar rules for 25% withholding, and withholding on sale of business real property is 50% of the price but may be reduced on application.

The European Union has issued directives prohibiting taxation on companies by one member state of dividends from subsidiaries in other member state, except in some cases, interest on debt obligations, or royalties received by a resident of another member nation.

Procedures vary for obtaining reduced withholding tax under income tax treaties. Procedures for recovery of excess amounts withheld vary by jurisdiction. In some, recovery is made by filing a tax return for the year in which the income was received. Time limits for recovery vary greatly.

Taxes withheld may be eligible for a foreign tax credit in the payee's home country.

== Remittance to tax authorities ==
Most withholding tax systems require withheld taxes to be remitted to tax authorities within specified time limits, which time limits may vary with the withheld amount. Remittance by electronic funds transfer may be required or preferred.

Penalties for delay or failure to remit withheld taxes to tax authorities can be severe. The sums withheld by a business is regarded as a debt to the tax authority, so that on bankruptcy of the business the tax authority stands as an unsecured creditor; however, sometimes the tax authority has legislative priority over other creditors.

== Reporting ==
Nearly all systems imposing withholding tax requirements also require reporting of amounts withheld in a specified manner. Copies of such reporting are usually required to be provided to both the person on whom the tax is imposed and to the levying government. Reporting is generally required annually for amounts withheld with respect to wages. Reporting requirements for other payments vary, with some jurisdictions requiring annual reporting and others requiring reporting within a specified period after the withholding occurs.

== See also ==
- International tax
- European Union withholding tax
- Tax withholding in the United States
