= IRS penalties =

Penalties for non-payment of tax in the United States

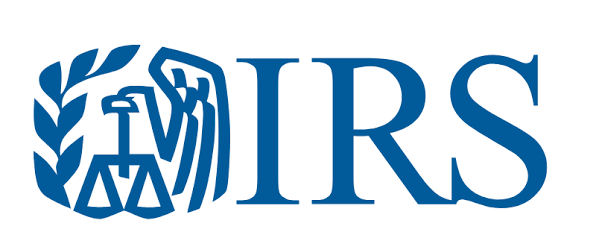

Taxpayers in the United States may face various penalties for failures related to federal, state, and local tax matters. The Internal Revenue Service (IRS) is primarily responsible for charging these penalties at the Federal level. The IRS can assert only those penalties specified imposed under Federal tax law. State and local rules vary widely, are administered by state and local authorities, and are not discussed herein.

Penalties may be monetary or may involve forfeiture of property. Criminal penalties may include jail time, but are imposed only by a federal judge after a defendant is convicted. Most monetary penalties are based on the amount of tax not properly paid. Penalties may increase with the period of nonpayment. Some penalties are fixed dollar amounts or fixed percentages of some measure required to be reported. Excise taxes used as penalties are imposed in the Code sections relating to particular kinds of transactions. Some penalties may be waived or abated where the taxpayer shows reasonable cause for the failure.

Penalties apply for failures to file income tax returns or information returns, or for filing incorrect returns. Some penalties may be very minor. Penalties apply for certain types of errors on tax returns, and may be substantial. Some penalties are imposed as excise taxes on particular transactions. Certain other penalties apply for other types of failures. Certain acts may result in forfeiture of property of the taxpayer.

There are over 150 kinds of civil penalties in the U.S. Internal Revenue Code, ranging in severity which is reflected in the amount of the applicable fines.

== Underestimate and late payment penalties ==
Taxpayers are required to have withholding of tax or make quarterly estimated tax payments before the end of the tax year. Because accurate estimation requires accurate prediction of the future, taxpayers sometimes underestimate the amount due. The penalty for paying too little estimated tax or having too little tax withheld is computed with interest on the amount that should have been, but was not, paid.

Where a taxpayer has filed an income or excise tax return that shows a balance due but does not pay that balance by the due date of the return (without extensions), a different charge applies. This charge has two components: an interest charge, computed as described above, and second a penalty of 0.5% per month applied to the unpaid balance of tax and interest. The 0.5% penalty is capped at 25% of the total unpaid tax.

The underestimate penalty and interest on late payment are automatically assessed.

== Penalties for failure to timely file returns or timely pay tax ==
Penalty for Failure to Timely File Return: If a taxpayer is required to file an income or excise tax return and fails to timely do so, a late filing penalty may be assessed. The penalty is 5% of the amount of unpaid tax per month (or partial month) the return is late, up to a maximum of 25%. A minimum penalty of $435 may apply for returns over 60 days late. The minimum penalty is the lesser of $435 or 100% of the tax due on the return.

Penalty for Failure to Timely Pay Tax: If a taxpayer fails to pay the balance due shown on the tax return by the due date (even if the reason of nonpayment is a bounced check), there is a penalty of 0.5% of the amount of unpaid tax per month (or partial month), up to a maximum of 25%.

Penalty for Failure to Timely Pay After Issuance of Notice: If a taxpayer fails to pay any additional tax assessed by the IRS (usually as a result of an audit which can be avoided) the taxpayer may be liable for a penalty equal to 0.5% for each month (or partial month) during which the failure continues, if the amount is not paid within 21 calendar days after the date of an IRS notice demanding the payment.

If both the failure to file and the failure to pay penalties apply during the same month, then the failure to file penalty is reduced by 0.5% each month.

The 25% cap above applies to the 5% late filing penalty and the 0.5% late payment penalty together. The late filing penalty may be waived or abated on showing of reasonable cause for failure. The failure to file penalty is imposed and starts to accrue interest from the due date of the return. The failure to pay penalty is imposed when a taxpayer pays the taxes after payment was due, computed from the date prescribed for paying the tax.

The Internal Revenue Service advises that if the taxpayer wants to compute the penalty for failure to timely file and the penalty for failure to timely pay the tax shown on the return, or the interest, and to pay those items at the time the return is filed, the taxpayer can "identify and enter the amount in the bottom margin" on the second page of Form 1040. The IRS advises that the taxpayer "not include interest or penalties (other than the estimated tax penalty)" in the "Amount Owed" line of the form.

== Accuracy related penalties ==
If amounts reported on an income tax return are later adjusted by the IRS and a tax increase results, an additional penalty may apply. This penalty of 20% or 40% of the increase in tax is due in the case of substantial understatement of tax, substantial valuation misstatements, transfer pricing adjustments, or negligence or disregard of rules or regulations. For example, a valuation overstatement can result in a 30% penalty on the amount of tax owed. Special rules apply for each of these types of errors under which the penalty may be waived.

== Penalties in connection with information returns ==
Certain types of returns, called "information returns," do not require payment of tax. These include forms filed by employers to report wages (Form W-2) and businesses to report certain payments (Form 1099 series instructions). The penalty for failures related to these forms is a dollar amount per form not timely filed, and the amount of penalty increases with the degree of lateness. The current maximum penalty for these forms is $50. Many of the forms must be filed electronically, and filing on paper is considered non-filing.

Late filing of returns of partnership income (Form 1065) can result in penalties of $195 per month per partner, up to a maximum of 12 months. Similar penalties may apply to an income tax return (Form 1120S) for an S corporation.

== 100% penalty on unpaid withholding taxes ==
Employers are required to withhold income and social security taxes from wages paid to employees, and to pay these amounts promptly to the government. A penalty of 100% of the amount not paid over (plus liability for paying the withheld amounts) may be collected without judicial proceedings from each and every person who had custody and control of the funds and did not make the payment to the government. This applies to company employees and officers as individuals, as well as to companies themselves. There have been reported cases of the IRS seizing houses of those failing to pay over employee taxes.

== Penalties for failure to provide foreign information ==
Taxpayers who are shareholders of controlled foreign corporations must file Form 5471 with respect to each such controlled foreign corporation. Penalties for failure to timely file are $10,000 to $50,000 per form, plus possible loss of foreign tax credits. U.S. corporations more than 25% owned, directly or indirectly, by foreign persons must file Form 5472 to report such ownership and all transactions with related parties. Failure to timely file carries a $25,000 penalty per required form. This penalty may be increased by $25,000 per month per form for continued failure to file. In addition, taxpayers who fail to report changes in foreign taxes used as credits against Federal income tax may be subject to penalties.

U.S. citizen or resident taxpayers (including entities) who are beneficiaries of a foreign trust or make transfers of property to a foreign trust must report information about the transfer and the trust or corporation. Failure to timely report on Form 3520 or Form 3520-A may result in penalties of up to 35%. Similar transferors to foreign corporations failing to file Form 926 may face penalties of 10% of the value of the transfer, up to $100,000.

== Excise taxes as penalties ==
Federal excise taxes are imposed on a variety of goods and services. Some of these taxes require purchase of tax stamps or other evidence of advance payment of tax. Some require collection of the tax by retailers. An assortment of penalties apply to manufacturers and retailers not complying with the particular rules.

In addition, certain penalties are imposed in the form of an excise tax. Pension and benefit plans must pay a tax for a variety of failures. Charities and private foundations must pay an excise tax on prohibited transactions and other failures.

== Tax fraud penalties ==
Intentional filing of materially false tax returns is a criminal offence. A person convicted of committing tax fraud, or aiding and abetting another in committing tax fraud, may be subject to forfeiture of property and/or jail time. Conviction and sentencing is through the court system. Responsibility for prosecution falls to the U.S. Department of Justice, not the Internal Revenue Service.

Penalties may be assessed against tax protesters who raise arguments that income tax laws are not valid, or who otherwise file frivolous returns or court petitions.

== Tax adviser penalties ==
Penalties also apply to people who promote tax shelters or who fail to maintain and disclose lists of reportable transactions their customers or clients for those transactions. These monetary penalties can be severe.

== Judicial appeal of penalties ==
Most penalties are subject to judicial review. However, the courts rarely modify assessment of the penalties and interest for underestimate or late payment.
