= Form W-4 =

IRS form for employee withholding

Form W-4, 2012

Form W-4 (officially, the "Employee's Withholding Allowance Certificate") is an Internal Revenue Service (IRS) tax form completed by an employee in the United States to indicate his or her tax situation (exemptions, status, etc.) to the employer. The W-4 form tells the employer the correct amount of federal tax to withhold from an employee's paycheck.

== Motivation ==
The W-4 is based on the idea of "allowances"; the more allowances claimed, the less money the employer withholds for tax purposes. The W-4 Form is usually not sent to the IRS; rather, the employer uses the form in order to calculate how much of an employee's salary is withheld. An employee may claim allowances for oneself, one's spouse, and any dependents, along with other miscellaneous reasons, such as being single with only one job. In the latter case, this creates an oddity in that the employee will have one more exemption on the W-4 than on the 1040 tax return. This is not a tax deduction in itself, but a procedure to prevent under-withholding for those who do not qualify. Nevertheless, it is legal to have "self" and "one job" allowances from the highest paid job, provided that all other jobs have zero allowances.

Each year, the IRS issues tax refunds to tens of millions of Americans. In 2011 alone, the IRS issued refunds to more than 100 million Americans. That means three out of four returns filed for 2011 called for money back. All told, the government sent about $318 billion to taxpayers, with the average refund being around $2,900. Claiming allowances on the W-4 and updating it frequently effectively lets the taxpayer claim refunds ahead of time, by not overpaying in the first place. Over-withholding can occur if, for example, an employee receives a one-time bonus, or only a partial year is worked, as it may only take into account the current paycheck, rather than the year-to-date amount. (I.e., withholding is calculated as if the employee earned this amount every payday on an annual basis.)

== Filing ==
The W-4 Form includes a series of worksheets for calculating the number of allowances to claim. One must provide some personal information and report the total allowances and additional withholding amounts on the actual form. The employee must tear off this certificate and hand it to their employer.

One may request an exemption from employer withholding (of income, but not payroll tax) if one had no income tax in the previous year and does not expect to owe any taxes in the current year.

If one works more than a single job or has a working spouse, the IRS recommends claiming all allowances on the W-4 Form for the highest paying job and claiming zero allowances for any other jobs. The IRS also recommends filing a new W-4 Form anytime a major life event occurs.

The W-4 Form itself does not indicate that anticipated losses can also be taken into account. If one expects a deductible loss from a business or rental activity or investment, for example, withholding can be adjusted to account for the resulting reduction in the tax bill.

Tax withholding depends on the employee's personal situation and ideally should be equal to the annual tax due on the Form 1040. When filling out a Form W-4 an employee calculates the number of Form W-4 allowances to claim based on their expected tax filing situation for the year. No interest is paid on over-withholding, but penalties might be imposed for under-withholding. Alternatively, or in addition, the employee can send quarterly estimated tax payments directly to the IRS (Form 1040-ES). Quarterly estimates may be required if the employee has additional income (e.g. investments or self-employment income) not subject to withholding or insufficiently withheld. Quarterly payments can also be required for a few years as a penalty for under withholding more than a nominal amount. There are specialized versions of the W-4 Form for other types of payment; for example, W-4P for pensions, and the voluntary W-4V for certain government payments such as unemployment compensation.

== See also ==
- Form W-2
- Form W-9
- Form 1040
- Personal exemption
- Tax withholding in the United States
