= Form 5472 =

IRS foreign ownership reporting form

Form 5472, revised 2023

Form 5472, officially titled the Information Return of a 25% Foreign-Owned U.S. Corporation or a Foreign Corporation Engaged in a U.S. Trade or Business, is an IRS tax form required under sections 6038A and 6038C of the Internal Revenue Code, used by foreign-owned United States companies or foreign corporations engaged in a United States trade or business to report ownership information and related-party transactions between the company and foreign related parties.

== History ==
Section 6038A of the Internal Revenue Code was first introduced with the Tax Equity and Fiscal Responsibility Act of 1982 (TEFRA). In 1985, the IRS published the first version of Form 5472.

In 2017, the Treasury issued new regulations under IRC §§ 7701 and 6038A classifying foreign-owned domestic disregarded entities, often single-member LLCs, "as corporation[s] for purposes of section 6038A", requiring such entities to file Form 5472 for taxable years during which they may have had reportable transactions with a related party.

== Foreign-owned disregarded entities ==
Although foreign-owned disregarded entities are not liable for corporate income tax, IRS instructions require them to file Form 5472 returns alongside a 'pro forma' corporate income tax return form (Form 1120), where only rudimentary information is completed.

It is not possible for disregarded entities to e-file these returns; instead, foreign-owned disregarded entities are required to fax or mail their returns to the IRS.

== See also ==
- Corporate tax in the United States
- Disregarded entity
