= Current Tax Payment Act of 1943 =

United States federal law that reintroduced income tax withholding

The Current Tax Payment Act of 1943, Pub. L. 68, Ch. 120, 57 Stat. 126 (June 9, 1943), re-introduced the requirement to withhold income tax in the United States. Tax withholding had been introduced in the Tariff Act of 1913 but repealed by the Income Tax Act of 1916. The Current Tax Payment Act compelled employers to withhold federal income taxes from workers' paychecks and pay them directly to the government on the workers' behalf. At the time of the act, Social Security payments and a World War II Victory Tax were already being withheld.

The introduction of the tax had significant impact on tax revenues for the US government. Income taxes collected in 1939 equalled, on average around 1% of personal income. Following the introduction of the act, the figure rose to above 11%, with the new law expected to raise $7.6 billion.

The act was signed into law by President Franklin D. Roosevelt.
