= Renunciation of citizenship =

Voluntary act of relinquishing one's citizenship or nationality

Renunciation of citizenship is the voluntary loss of citizenship. It is the opposite of naturalization, whereby a person voluntarily obtains citizenship. It is distinct from denaturalization, where citizenship is revoked by the state.

== Historic practices ==
The common law doctrine of perpetual allegiance denied an individual the right to renounce obligations to his sovereign. The bonds of subjecthood were conceived in principle to be both singular and immutable. These practices held on in varying ways until the late 19th century.

The refusal of many states to recognize expatriation became problematic for the United States, which had a large immigrant population. The War of 1812 was caused partly by Britain's impressment of US citizens born in the UK into the Royal Navy. Immigrants to the US were sometimes held to the obligations of their foreign citizenship when they visited their home countries. In response, the US government passed the Expatriation Act of 1868 and concluded various treaties, the Bancroft Treaties, recognizing the right to renounce one's citizenship.

== Historical events ==
=== Japanese American internment ===
During World War II, over 120,000 Japanese Americans were placed in internment camps throughout the West Coast of the United States. Conditions in the camps were often sub-par, with cruel emotional and sometimes physical mistreatment. This, along with a "loyalty questionnaire" that required the Japanese to renounce any loyalty to the Japanese Emperor, led a total of 5,589 Japanese American Nisei to renounce their American citizenship.

"My renunciation had been an expression of momentary emotional defiance in reaction to years of persecution suffered by myself and other Japanese Americans"

— Minoru Kiyota

== In modern law ==
Renunciation of citizenship is particularly relevant in cases of multiple citizenship, given that additional citizenships may be acquired automatically and may be undesirable. Many countries have pragmatic policies that recognize the often arbitrary nature of citizenship claims of other countries and negative consequences, such as loss of security clearance, can mostly be expected only for actively exercising foreign citizenship, for instance by obtaining a foreign passport. People from some countries renounce their citizenship to avoid compulsory military service. However, some people may wish to be free even of the purely theoretical obligations and appearance of dual loyalty that another citizenship implies. Even in countries that allow dual citizenship, such as Australia, Jamaica and Pakistan, electoral laws demand that politicians not be under an obligation of allegiance to any foreign country, and so when politicians have been found to be violating such laws, they stepped down and renounced their other citizenships in response to the public controversy. Another example may be political refugees who would wish to renounce allegiance to the country from which they escaped.

== Renunciation law in specific countries ==
Each country sets its own policies for formal renunciation of citizenship. There is a common concern that individuals about to relinquish their citizenship do not become a stateless person, and many countries require evidence of another citizenship or an official promise to grant citizenship before they release that person from citizenship. Some countries may not allow or do not recognize renunciation of citizenship or establish administrative procedures that are essentially impossible to complete.

Renunciation of citizenship is most straightforward in those countries which recognize and strictly enforce a single citizenship. Thus, voluntary naturalization in another country is considered as "giving up" of one's previous citizenship or implicit renunciation. For practical reasons, such an automatic renunciation cannot officially take place until the authorities of the original country are informed about the naturalization.

=== UN Signatories ===
Due to the United Nations Convention on the Reduction of Statelessness, renunciation in Canada and Australia is possible only if it will not result in statelessness. Applications for renunciation may have a waiting time of several months until approval.

=== Argentina ===
Argentina is one of the few countries in the world where its citizens cannot renounce their citizenship. According to Art. 75- section 12 of the Argentine Constitution, Art. 16 of Decree 3213/84 and judicial interpretation of the Supreme Court, the Argentine nationality is irrevocable. Argentines seeking citizenships in countries where multiple nationalities are prohibited can contact their Consulates to obtain proof of the irrevocability of Argentine nationality.

=== Colombia ===
The Colombian Constitution and its nationality law allow the renunciation of citizenship. The procedure is regulated by the Law 2332 of 2023. The process of renunciation requires the citizen to appear at a Colombian consulate if the petitioner lives outside of Colombia, or at the Ministry for Foreign Affairs if the petitioner resides in Colombia. To start the process, the petitioner must hold a nationality from a different country.

=== Germany ===
As of June 27, 2024, Germany has no restrictions on multiple citizenships. A German no longer loses German citizenship when naturalizing in another country and is not permitted to renounce unless they already hold another citizenship. This also removed the legislative authority in the Passport Act to require a German to report the acquisition of another nationality.

Germany used to actively investigate whether its citizens living abroad had become naturalized when they apply for a passport; for instance in Canada, German passport applicants had to submit a search of citizenship record if they could not show a valid immigration document, such as a Canadian permanent resident card.

=== Israel ===
Israel allows dual citizenship upon naturalization through the Law of Return, but Knesset (Israeli parliament) members are required to renounce all foreign citizenships.

=== Japan ===
In accordance with Japanese nationality law, the renouncing person is required to submit a formal report at an embassy.

=== Nigeria ===
The right to renounce Nigerian citizenship is established in May 29 of the 1999 Constitution of Nigeria, which states that "any citizen of Nigeria of full age who wishes to renounce his/her Nigerian citizenship shall make a declaration in the prescribed manner for the renunciation", which the government is obliged to register except when Nigeria is physically involved in a war or when the President of Nigeria is of the opinion that the renunciation is contrary to public policy. Under section 29(4)(a), a person of either gender becomes "of full age" at eighteen years, while under section 29(4)(b) a girl younger than that is still deemed to be "of full age" if she is married.

In 2013, the Senate of Nigeria proposed a constitutional amendment to delete section 29(4)(b), which would have the effect that girls could only renounce Nigerian citizenship at the age of eighteen or older regardless of their marital status; the amendment passed by a vote of 75–14, two votes greater than the two-thirds supermajority required for the passage of constitutional amendments. However, after the vote, a point of order was raised against the amendment by Senate Deputy Minority Leader Ahmad Sani Yerima (ANPP-Zamfara), who stated that Schedule 2 of the Constitution prohibited the National Assembly of Nigeria from legislating on any matters relating to customary or Islamic law. Some sources suggested that the amendment would have the effect of outlawing child marriage, a matter of personal concern to Yerima due to his 2009 marriage to an Egyptian girl, then only 13 years old. Senate President David Mark was initially disinclined to permit a second vote on the matter, but relented after an argument. Yerima's arguments were sufficient to convince enough erstwhile supporters and non-voters to oppose the amendment; with a vote of 60–35, it was deprived of its supermajority and failed to pass.

=== Singapore ===
Citizens of Singapore can only renounce Singaporean citizenship if they have acquired citizenship of another country. At the time of renunciation, renunciants must submit their Singaporean passports and National Registration Identity Cards for cancellation. Male Singaporeans generally cannot renounce citizenship until completing military service, though there are exceptions for those who emigrated at a young age (generally those who were not educated in Singapore). In 2012, a Hong Kong-born man who had acquired Singaporean citizenship by registration while a minor filed a lawsuit regarding this requirement.

About 1,200 Singaporean citizens renounce their citizenship every year, a quarter of them naturalised citizens. Singapore does not permit multiple citizenship for adults. The total number of renunciants from 2001 to 2011 was roughly 10,900. Of these, roughly half were Chinese Singaporeans (who comprise about three-quarters of the population), while the rest were of other ethnicities such as Malay or Indians (who comprise about one-quarter of the population).

=== United States ===
==== Overview ====
Although renunciation may be the most commonly used term when referring to loss of US nationality, renunciation is only one of the seven expatriating acts that may be performed voluntarily and with the intent to relinquish US nationality stated in section 349 of the Immigration and Nationality Act of 1952 (8 U.S.C. § 1481). People who relinquish U.S. citizenship are called "relinquishers", while those who specifically renounce U.S. citizenship are called "renunciants".

United States law requires that prospective renunciants appear in person before a consular officer at a US embassy or consulate outside the United States and sign an oath or affirmation that the individual intends to renounce US citizenship. Exceptions to this rule are permitted in times of war and under special circumstances. During the expatriation procedure, the individual must complete several documents and demonstrate in an interview with a consular officer that the renunciation is voluntary and intentional. Depending on the embassy or consulate, the individual is often required to appear in person two times and conduct two separate interviews with consular officers over the course of several months.

There were 235 renunciants in 2008, between 731 and 743 in 2009, and about 1485 in 2010; In 2011, there were 1781 renunciants. A total of 2,999 Americans renounced their citizenship in 2012–2013; in 2014, 3415 have renounced their USA citizenship or long term residency. The State Department estimates 5,986 renunciants and 559 relinquishers during FY2015. Renunciations rose to a record of 6,707 in 2020, up 237% from the year before.

Since 1998, the Federal Bureau of Investigation has also maintained its own list of people who have renounced citizenship under 8 U.S.C. § 1481(a)(5). This is one of the categories of people who are prohibited from purchasing firearms under the Gun Control Act of 1968, and whose names must be entered in the National Instant Criminal Background Check System (NICS) under the Brady Handgun Violence Prevention Act of 1993. The names are not made public, but each month the FBI issues a report on the number of entries added in each category. NICS covers a different population than the Federal Register expatriate list: the former includes only those who renounce US citizenship, while the latter should include those who voluntarily lose citizenship by any means, and possibly certain former permanent residents as well.

In fiscal year 2015, the State Department estimated there were 5,986 applications for renunciation of nationality, and forecast an additional 559 citizenship relinquishments. The discrepancy between this total of 6,545 compared to the 4,279 announced by the Treasury Department is speculated to be at least partly due to different counting of long-term green card holders, but no department of the government has released an official explanation.

In 2016, the Treasury Department published 1,151 names of people who expatriated in Q1 FY2016. For all of the year 2016, the published number of renunciants was 5,411, a 26% increase from 4,279 in 2015—a record high.

A summary of the difference between the NICS database of renunciants and the Federal Register of the mentioned renunciants and relinquishers of long-term residence status is summarized below.

Year	NICS	Federal Register
2011	658	1,819
2012	4,385	1,247
2013	3,128	2,414
2014	8,781	2,984
2015*	13,110	5,986

==== Certificate of Loss of Nationality ====
Formal confirmation of the loss of US citizenship is provided by the Certificate of Loss of Nationality (CLN) and is received by the renunciant a number of months later.

As recently as November 2014, individuals renouncing US citizenship waited up to 6 months for the official certificate of renunciation, while many renunciants, particularly those who renounced in consulates not located in the most common European cities such as London and Zurich, were never provided with a CLN and were told that the statement signed at the oath of renunciation is the only form given. Unofficial statements by the US State Department ascribe the problems to the fact that before 2010, the system was not efficiently designed and consular officers often improvised their own procedures based on the rough guidelines in their instructions. Since the 2010 enactment of the Foreign Account Tax Compliance Act (FATCA), the large increase in renunciations led the Department of State to re-organize the process so it is clear and follows the same steps in all consulates, although as of 2016, a backlog of several months still exists in many consulates.

==== Statelessness ====
Although many countries require citizenship of another nation before allowing renunciation, the United States does not, and an individual may legally renounce US citizenship and become stateless. Nonetheless, the United States Department of State warns renunciants that, unless they already possess a foreign nationality or are assured of acquiring another nationality shortly after completing their renunciation, they would become stateless and without the protection of any government.

In one case, Vincent Cate, an encryption expert living in Anguilla, chose to renounce his US citizenship to avoid the possibility of violating US laws that may have prohibited US citizens from "exporting" encryption software.

==== Renunciation fee ====
Renunciation of US citizenship was free until July 2010, at which time a fee of $450 was established. An increase of 422 per cent, to $2,350, effective September 6, 2014, was justified as "reflective of the true cost" of processing. Documentation of a prior relinquishment of US citizenship was free until November 9, 2015, when the renunciation fee of $2,350 was extended to cover all documentation of loss of citizenship.

On October 26, 2015, Forbes reported that during 2014, American dual citizens in Canada who were trying to renounce their U.S. citizenship created a backlog at the US Consulate in Toronto.

On March 13, 2026, the State Department published a rule in the Federal Register that the renunciation fee will be reverted to $450, effective April 13, 2026.

==== Taxation ====
People giving up US citizenship may be subject to an expatriation tax. Originally, under the Foreign Investors Tax Act of 1966, people determined to be giving up citizenship for the purpose of avoiding US taxation were subject to 10 years of continued taxation on their US-source income, to prevent ex-citizens from taking advantage of special tax incentives offered to foreigners investing in the United States.

In 1996, the Health Insurance Portability and Accountability Act included various changes to the tax treatment of people who give up US citizenship. First, it defined concrete criteria to determine whether an ex-citizen or ex-permanent resident was a "covered expatriate" presumed to have given up US status for tax reasons, based on the person's income and assets, or inability to certify compliance with their tax filing and payment obligations for the past five years (26 U.S.C. § 877(a)(2)). Second, it required the Department of the Treasury to "name and shame" people who give up US citizenship by listing their names in the Quarterly Publication of Individuals Who Have Chosen to Expatriate in the Federal Register (26 U.S.C. § 6039G(d). The list does not appear to contain the names of all people who give up US citizenship, though tax lawyers disagree whether that is because the list is only required to contain "covered expatriates", or due to bureaucratic errors or other reasons. Names of those renouncing in the last months of the year will mostly appear on the list before they have filed IRS form 8854 establishing covered or non-covered status, so it does not seem possible that the list is only required to contain covered expatriates.

Additionally, the Illegal Immigration Reform and Immigrant Responsibility Act of 1996 included a provision, the Reed Amendment (8 U.S.C. § 1182(a)(10)(E)), to bar entry to any individual "who officially renounces United States citizenship and who is determined by the Attorney General to have renounced United States citizenship for the purpose of avoiding taxation by the United States". However, former IRS lawyers, as well as the Department of Homeland Security, have indicated that the provision is unenforceable because there is no authority for the IRS to share tax return information to enforce it. DHS stated that they can only enforce the Reed Amendment when former US citizens "affirmatively admit to renouncing their U.S. citizenship for the purpose of avoiding U.S. taxation", and between 2002 and 2015 they denied entry to only two former US citizens on the basis of the amendment.

In 2008, Congress enacted the Heroes Earnings Assistance and Relief Act, which changed the expatriation tax to a one-time mark-to-market worldwide capital gains tax rather than ten years of taxation on US-source income. Effective June 2008, US citizens who renounce their citizenship are subject under certain circumstances to an expatriation tax, which is meant to extract, from the expatriate, taxes that would have been paid had he or she remained a citizen. All property of a covered expatriate is deemed sold for its fair market value on the day before the expatriation date, which usually results in a capital gain, which is taxable income. Eduardo Saverin, a Brazilian-born co-founder of Facebook, renounced his US citizenship just before the company's expected initial public offering. The timing prompted media speculation that the act was motivated by potential US tax obligations.

Since the enactment of FATCA in 2010, the numbers of people renouncing US citizenship have broken new records each year, increasing from a few hundred per year before FATCA to 6,707 in 2020. In the first two quarters of 2017 alone, 3,072 people renounced, which exceeds the full year total for 2013. In 2016, there were about 18 times more renunciations than in 2008, and the 2017 quarter 2 total (1,759) is more than 76 times that of quarter 2 in 2008 (23). Renunciants have reported that they feel forced to renounce under duress caused by FATCA but are prevented from saying this when renouncing. In 2024, American citizens created a new non-profit organization called Tax Fairness for Americans Abroad to lobby Congress to relieve long-term non-residents of most U.S. filing and tax obligations.
