= Exit cost =

Exit cost may refer to:

- Barriers to exit
- Exit fee, for example:
  - exit fee in rental contracts
- Exit tax (disambiguation):
  - Expatriation tax or emigration tax, a tax on persons who cease to be tax resident in a country
  - Departure tax, a fee charged (under various names) by a country when a person is leaving the country
  - Corporate exit tax, a tax on corporations who leave the country or transfer (virtual) assets to another country
- Transaction cost
