= Stimpson (company) =

American manufacturing company

- Type: Private Company
- Industry: Manufacturing
- Founded: 1852 in Manhattan, New York, USA
- Headquarters: Pompano Beach, Florida
- Products: Fastening technology, hardware, attaching machinery
- Brands: Wicks Unlimited
- Number of employees: 200-499
- Website: stimpson.com

Stimpson, formerly known as Edwin B. Stimpson Company, is a manufacturer based in Pompano Beach, Florida. It is one of the largest producers of grommets, washers, eyelets, snap sets, hole plugs and attaching machinery.

== History ==
The Edwin B. Stimpson Company was founded in 1852 and subsequently opened a 1,500 square foot factory in Lower Manhattan. The site of the original Edwin B. Stimpson Company office is now the site of Pace University. On 15 July 1907, the company became incorporated as the Edwin B. Stimpson Company in alignment with New York state law. The principal officers included the founder’s son Edwin B. Stimpson Jr. as President and Henry V. Rau as Vice President; the treasurer, Henry Rau, one of the original principal officers, purchased outright control of Stimpson Co. from the Stimpson family in the 1930s.

The company opened a 280,000-square foot manufacturing and distribution center in Pompano Beach, Florida in 1961. Ten years later the company moved its production of grommets and washers, eyelets, snap fasteners, attaching machines and finishing operations from Brooklyn, New York to a new manufacturing facility in Bayport, New York.

In July 2000, the company acquired Wicks Unlimited. Several months later they earned their ISO 9001 certification, which they continue to renew at regular intervals. In the mid-2000s, they moved their corporate offices and manufacturing operations to their Pompano Beach, Florida campus. In 2016 the company launched an online store and in 2018 it launched a total rebranding; which included shortening the name from Edwin B. Stimpson to simply Stimpson.

== Products ==
Stimpson produces a wide range of fasteners including grommets, washers, eyelets, snap sets, and hole plugs made of a variety of metals including brass, zinc, aluminum, and stainless steel. The company also produces attaching machines.

== Trade Organizations ==
Stimpson is active in several national and international trade organizations including the South Florida Manufacturing Association, Precision Metalworking Association, National Association of Manufacturers, Industrial Fabrics Association International, and the Specialty Graphics Imaging Association.

== See also ==
- Manufacturing in the United States
- Metalworking
