= American Jobs Creation Act of 2004 =

- Long title: An Act To amend the Internal Revenue Code of 1986 to remove impediments in such Code and make our manufacturing, service, and high-technology businesses and workers more competitive and productive both at home and abroad
- Acronyms (colloquial): AJCA
- Enacted by: the 108th United States Congress

Citations
- Public law: Pub. L. 108–357 (text) (PDF)
- Statutes at Large: 118 Stat. 1418–1660

Codification
- Acts amended: Internal Revenue Code of 1986

Legislative history
- Introduced in the House as H.R. 4520 by Bill Thomas (R-CA) on June 4, 2004; Committee consideration by Ways and Means; Passed the House on June 17, 2004 (251–178); Passed the Senate as the "Jumpstart Our Business Strength (JOBS) Act" on July 15, 2004 (voice vote); Reported by the joint conference committee on October 7, 2004; agreed to by the House on October 7, 2004 (280–141) and by the Senate on October 11, 2004 (69–17, 1 present); Signed into law by President George W. Bush on October 22, 2004

The American Jobs Creation Act of 2004 (Pub. L. 108–357 (text) (PDF)) was a federal tax act that repealed the export tax incentive (ETI), which had been declared illegal by the World Trade Organization several times and sparked retaliatory tariffs by the European Union. It also contained numerous tax credits for agricultural and business institutions as well as the repeal of excise taxes on both fuel and alcohol and the creation of tax credits for biofuels.

The bill was introduced by Representative Bill Thomas on June 4, 2004, passed the House June 17, the Senate on July 15, and was signed by President George W. Bush on October 22.

== Summary of provisions ==
The Office of Tax Analysis of the United States Department of the Treasury summarized the tax changes as follows:

- created deduction for income from U.S. production activities
- repealed exclusion for extraterritorial income
- changed interest expense allocation rules

A report by the Tax Policy Center identifies the following main provisions and their costs over a period of 10 years:

- repeal of the ETI over a 3 year period including transitional relief; expected to produce $49 billion in revenue
- U.S. production tax breaks of 9% of income from domestic production, with an expected cost of $77 billion
- assorted business tax relief provisions costing $7 billion
- international tax changes for a cost of $43 billion
- miscellaneous revenue generating provisions with a projected gain of $82 billion
- temporarily allowed taxpayer deduction of state and local sales taxes

Another provision revised the definition of the term "covered expatriate" which sets net worth and income tax liability thresholds used to determine if a person who renounces his/her U.S. citizenship must pay an expatriation tax.

== See also ==
- Extraterritorial income exclusion
- Foreign Sales Corporation
- Domestic international sales corporation
