= Reed Amendment (immigration) =

US legal instrument

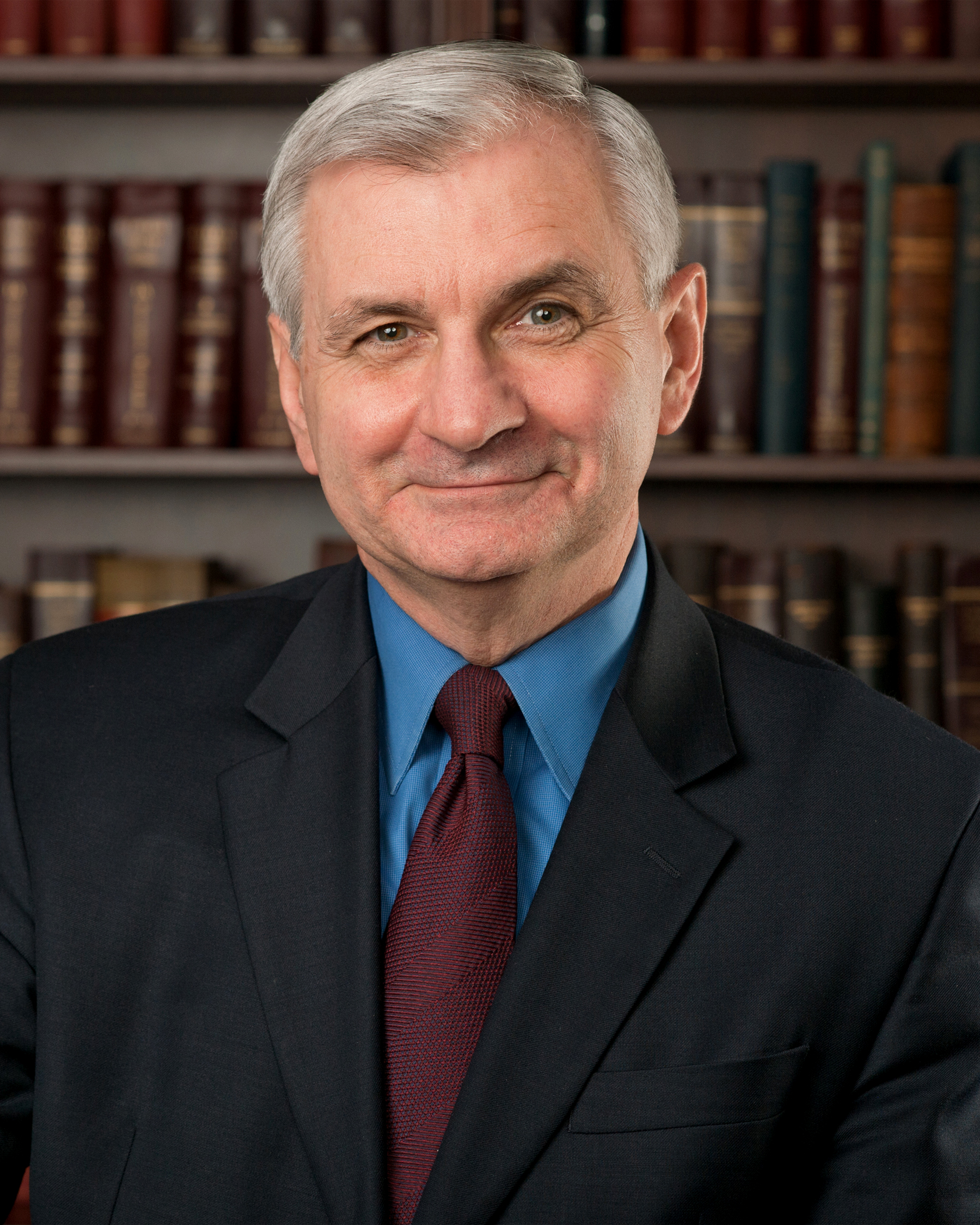
Reed Amendment author Jack Reed

The Reed Amendment, also known as the Expatriate Exclusion Clause, created a provision of United States federal law (8 U.S.C. § 1182(a)(10)(E)) attempting to impose an entry ban on certain former U.S. citizens based on their reasons for renouncing U.S. citizenship. Notably, entry can be denied to persons who renounced their U.S. citizenship to avoid paying income taxes. The United States is one of two countries in the world that taxes its citizens' income earned abroad for citizens whose primary residence is abroad. The other country to do so is Eritrea.

The Amendment was named for its author Jack Reed, and passed into law as part of the Illegal Immigration Reform and Immigrant Responsibility Act of 1996.

Though the Reed Amendment received strong bipartisan support during the committee stage, Democratic lawmakers including Daniel Patrick Moynihan later criticised it as inappropriate, embarrassing, and badly-drafted. Efforts at establishing procedures to enforce the amendment ran into early difficulties, and the executive branch never promulgated the implementing regulations. The Department of Homeland Security has stated that they cannot obtain the information required to enforce the amendment unless the former U.S. citizen "affirmatively admit[s]" his or her reasons for renouncing citizenship, and so from 2002 to 2015, only two people were denied entry to the United States on the grounds of the amendment.

Various Democratic and Republican politicians including Reed himself, Chuck Schumer, Chuck Grassley, Lamar S. Smith, and others have made many unsuccessful efforts to enact clearer definitions of the classes of former citizens to be banned from re-entry, and to enable executive agencies to share information with each other in order to enforce the ban.

== Overview and legislative history ==
The Reed Amendment added the following text to the Immigration and Nationality Act of 1952's list of "Classes of aliens ineligible for visas or admissions", under the "Miscellaneous grounds" category:

(E) Former citizens who renounced citizenship to avoid taxation

Any alien who is a former citizen of the United States who officially renounces United States citizenship and who is determined by the Attorney General to have renounced United States citizenship for the purpose of avoiding taxation by the United States is inadmissible.

This provision is located at INA 212(a)(10)(E) (8 U.S.C. § 1182(a)(10)(E)). It was introduced by then-Representative Jack Reed (D-RI).

Reed first introduced his eponymous amendment during the debate on the Immigration in the National Interest Act of 1995 (H.R. 2202). He stated that "there's no attempt by this legislation to prevent someone from renouncing their citizenship", but that people who did so for purposes of tax avoidance should "not be able to return to the United States". At the time, the issue of giving up U.S. citizenship for tax purposes was receiving a large amount of media attention, which also resulted in Congress adding provisions to the Health Insurance Portability and Accountability Act to broaden the "expatriation tax" (26 U.S.C. § 877) and to make public the names of people giving up U.S. citizenship. Reed's amendment ostensibly intended to address the issue of wealthy individuals who had renounced U.S. citizenship but then later attempted to obtain residency visas to return to the United States. One example discussed was Kenneth Dart of Dart Container, who had become a citizen of Belize and then attempted to obtain a diplomatic visa to serve as Belize's new consul in Sarasota, Florida. Florida Congressmen Sam Gibbons and Dan Miller both wrote to the State Department to protest, and by October 1995, the government of Belize had withdrawn its nomination of Dart as consul. Wealthy people who renounced U.S. citizenship for tax reasons were estimated to comprise about a dozen of the roughly one thousand people per year who became ex-Americans.

The House Committee on the Judiciary approved Reed's amendment by a vote of 25 to 5, over objections from opponents of the law arguing that it was punitive, difficult to enforce, and gave too much discretion to the Attorney General. All 12 Democratic members of the committee, as well as 13 of the 18 Republican members, voted in support; the five opposers were Howard Coble (R-NC), George Gekas (R-PA), Carlos J. Moorhead (R-CA), Bill McCollum (R-FL), and Lamar S. Smith (R-TX). Another similar bill, the Illegal Immigration Reform and Immigrant Responsibility Act of 1996, contained the Reed Amendment in its originally-introduced version, and went on to be enacted on September 30, 1996.

== Reactions ==
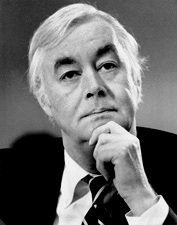
Senator Daniel Moynihan (D-NY) stated that the Reed Amendment "does not reflect well on a free society".

In the aftermath of IIRIRA's passage, Reed's fellow Democrat Daniel Patrick Moynihan made a speech on the Senate floor denouncing the Reed Amendment in harsh terms, saying: "The wording of the statute is embarrassing. How can an alien renounce U.S. citizenship? In what capacity would said alien do so officially? One assumes that a court of law would find the language incoherent and unenforceable ... This is the way we legislate at 5 o'clock in the morning 4 days before adjournment." Moynihan went on to state that it was inappropriate to use visa restrictions to enforce the tax law, called it a provision "which does not reflect well on a free society", and advocated for the alternative plan of modifying the expatriation tax to tax accrued capital gains instead.

Among various academics' and practitioners' criticisms of the law, Renee S. Liu describes it as "an inappropriate response" to the problem it sought to address, while Michelle Leigh Carter argues that it may "unconstitutionally infringe on the fundamental right to expatriate". Temple University law professor Peter Spiro also suggested that it conflicts with the Expatriation Act of 1868, as well as the guarantees in the Universal Declaration of Human Rights and the International Covenant on Civil and Political Rights that all people have the right to leave any country and to change their nationality.

== Official and unofficial enforcement ==
=== General issues ===
The U.S. government has never issued regulations to implement the Reed Amendment. One issue with the enforcement of the law was that the Attorney General was never authorized to obtain the required information from the Internal Revenue Service in order to be able to make the determination whether a former American's loss of citizenship was motivated by tax reasons. This restriction arises from 26 U.S.C. § 6103.

Michael G. Pfeifer of Caplin & Drysdale states that it is unclear whether the Reed Amendment is intended to apply to all persons "relinquishing" U.S. citizenship by committing an "expatriating act" with the intention of losing U.S. citizenship (all the acts listed in 8 U.S.C. § 1481(a), including (1) obtaining nationality in a foreign country, (2) swearing allegiance to a foreign government, (3) serving in a foreign military under certain conditions, or (4) working for a foreign government), or only those who specifically "renounced" by making a formal renunciation of nationality under § 1481(a)(5) or (6). Mark Nestmann of The Nestmann Group states that despite non-enforcement of the Reed Amendment, he advises his clients to avoid making a formal renunciation of nationality, and instead to naturalize as a citizen of a foreign country and then obtain a U.S. Certificate of Loss of Nationality on the basis of having committed an "expatriating act" under § 1481(a)(1).

=== At ports of entry ===
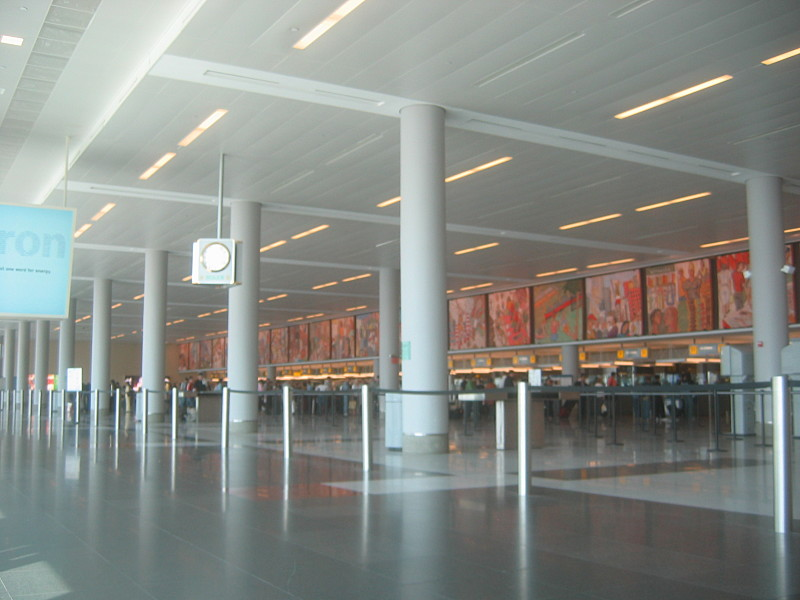
Passport control at John F. Kennedy International Airport. U.S. Customs and Border Patrol officers decide whether former U.S. citizens arriving in the U.S. are inadmissible based on the Reed Amendment. They have only found two people inadmissible in the past 15 years.

According to retired IRS international tax counsel Willard Yates, the former Immigration and Naturalization Service and the IRS' Office of Associate Chief Counsel (International) worked together in an effort to create procedures to work around the 26 U.S.C. § 6103 limitation. Under their proposal, the Customs Service (now Customs and Border Protection) would have been required to check the names of all aliens appearing at U.S. ports of entry against the list of former United States citizens published by the IRS under the Health Insurance Portability and Accountability Act of 1996. Those who were identified as former U.S. citizens would be required to sign a waiver of their rights under § 6103; Customs would then fax the waiver to the IRS so that the IRS could provide Customs with tax information relating to the former citizen, in particular whether the former citizen met the asset thresholds of 26 U.S.C. § 877(a)(2), and any private letter ruling regarding whether or not the former citizen had tax motivations for giving up U.S. citizenship.

However, there were various practical difficulties with these proposed regulations. Most notably, only one IRS agent would have been assigned to handling such requests; if a former U.S. citizen arrived on a weekend, he or she might have to be detained until Monday in order for border agents to make the required determination of tax motivation, as no IRS staff might be available to respond to the request for information on a weekend. Additionally, the IRS already had a large workload drafting other guidance for former citizens and green card holders under newly passed tax laws. Furthermore, DHS later indicated that even if the department were able to obtain tax information on former citizens, their agents "lack[ed] the expertise and resources to review tax filings meaningfully or engage in complicated tax liability analysis, involving both domestic and foreign tax law". In the end, the proposed regulations were never issued.

In June 2014, Reed used his position on the Senate Committee on Appropriations to insert language into the Senate report on one version of the Department of Homeland Security Appropriations Act, 2015 (S. 2534) directing DHS to report, within 90 days of the act's passage, on the steps it was undertaking to enforce the Reed Amendment, including a schedule for issuing guidance or regulations, if necessary. DHS' report, submitted to Congress in November 2015, stated that "there currently are no advisable options for altering enforcement of the inadmissibility ground against persons who do not affirmatively admit to renouncing their U.S. citizenship for the purpose of avoiding U.S. taxation". DHS considered implementing the Reed Amendment by presuming that a former citizen seeking entry had renounced U.S. citizenship for the purpose of avoiding taxation if he or she failed to pay the expatriation tax, obtained a windfall shortly after renunciation, or established residence in a tax haven, and placing the burden of proof on the individual to rebut this presumption; however, the department concluded that this procedure would have both many false negatives (failing to identify people who renounced for tax avoidance reasons) as well as many false positives (incorrectly denying entry to people who had other reasons for renouncing U.S. citizenship).

According to the DHS report, two individuals were denied admission to the United States on the grounds of the Reed Amendment between 2002 and 2015, while another five individuals "were identified as possibly inadmissible" on that basis but were not removed. Joel Paget of Ryan, Swanson & Cleveland states that one such denial (against a person who renounced before the enactment of the Reed Amendment) was reversed after the renunciant's lawyer submitted a legal brief to CBP.

=== In the visa application process ===
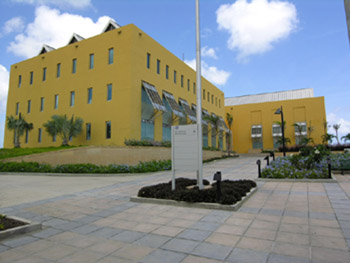
The U.S. Embassy in Bridgetown, Barbados (pictured) rejected ex-U.S. citizen businessman Roger Ver's application for a U.S. visa, but he states that he was later able to obtain a visa from the U.S. Embassy in Tokyo. Sources disagree whether the Reed Amendment had anything to do with this visa rejection.

According to the Foreign Affairs Manual (FAM), due to the lack of regulations, the Department of State has no procedures in effect to implement the Reed Amendment. The FAM instructs consular officers that "[t]he role of the Department and the consular officer is very limited in implementing this ground of inadmissibility. Unless the applicant appears as a hit in the lookout system revealing a finding of inadmissibility under INA 212(a)(10)(E), you must assume the applicant is eligible." Finally, the FAM states that a person who is found inadmissible due to the Reed Amendment could request a Waiver of Inadmissibility under INA 212(d)(3)(A) to obtain a non-immigrant visa, but that no waiver is available to obtain an immigrant visa.

Between 2000, the first year for which the State Department's Report of the Visa Office included the relevant statistics, and 2015, no consular officer found any visa applicant ineligible for entry into the United States on the grounds of the Reed Amendment. However in the Department of State Fiscal Year 2016 report, there were two INA 212(a)(10(E) findings and one ineligibility overcome; in FY 2017, there was one ineligibility finding and one overcome. Charles M. Bruce of Moore & Bruce LLP states that some U.S. consular officers may have "unofficially and improperly" applied the Reed Amendment to refuse issuance of visas to former U.S. citizens. Mark Nestmann similarly states that he knows of occasional cases in which former citizens have been denied U.S. visas, with consuls citing the Reed Amendment as their authority. Nevertheless, Eugene Chow of Chow & King Associates states that in spite of the Reed Amendment, consular officers "routinely issue visas" to ex-U.S. citizens, and the State Department's Office of the Legal Adviser has reversed denials based on the Reed Amendment after being made aware of them.

== Further unenacted legislative proposals ==
Since 2002, both Democratic and Republican legislators have introduced bills or amendments aiming to change the language of 8 U.S.C. § 1182(a)(10)(E) and clarify its scope. Academics have also written papers in legal journals suggesting changes to the Reed Amendment. None of these proposals have become law.

=== Baucus–Bingaman–Burns amendment ===
In June 2002, Max Baucus (D-MT), Jeff Bingaman (D-NM), and Conrad Burns (R-MT) sponsored an amendment to an appropriations bill to add a provision which would rewrite 8 U.S.C. § 1182(a)(10)(E) as follows:

(E) Former citizens not in compliance with expatriation revenue provisions.—

Any alien who is a former citizen of the United States who relinquishes United States citizenship (within the meaning of section 877A(e)(3) of the Internal Revenue Code of 1986) and who is determined by the Attorney General, after consultation with the Secretary of the Treasury, not to be in compliance with sections 877A and 2801 of such Code (relating to expatriation).

The Baucus-Bingaman-Burns amendment also included a variety of other spending offsets related to former citizens, among them new versions of the expatriation tax and the gift tax for ex-citizens (26 U.S.C. § 877A and 26 U.S.C. § 2801 mentioned in the above quote), as well as changes to 26 U.S.C. § 6103(i) to allow the Internal Revenue Service to share ex-citizens' tax information with the Attorney-General in order to enforce the entry ban. In September 2002, Tom Harkin (D-IA) added the same language to the Armed Forces Tax Fairness Act of 2002 during the Joint Committee on Taxation markup of the bill.

From then until 2008 (i.e. the 108th, 109th, and 110th Congresses), many veterans' benefits and tax bills introduced in the Senate contained the above provisions (i.e. the enactment of 26 U.S.C. § 877A and 26 U.S.C. § 2801, and the amendments to 8 U.S.C. § 1182(a)(10)(E) and 26 U.S.C. § 6103(i)), while the Senate Finance Committee or its members inserted these provisions into various House-originated bills as well. One of the attempts which saw the most support was in a Senate version of the Fair Minimum Wage Act of 2007, which passed the Senate 94-3 but was never brought up for consideration in the House. The last attempt to introduce this provision was by Amy Klobuchar (D-MN) in a renewable energy bill in February 2008. In June 2008, the expatriation tax and gift tax provisions of the original Baucus-Bingaman-Burns amendment (i.e. 26 U.S.C. § 877A and 26 U.S.C. § 2801), but not its inadmissibility or tax information privacy waiver provisions, passed into law as part of a veteran's assistance bill sponsored by Charles B. Rangel (D-NY).

=== SAFER Act ===
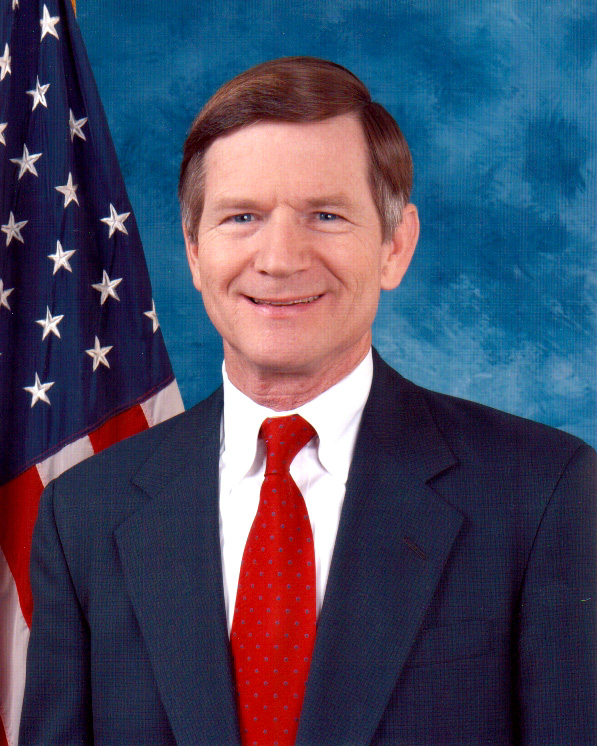
Representative Lamar S. Smith (R-TX), who originally opposed the Reed Amendment, later attempted to broaden it to cover all people who had renounced U.S. citizenship.

The Securing America's Freedom Through Enforcement Reform Act, an immigration reform bill introduced by Reed Amendment opponent George Gekas (R-PA) in July 2002, and co-sponsored by 44 other Republicans including fellow Reed Amendment opponent Lamar S. Smith (R-TX), would have broadened the entry ban in 8 U.S.C. § 1182(a)(10)(E) to cover all renunciants regardless of whether or not they had tax avoidance motivations:

(E) Former citizens who renounced citizenship.—

Any alien who is a former citizen of the United States who officially renounced United States citizenship is inadmissible.

The same provision was also included in bills introduced in 2003 and 2005; it did not pass either time.

=== Ex-PATRIOT Act ===
In May 2012, following news that Facebook co-founder Eduardo Saverin had renounced his U.S. citizenship, there was speculation that the Reed Amendment might be invoked against him, and Reed himself (by then senior RI senator) sent a letter to Secretary of Homeland Security Janet Napolitano urging her to bar Saverin from re-entry. However, Senator Chuck Schumer (D-NY) stated that the Reed Amendment "was written in a manner that inhibits its enforcement", and so he and Bob Casey (D-PA) introduced new legislation, the Ex-PATRIOT Act, which would make certain former U.S. citizens inadmissible to the United States and charge them 30% capital gains tax on their U.S. investments, but it died in committee. The following year, Reed himself, along with Schumer and Casey, moved the Ex-PATRIOT Act as an amendment to the Border Security, Economic Opportunity, and Immigration Modernization Act of 2013, but their amendment did not appear in the final version of the bill which passed the Senate in June that year, nor in the version of the bill which was introduced in the House in October that year.

=== Other ===
In the American Jobs Creation Act of 2004, Congress amended the law concerning the expatriation tax, adding provisions to account for the possibility that a former citizen who met the asset or tax liability thresholds to trigger the tax might subsequently spend significant amounts of time in the United States. Kirsch describes this as "implicit recognition" of the "substantive and technical problems" of the Reed Amendment. Kirsch outlined an alternative proposal to more narrowly tailor the Reed Amendment in a way he suggested would make it enforceable.
