= Anti-Dumping Committee of Indonesia =

The Anti-Dumping Committee of Indonesia (Indonesian: Komite Anti Dumping Indonesia; KADI) is a government-sanctioned body in Indonesia established in 1996. The committee reports directly to the Minister of Trade.

It is responsible for dealing with unfair trade practices hurting the country's domestic markets, such as dumping (Imported goods priced below normal value) and unfair subsidies (Imported goods receiving government financial aid from their country of origin).

The committee is responsible for investigating potential cases of dumping and hurtful subsidies, and may recommend remedial actions to the Minister of Trade, which include tariffs and countervailing duties to reduce injury caused by such unfair practices.

As of 2010, the committee has investigated 38 cases of dumping practices, with antidumping duties imposed on 16 commodities. These 16 commodities, which originate from countries such as China, Russia, India, Thailand, Taiwan, have had antidumping duties imposed onto them, ranging from 0 to 153 percent.

== Cases ==
=== 2009 ===
In March, the Indonesian Association of Synthetic Fiber Producers (APSYFI), on behalf of domestic producers of Polyester Synthetic Fiber (PSF), filed a formal complaint to KADI, requesting an investigation into potential dumping practices committed by Chinese PSF exporters.

After a thorough investigation involving sending questionnaires to various stakeholders, including Chinese exporters and domestic producers, and on-site verifications in China to cross-check the responses from the exporters, the committee revealed its findings that some Chinese companies engaged in unfair dumping practices by selling their PSF at below market prices.

Based on the investigation, the committee recommended imposing antidumping duties on the imports of PSF from China to protect local Indonesian industries from continued loss due to unfair pricing.

=== 2024 ===
In October, KADI concluded its five-year-long investigation into hot rolled plate (HRP) steel imports from China. Findings from the investigation uncovered that Chinese HRP steel was sold to indonesia at prices 10% lower than in China's domestic markets, severely undercutting Indonesian steel producers. As a result, the committee recommended that antidumping duties be extended by up to 50%.
