= Ex-PATRIOT Act =

Proposed 2012 United States law

Expatriation Prevention by Abolishing Tax-Related Incentives for Offshore Tenancy Act
- Long title: A bill to amend the Internal Revenue Code of 1986 to provide that persons renouncing citizenship for a substantial tax avoidance purpose shall be subject to tax and withholding on capital gains, to provide that such persons shall not be admissible to the United States, and for other purposes.
- Acronyms (colloquial): Ex-PATRIOT Act

Legislative history
- Introduced in the Senate as S. 3205 by Chuck Schumer (D-NY) on May 17, 2012; Committee consideration by Senate Committee on Finance

The Ex-PATRIOT Act was a proposed United States federal law to raise taxes and impose entry bans on certain former citizens and departing permanent residents. The law would automatically classify all people who relinquished U.S. citizenship or permanent residence in the decade prior to the law's passage or any future year as having "tax avoidance intent" if they met certain asset or tax liability thresholds or had failed to file any required federal tax forms within the preceding five years. People determined to have "tax avoidance intent", referred to in the text of the law as specified expatriates, would be affected in two ways. First, they would have to pay 30% capital gains tax on any U.S. property sold after the law's enactment. Second, they would be barred from re-entry into the U.S. either under immigrant or non-immigrant categories.

The Ex-PATRIOT Act was first introduced as S. 3205 in the 112th Congress in 2012 by Senator Chuck Schumer and four co-sponsors, but died in committee. Schumer and two other senators moved similar provisions in the 113th Congress as Senate Amendment 1252 to a major immigration reform bill, but their amendment was not included in the version of the bill that passed the Senate.

== History ==
The short title of the Ex-PATRIOT Act is a backronym for "Expatriation Prevention by Abolishing Tax-Related Incentives for Offshore Tenancy Act". The long title of the Ex-PATRIOT Act as given in its Section 1 is:

A bill to amend the Internal Revenue Code of 1986 to provide that persons renouncing citizenship for a substantial tax avoidance purpose shall be subject to tax and withholding on capital gains, to provide that such persons shall not be admissible to the United States, and for other purposes.

It was sponsored by Chuck Schumer (D-New York) with initial co-sponsors Bob Casey Jr. (D-Pennsylvania), Richard Blumenthal (D-Connecticut), and Tom Harkin (D-Iowa). It was introduced on May 17, 2012, and referred to the Senate Committee on Finance, of which Schumer is a member (on the Subcommittee on Taxation and IRS Oversight, among other subcommittees). Schumer's fellow Subcommittee on Taxation and IRS Oversight member Ben Cardin (D-Maryland) joined as an additional co-sponsor on May 23.

The introduction of the Ex-PATRIOT Act was motivated by the news that Facebook co-founder Eduardo Saverin had renounced his U.S. citizenship. Saverin, a native of Brazil, lived in the U.S. from 1992 to 2009 before moving to Singapore. While living in Singapore, he continued to pay U.S. taxes, as the U.S. is one of the only countries which imposes tax on non-resident citizens. In January 2011, he began the procedure to renounce U.S. citizenship in favor of retaining his existing Brazilian citizenship; he did not apply to take up Singaporean citizenship. His loss of citizenship was effective from September 2011. On April 30, 2012, his name was published in the Quarterly Publication of Individuals Who Have Chosen to Expatriate in the Federal Register as required by the Health Insurance Portability and Accountability Act of 1996. The story was reported in Bloomberg Businessweek and other news outlets roughly ten days later. The Ex-PATRIOT Act bill received additional coverage in July 2012 when it was revealed that singer-songwriter Denise Rich had renounced her citizenship as well. However the Senate Committee on Finance did not take any action on the bill by the end of the session.

On June 12, 2013, Casey moved Senate Amendment 1252 to the Border Security, Economic Opportunity, and Immigration Modernization Act of 2013, a major immigration reform bill. His co-sponsors for the amendment were Schumer and Jack Reed (D-RI). The text of the amendment was identical to that of Schumer's Ex-PATRIOT Act the previous year. In a press release about the amendment, Reed stated, "American citizenship is a privilege. But it seems that a privileged few are trying to game the system by accumulating wealth and benefiting from the greatness of the United States and then renouncing their citizenship to avoid paying their fair share of taxes. They are welcome to leave our country, but they should not be welcomed to return without playing by the rules and paying what they owe." The immigration reform bill passed the Senate on June 27, 2013, without the inclusion of Casey's amendment.

== Effects ==
=== Tax law ===
Under current law, 26 U.S.C. § 877A imposes an expatriation tax on "covered expatriates". The term "covered expatriates" is defined in 26 U.S.C. § 877(a)(1) as former citizens or long-term residents whose world-wide assets exceeded $2 million, whose five-year average tax liability exceeded $148,000, or who could not certify that they complied with their U.S. tax obligations for the five years preceding their loss of citizenship. The tax is equivalent to the 15% capital gains tax that would be paid on a sale at the marked-to-market value of all of the former citizen's property. When Saverin renounced, he had to pay that expatriation tax. Going forward, under existing law he receives similar treatment to other non-resident aliens: he is exempt from U.S. capital gains tax on U.S. investments, but is subject to a 30% withholding tax on U.S.-source dividends and interest payments. He is no longer subject to U.S. gift or estate taxes; however, 26 U.S.C. § 2801 imposes an equivalent inheritance tax on U.S. citizen or U.S. resident heirs of covered expatriates.

Section 2 of the Ex-PATRIOT Act amends 26 U.S.C. § 871(a)(2) to impose new taxes on certain "covered expatriates". In the new Subparagraph C, it defines the term "specified expatriate", a subset of "covered expatriate". A "specified expatriate" is defined in clause (i) as any "covered expatriate" who lost citizenship or permanent residence within the ten-year period before the bill's date of enactment, as well as future "covered expatriates". Clause (ii) exempts those who prove that their loss of citizenship "did not result in a substantial reduction in taxes". The new subparagraph A provides for the imposition of capital gains tax on "specified expatriates" at the same 30% rate as non-resident aliens who are present in the United States for more than 183 days in a tax year. Subparagraph B provides that the tax basis of a "specified expatriate" in U.S. property shall be the value of that property on the day preceding loss of citizenship.

=== Immigration law ===
Since 1996, INA § 212(a)(10)(E) (commonly known as the Reed Amendment) makes former citizens inadmissible to the United States if the Attorney General determines that they gave up citizenship to avoid taxation; however, it has never been enforced because the Attorney General is not empowered to obtain the required information in order to make that determination. There was speculation that the Reed Amendment might be enforced against Saverin, and Reed Amendment author Senator Jack Reed (D-Rhode Island) wrote to Secretary of Homeland Security Janet Napolitano to urge that Saverin be barred from entering to the United States; however, Schumer stated that the Reed Amendment lacked an enforcement mechanism, and that his newly proposed Ex-PATRIOT Act was necessary to remedy this.

Section 3 of the Ex-PATRIOT Act amends INA § 212(a)(10)(E), striking the whole text of the Reed Amendment and replacing it. The new clause (i) makes "specified expatriates" inadmissible. The new clause (iii) requires the Secretary of Treasury to notify the Secretary of State and the Secretary of Homeland Security of the name of each "covered expatriate" who has been determined not to be a "specified expatriate". Section 3 of the Ex-PATRIOT Act also amends INA § 212(d)(3) to make the Secretary of Homeland Security and not the Attorney General responsible for processing waivers of inadmissibility for "specified expatriates" seeking admission to the U.S. as non-immigrants.

== Reactions ==
=== Legislators ===
Senator Orrin Hatch (R-Utah), who was at the time the ranking minority member of the Senate Committee on Finance, stated in an interview that while he was unfamiliar with Schumer's proposed legislation, "[i]t always bothers me when somebody renounces his citizenship in the greatest country on Earth just to save money, save taxes ... I was really upset at Eduardo Saverin for doing that, and there are others who are doing it too." House Speaker John Boehner (R-Ohio) described Saverin's action as "absolutely outrageous" and spoke favorably of the concept of Schumer's bill, but also stated that existing legislation should be sufficient to punish Saverin. In contrast, Ron Paul (R-Texas) expressed opposition to the Ex-PATRIOT Act, stating that it "will ensnare many ordinary middle-class Americans" due to inflation and that "control[ling] people by controlling their capital ... has no place in a free society".

=== Others ===
Yale Law School professor Bruce Ackerman wrote an op-ed in the Los Angeles Times supporting the Ex-PATRIOT Act, stating that former citizens "should be allowed to return only under exceptional circumstances ... [T]hey either remain Americans or they repudiate their homeland forever". Matthew Yglesias wrote in Slate that the proposal "seems very reasonable", though he also parodied the more extreme reactions to Saverin's renunciation with a "modest proposal" that former citizens should be subject to targeted killing by drone attacks. Columnist Ruben Navarette also criticized Saverin for his "cavalier" renunciation while "hundreds of thousands of undocumented DREAM Act students" suffered due to their own lack of U.S. citizenship.

Conor Friedersdorf, writing in The Atlantic, stated that "it is imprudent to impulsively introduce legislation in order to target a specific high profile individual who happens to be making news, especially when doing so punishes him in a way he couldn't have anticipated for doing something that was legal. Anyone who doesn't understand that much philosophy of law doesn't deserve to be in Congress." Americans for Tax Reform president Grover Norquist spoke out against the Ex-PATRIOT Act in stronger terms, comparing it to Nazi Germany's Reich Flight Tax and East Germany's treatment of emigrants. Schumer responded angrily to the criticism in a speech on the Senate floor on May 24, 2012.

Saverin himself issued a statement through his spokesman Tom Goodman stating that he was "obligated to and will pay hundreds of millions of dollars in taxes to the United States government" and that he felt it was "unfortunate that my personal choice has led to a public debate, based not on the facts but entirely on speculation and misinformation".
