= CVD =

CVD may refer to:

== Medicine ==
- Cardiovascular disease
- Cerebrovascular disease
- Color vision deficiency, also known as color blindness

== Technology ==
- Chemical vapor deposition
  - CVD diamond, produced by chemical vapor deposition
- China Video Disc, a CD-based video format
- Coordinated vulnerability disclosure, a computer-security practice

== Other uses ==
- Countervailing duties or anti-subsidy duties
- COVID-19
- Card Verification Data or Card Verification Value, for payment cards
