= Exit tax (disambiguation) =

Exit tax may refer to:

- Exit tax, expatriation tax or emigration tax, a tax on persons who cease to be tax resident in a country
- Corporate exit tax, a payment made for discontinuation of certain economic activities within corporate groups, tax for leaving the country or transferring assets to another country
- Departure tax, a fee charged (under various names) by a country when a person is leaving the country
