= Exit fee =

Exit fee may refer to:

- Corporate exit tax
- Fees paid for early withdrawal from a contract: see Pricing#Exit fees
- Fees paid on withdrawal from an investment fund: see Investment fund#Fee types
