= Extraterritorial income exclusion =

Extraterritorial income exclusion, under the U.S. Internal Revenue Code, was the amount excluded from a taxpayer's gross income for certain transactions that generate foreign trading gross receipts.
In general, foreign trading gross receipts include gross receipts from the sale, exchange, lease, rental, or other disposition of qualifying foreign trade property. Foreign trading gross receipts also include receipts from certain services provided in connection with such property, as well as engineering and architectural services for construction projects outside the United States.

Extraterritorial income is the gross income of the taxpayer attributable to foreign trading gross receipts. The taxpayer reported all of its extraterritorial income on its tax return. The taxpayer used Form 8873 to calculate its exclusion from income that is qualifying foreign trade income.

It was abolished when in late 2004, US President George W Bush signed the American Jobs Creation Act of 2004 which phased out the extraterritorial income (ETI) exclusion in favor of broader tax relief. ETI deduction benefits are not available for transactions entered into after 2006.

== Qualifying foreign trade property ==
Qualifying foreign trade property generally includes property that is held primarily for sale or lease for direct use or consumption outside the United States. Form 8873 is attached to the taxpayers income tax return. Both corporate and non-corporate taxpayers who have qualifying transactions may now be required to file Form 8873. The exclusion reported on Form 8873 was created by the Foreign Sales Corporation (FSC) Repeal and Extraterritorial Income Exclusion Act of 2000. The new exclusion applies to certain transactions entered into after September 30, 2000, but is subject to transition rules for foreign corporations with a valid FSC election in effect on September 30, 2000.

== Extra-Territorial Income Exclusion Act ==
The FSC Repeal and Extraterritorial Income Exclusion Act of 2000 effectively 'repatriated' the FSC tax break and extended it to all types of entities with qualifying foreign sales, including S corporations and Limited liability companies previously excluded. Foreign companies that are U.S. taxpayers could also use the tax break, which was not the case previously. There are rules requiring a certain proportion of U.S.-manufactured content and a certain proportion of foreign costs. Foreign tax credits on the goods concerned are not available to a participating entity. Actual manufacture can take place either inside or outside the United States.

As under the previous law, the benefit applied to exports and a 50% U.S.-content rule remained. Those features caused the new regime to continue to resemble an export tax subsidy. In response, the Administration pointed to the elimination of administrative transfer pricing rules. However, the separate company requirement of the FSC and DISC legislation had been eliminated. Without the need for two companies – a manufacturing company and a sales company – no need existed for transfer pricing rules.

== Dispute with European Union ==
The European Union (EU) did not accept the new legislation as conforming with WTO rules. After a long series of hearings and appeals, the WTO ruled definitively against the ETI rules in late 2002. The EU then prepared a list of U.S. products on which the EU intended to apply sanctions in the form of countervailing duties. The EU obtained the WTO's permission for such action, which the EU put into effect in early 2004 in the absence of a substantial change in the ETI regime. The phase-out/repeal of the ETI deduction described above is considered to be the response to this threat.

== See also ==
- Foreign Sales Corporation
- Domestic international sales corporation
- List of international trade topics
