= Manufacturing in the United States =

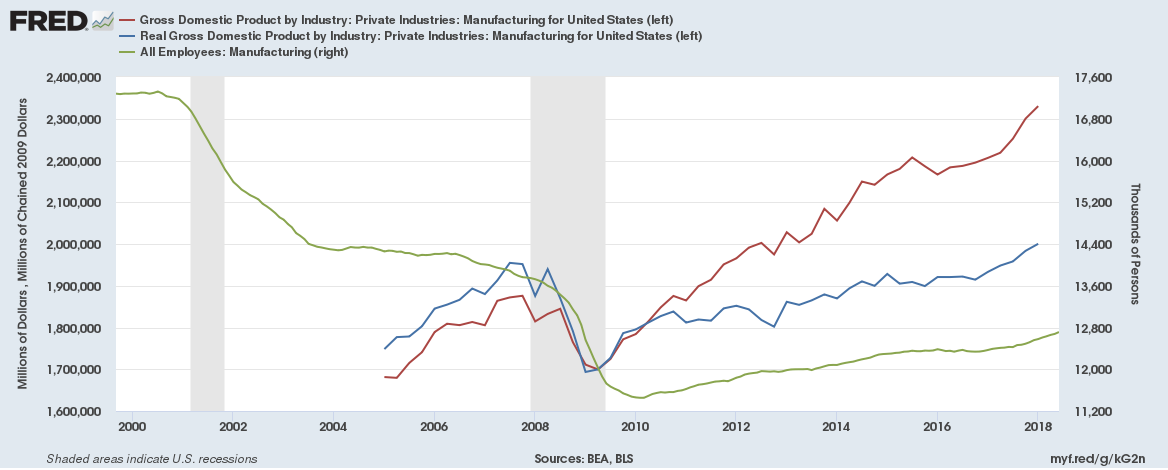
Manufacturing output in the United States is at an all-time high as of 2023, but employment in the sector has been stagnant following a lengthy decline in the late 20th century.

Manufacturing is a vital economic sector in the United States of America. The United States is the world's second-largest manufacturer after the People's Republic of China with a record high real output in 2024 of $2.913 trillion.

As of December 2024, the U.S. manufacturing industry employed 12.76 million people. Though still a large part of the US economy, in Q1 2025 manufacturing contributed less to GDP than the 'Finance, insurance, real estate, rental, and leasing' sector, the 'Government' sector, or 'Professional and business services' sector.

After the Great Recession ended around 2009, manufacturing output recovered. It reached an all-time high in 2024, but manufacturing employment has been declining since the 1990s, giving rise to what is known as a "jobless recovery," which made job creation or preservation in the manufacturing sector an important topic in the 2016 United States presidential election.

== Employment ==
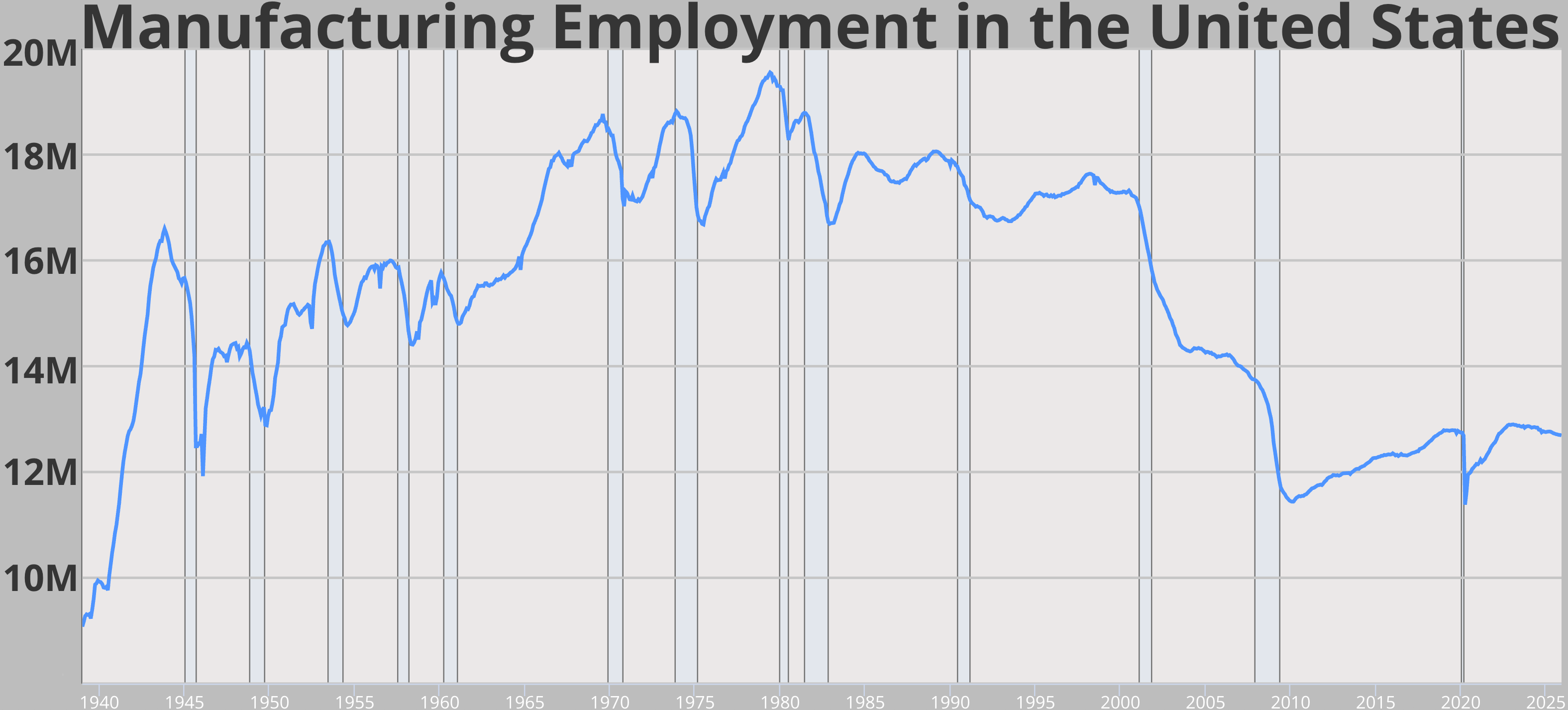
Recessions cause contractions in manufacturing employment, from a lack of demand.

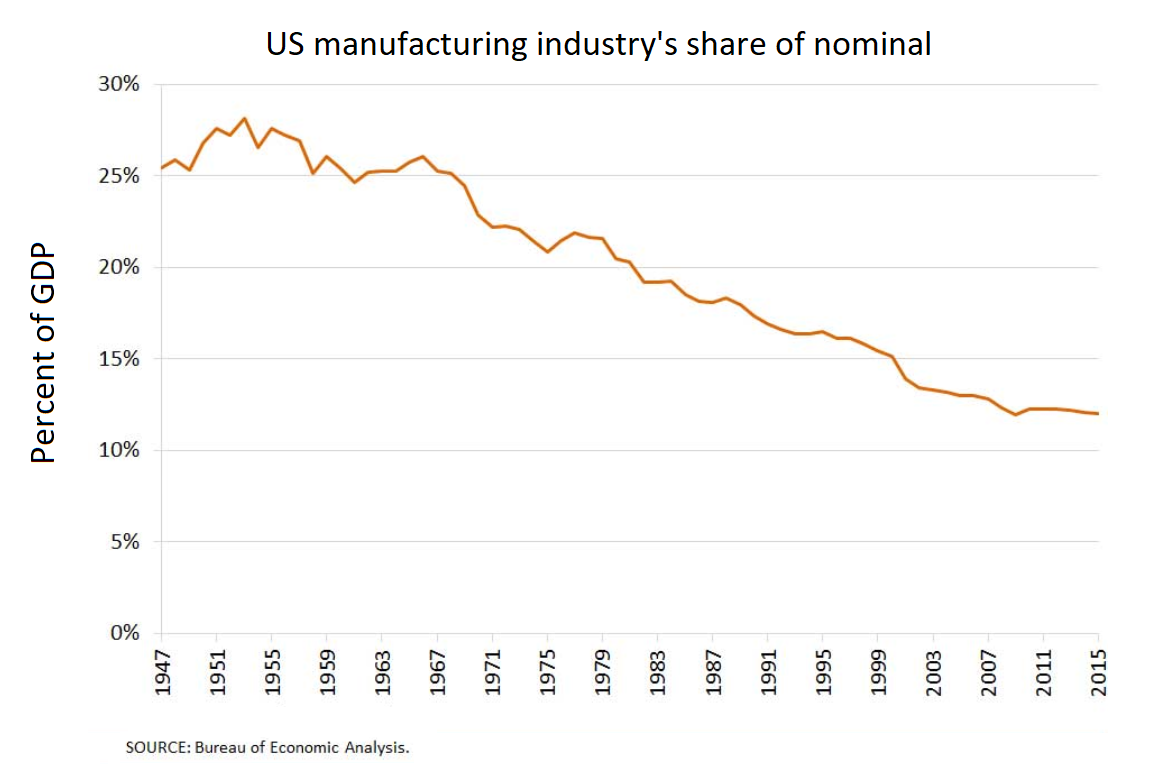
U.S. manufacturing industry's share of nominal GDP

Manufacturing jobs helped build out the U.S. middle class following World War II, as the U.S. established pro-labor policies and faced limited global competition. Between 1980 and 1985, and then again 2001 to 2009, there were precipitous declines in US manufacturing jobs; it is estimated that 1/3 of U.S. manufacturing jobs vanished in the eight years between 2001 and 2009, and few have returned, the worst period for U.S. manufacturing since the Great Depression.

Since 1979, the number of U.S. manufacturing employment has been declining, especially the sharp decline in 2001 and 2007. The way in which employment in the U.S. manufacturing industry has fallen provides a series of potential policy responses including insights into how the industry is changing, and unemployment.

There are several possible explanations for the decline. Bill Lazonick argues that legalization of companies buying their own shares of stock in 1982 has led to sustained stock market bubbles that distorted investment away from physical plant. Others point to automation or developments outside the United States, such as the rise of China, globalized free trade, and supply chain innovation. These have arguably resulted in the off-shoring of thousands of U.S. manufacturing facilities and millions of manufacturing jobs to lower-wage countries. Meanwhile, technological innovation has increased productivity significantly, meaning that manufacturing output in the United States has increased by 80% since the 1980s, despite large job losses in the manufacturing sector during that same period.

The Bureau of Labor Statistics (BLS) forecast in October 2017 that manufacturing employment would fall from 12.3 million in 2016 to 11.6 million in 2026, a decline of 736,000 employees over a decade. As a share of employment, manufacturing was estimated to fall from 7.9% of the total U.S. economy in 2016 to 6.9% of it in 2026, continuing a long-term downward trend.

The U.S. manufacturing industry employed 12.4 million people in March 2017, generating output (nominal GDP) of $2.2 trillion in Q3 2016, with real GDP of $1.9 trillion in 2009 dollars. The share of persons employed in manufacturing relative to total employment has steadily declined since the 1960s. Employment growth in industries such as construction, finance, insurance and real estate, and services industries played a significant role in reducing manufacturing's overall share of U.S. employment. In 1990, services surpassed manufacturing as the largest contributor to overall private industry production, and then the finance, insurance and real estate sector surpassed manufacturing in 1991.

Since the entry of China into the World Trade Organization in December 2001, the decline in manufacturing jobs has accelerated. The U.S. goods trade deficit (imports greater than exports) with China was approximately $350 billion in 2016. However it is possible that the import of goods from China is a result rather than a cause. The US stock market also ended a sustained fourteen year bubble in 2001, and the ensuing job loss pushed a significant portion of US population below the poverty line.

The Economist reported in January 2017 that manufacturing historically created good paying jobs for workers without a college education, particularly for men. The jobs paid well enough so that women did not have to work when they had young children. Unions were strong and owners did not want to risk strikes in their factories due to large capital investments and significant on the job training. Such jobs are much less available in the post-2001 era in the U.S. though they remain available in Germany, Switzerland and Japan, leading to calls to bring those jobs back from overseas, establish protectionism, and reduce immigration. Making it illegal for companies to purchase shares of their own stock has not yet gained traction as a remedy for the diversion of operating profits away from reinvestment in equipment and people. Manufacturing continues to evolve, due to factors such as information technology, supply chain innovations such as containerization, companies un-bundling tasks that used to be in one location or business, reduced barriers to trade, and competition from low-cost developing countries such as China and Mexico. Competition from high wage nations such as Germany is also increasing.

=== History ===
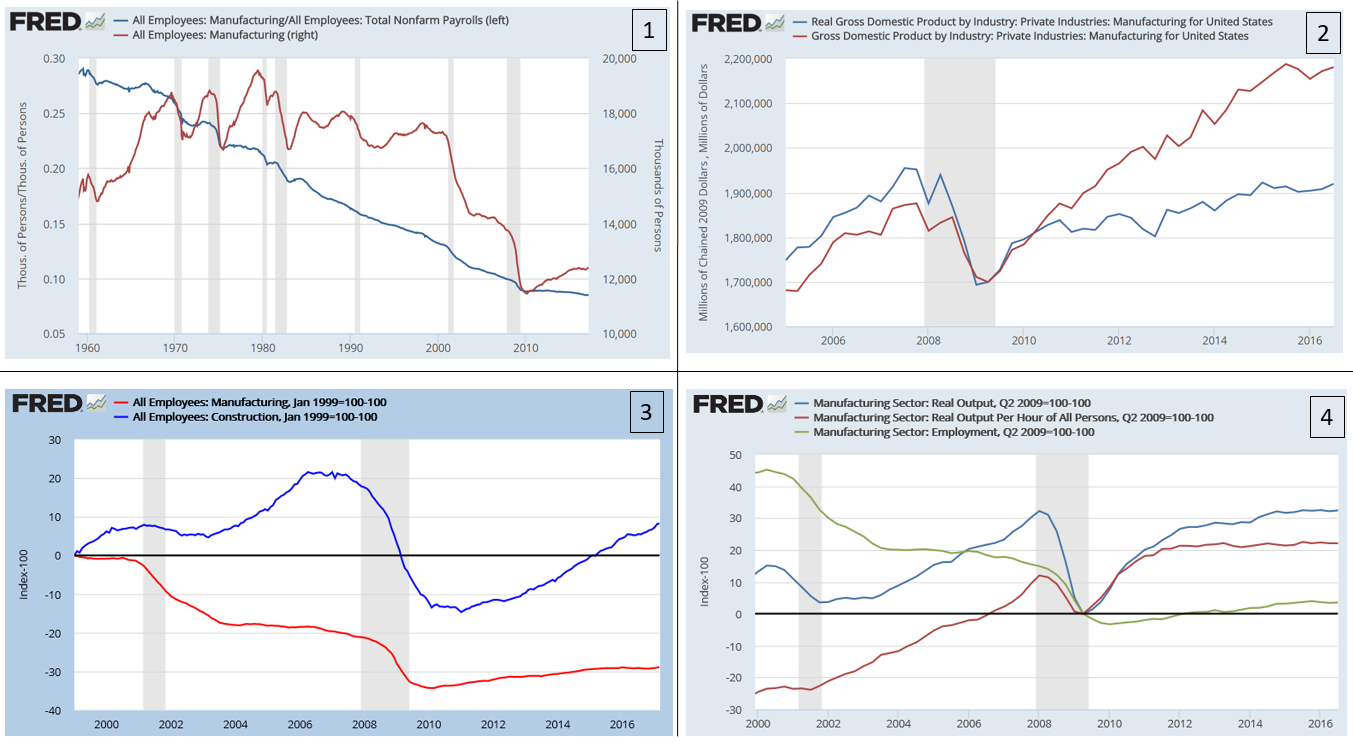
Panel showing four manufacturing charts, illustrating trends in employment, output, and productivity

Between 1980 and 1985, U.S. manufacturing was impacted negatively as Japanese productivity rose at a rapid rate, leading to a fall of 12% in Japanese products, and the increase in U.S. interest rates that led to the appreciation of the U.S. dollar. This was the opposite policy from that which a rise in Japanese productivity would have dictated, and the US policy action made Japanese products 30% cheaper than American until 1986. The US machine tool sector never recovered from this body blow. Between 1983 and 2005, U.S. exports grew by 340%, with exports of manufactured goods increasing by 407% over this period.

In 1983, the primary export commodities of the U.S. was transportation equipment, computer and electronic products, agricultural products, machinery (except electrical), chemicals, and food and kindred products. Together these commodities totaled 69 percent of total U.S. exports. By 2005, the primary export commodities were largely the same: computer and electronic products, transportation equipment, chemicals, machinery (except electrical), miscellaneous manufactured commodities, and agricultural products. Together these commodities accounted for 69 percent of total U.S. merchandise exports.

Between 1983 and 2005, exports of computer and electronic products grew by 493%, overtaking transportation as the leading export commodity, which grew by 410%. Though agricultural products exports grew by 26% during this period, its share of overall merchandise exports fell from 12% in 1983 to 4% in 2005.

In 1983, the top trading partners for U.S. exports were Canada (21% of total merchandise exports), Japan (11%), United Kingdom (5%), Mexico (4%), Germany (4%), the Netherlands (4%), Saudi Arabia (3%), France (3%), South Korea (3%), and Belgium and Luxembourg (2%).

In 2005, the top markets for U.S. exports were Canada (24%), Mexico (13%), Japan (6%), China (5%), United Kingdom (4%), Germany (4%), South Korea (3%), the Netherlands (3%), France (2%), and Taiwan (2%). Between 1983 and 2005, exports to Mexico increased by 1,228%, allowing it to replace Japan as the second-largest market for U.S. exports.

In the first quarter of 2010, overall U.S. merchandise exports increased by 20 percent compared to the first quarter of 2009, with manufactured goods exports increasing by 20 percent. As in 2009, the highest export commodities were transportation equipment, computer and electronic products, chemicals, machinery (except electrical), agricultural products, and miscellaneous manufactured commodities.

In the first quarter of 2010, the primary markets for U.S. merchandise exports were Canada, Mexico, China, Japan, the United Kingdom, Germany, South Korea, Brazil, the Netherlands, and Singapore. With the exception of the Netherlands, exports to all of these countries increased in the first quarter of 2010, compared to the same quarter in 2009. Notably, exports to Canada increased by 22 percent, Mexico by 28 percent, and China by 47 percent over this period. Exports to the two NAFTA partners accounted for nearly one-third (32%) of U.S. merchandise trade in the first quarter of 2010.

The panel chart in this section includes four diagrams describing manufacturing labor, output, and productivity historical trends through 2016:

- Figure 1-Job measures: The blue line (left axis) is the ratio of manufacturing jobs to the total number of non-farm payroll jobs. It has declined since the 1960s as manufacturing jobs fell and services expanded. The red line (right axis) is the number of manufacturing jobs (000s), which had fallen by nearly one-third since the late 1990s.
- Figure 2-Output measures: Real (inflation adjusted) GDP (blue line) and nominal GDP (red line) from the manufacturing sector. While both rose from the trough due to the Great Recession, the real GDP had yet to regain its pre-crisis (2007) level as of 2016.
- Figure 3-Job measures, indexed: The red line shows the percent change in manufacturing jobs, measured relative to the 1999 as the starting point. The blue line shows construction jobs. Both were below pre-crisis levels in 2016.
- Figure 4-Productivity measures, indexed: Measured from the end of the recession (June 2009), employment (green line) is up about 5%, but real output is up over 30%, indicating a significant gain in productivity (i.e., output per labor hour).

=== Forecast ===
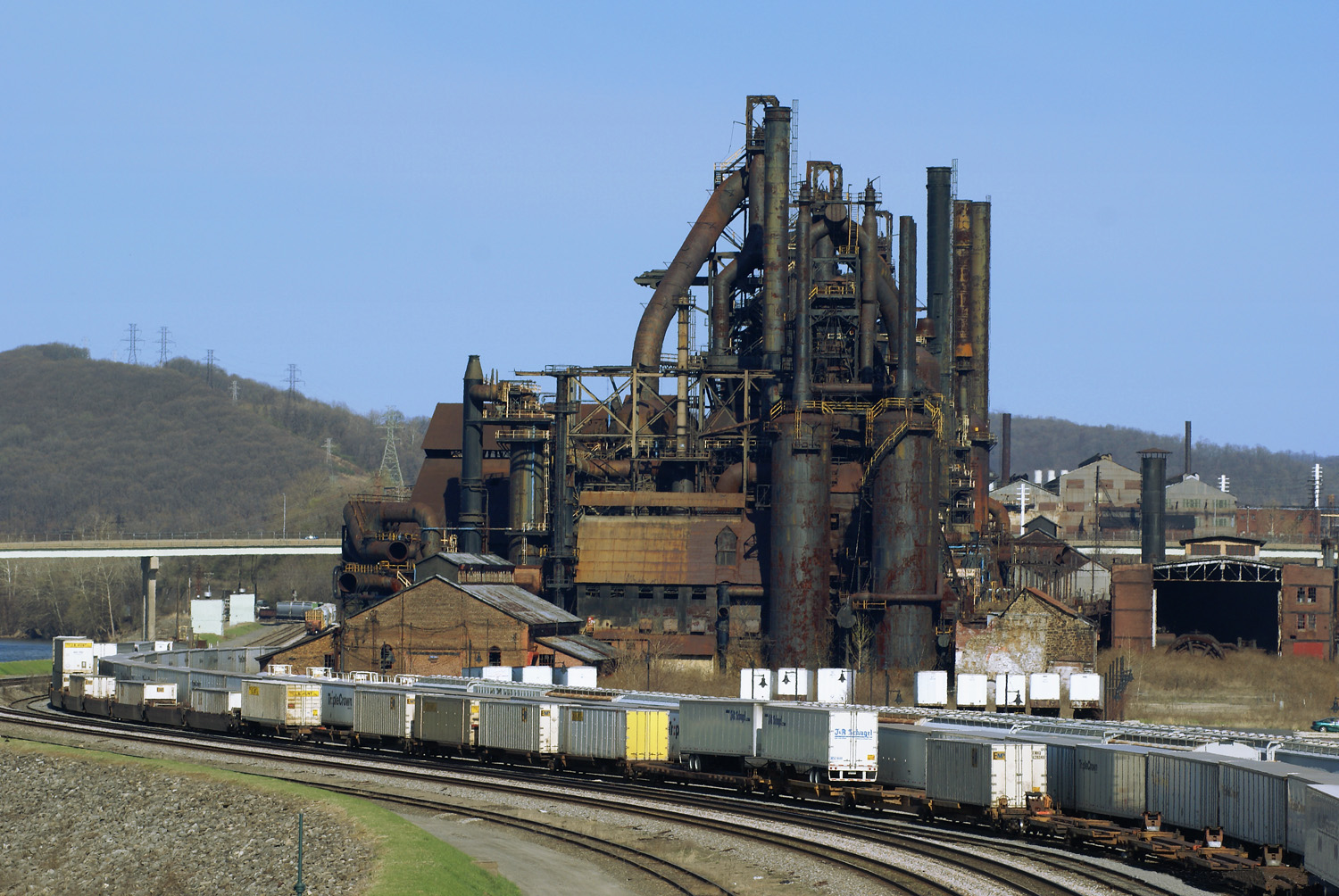
Bethlehem Steel in Bethlehem, Pennsylvania was one of the world's leading steel manufacturers for most of the 20th century. But in 1982, it discontinued most of its operations, declared bankruptcy in 2001, and was dissolved in 2003.

In May 2026, the Bureau of Labor Statistics reported that more than 12.8 million workers were employed in manufacturing in 2024 and projected that overall manufacturing employment would change little from 2024 to 2034. About half of detailed manufacturing industries were projected to add jobs during that decade. Other electrical equipment and component manufacturing, which includes battery manufacturing, was projected to grow fastest and to add about 48,400 jobs, the largest numerical increase among manufacturing industries.

- According to the Semiconductor Industries Association, by the end of 2022, the chip industry has committed almost $200 billion to build and expand 40 plants in 16 states, creating 40,000 future jobs. According to the Natural Resources Defense Council, a similar amount has been promised to US factories making electric cars and batteries.

=== Trade policy ===
U.S. manufacturing employment has declined steadily as a share of total employment, from around 28% in 1960 to 8% in March 2017. Manufacturing employment has fallen from 17.2 million persons in December 2000 to 12.4 million in March 2017, a decline of about 5.7 million or about one-third even as the U.S.population ballooned from 220 million to 330 million in the same time frame. An estimated 1–2 million of the job losses in manufacturing 1999–2011 were due to competition with China (the China shock), which entered the World Trade Organization in December 2001. The Economic Policy Institute estimated that the trade deficit with China cost about 2.7 million jobs between 2001 and 2011, including manufacturing and other industries.

While U.S. manufacturing employment is down, output was near a record level in 2017 in real GDP terms, indicating productivity (output per worker) has also improved significantly. This is likely due to automation, global supply chains, process improvements, and other technology changes.

Economist Paul Krugman argued in December 2016 that "America's shift away from manufacturing doesn't have much to do with trade, and even less to do with trade policy." He also cited the work of other economists indicating that the declines in manufacturing employment from 1999 to 2011 due to trade policy generally and trade with China specifically were "less than a fifth of the absolute loss of manufacturing jobs over the period" but that the effects were significant for regions directly impacted by those losses.

The Biden administration's 2023 Trade Policy Agenda focused on strengthening domestic industries and minimizing reliance on foreign supply chains. The CHIPS and Science Act allocated nearly $53 billion to support semiconductor manufacturing in the U.S. The U.S. Department of Commerce proposed for 16 new semiconductor manufacturing facilities, which would shift the U.S. into a position of resiliency against foreign manufacturers.

== Modern overview ==
The United States is the world's second largest manufacturer (after China) with a record high real output in Q1 2018 of $2.00 trillion (i.e., adjusted for inflation in 2009 Dollars) about one percent above the 2007 peak before the Great Recession of $1.95 trillion. The U.S. manufacturing industry employed 12.35 million people in December 2016 and 12.56 million in December 2017, an increase of 207,000 or 1.7%.

Historically, manufacturing has provided relatively well-paid blue-collar jobs, although this has been affected by globalization and automation.

Manufacturing continues to evolve, due to factors such as information technology, supply chain innovations such as containerization, companies un-bundling tasks that used to be in one location or business, reduced barriers to trade, and competition from low-cost developing countries such as China and Mexico.

Manufacturing is conducted among globally distributed supply chains, with various stages of production conducted in different countries. For example, automotive parts may be manufactured in the U.S., shipped to Mexico for assembly, then sent back to the U.S. In some cases, the components of the final product cross the border multiple times. An estimated 40% of the value of U.S. imports from Mexico is from content produced in the U.S.; this figure is 25% for Canada but only 4% for China. This "production sharing" is an indication of the integrated nature of the supply chains between the U.S., Mexico and Canada in the NAFTA region.

=== Trade balance ===
During 2016, the U.S. exported $1,051 billion in manufactured goods and imported $1,920 billion, a manufacturing goods deficit of $868 billion. The largest exports were transportation equipment ($252B), Chemicals ($174B), Computers and Electronic Products ($116B) and "Machinery-Except Electrical" ($109B).

=== Industries ===
As of 2019, durable and nondurable goods manufacturing account for $3.1t and $3t of gross output of GDP, respectively.

However, 2023 research from McKinsey states that GDP numbers don't accurately capture manufacturing's economic impact. In its findings, while manufacturing accounted for 11 percent of US GDP and 8 percent of direct employment, it drove 20 percent of capital investment, 30 percent of productivity growth, 60 percent of the country's exports, and garnered 70 percent of business research and development funding.

=== Largest manufacturing plants ===
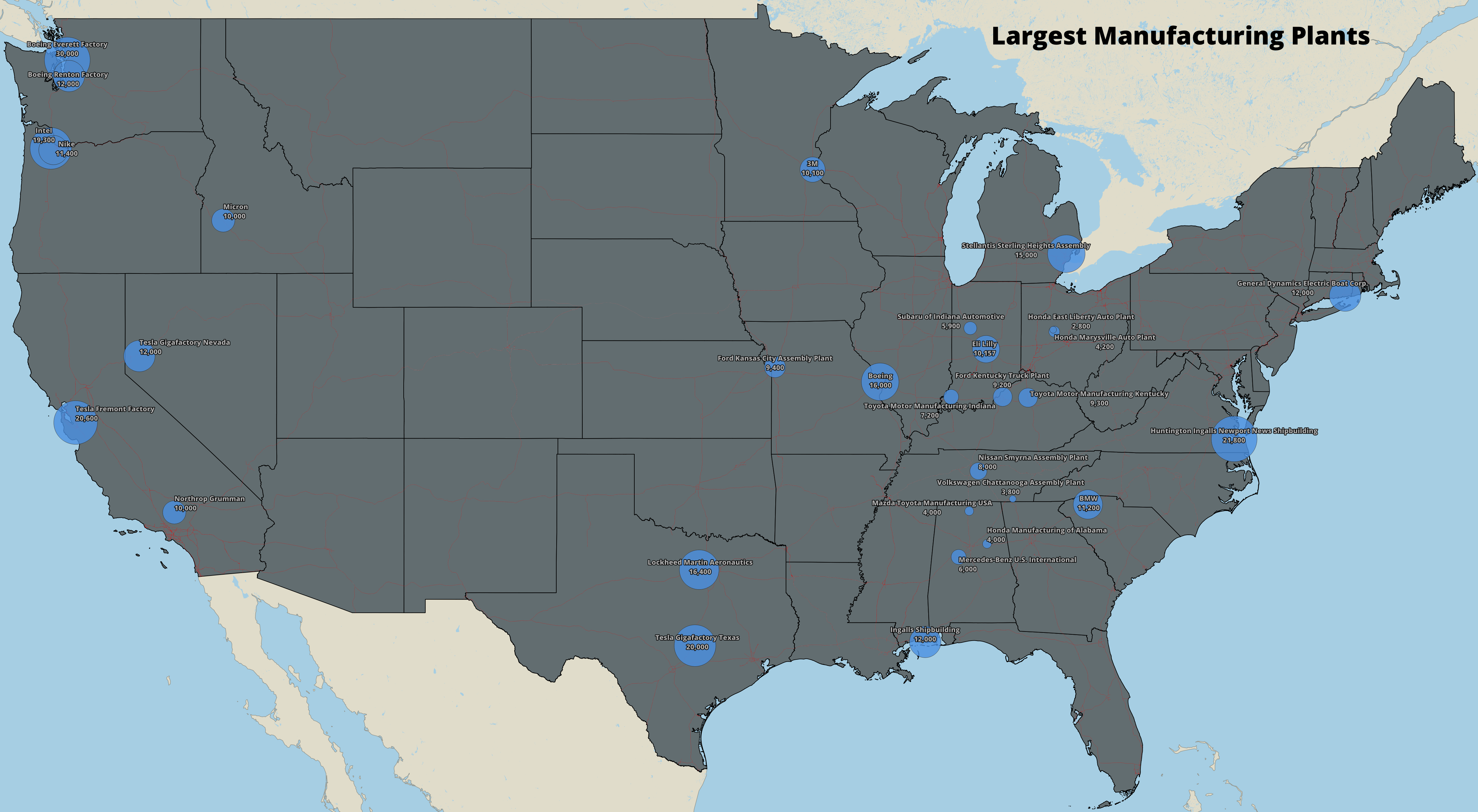
Largest manufacturing plants in the US

Company	Location	Coordinates	Employees
Boeing Everett Factory	Everett, Washington	Google Maps	30,000
Huntington Ingalls Newport News Shipbuilding	Newport News, Virginia	Google Maps	21,800
Tesla Fremont Factory	Fremont, California	Google Maps	20,600
Tesla Gigafactory Texas	Austin, Texas	Google Maps	20,000
Intel	Hillsboro, Oregon	Google Maps	19,300
Lockheed Martin Aeronautics	Fort Worth, Texas	Google Maps	16,400
Boeing	St. Louis, Missouri	Google Maps	16,000
Stellantis Sterling Heights Assembly	Sterling Heights, Michigan	Google Maps	15,000
General Dynamics Electric Boat Corp.	Groton, Connecticut	Google Maps	12,000
Ingalls Shipbuilding	Pascagoula, Mississippi	Google Maps	12,000
Tesla Gigafactory Nevada	Sparks, Nevada	Google Maps	12,000
Boeing Renton Factory	Renton, Washington	Google Maps	12,000
Nike	Beaverton, Oregon	Google Maps	11,400
BMW	Greer, South Carolina	Google Maps	11,200
Eli Lilly	Indianapolis, Indiana	Google Maps	10,157
3M	St. Paul, Minnesota	Google Maps	10,100
Micron	Boise, Idaho	Google Maps	10,000
Northrop Grumman	Palmdale, California	Google Maps	10,000
Ford Kansas City Assembly Plant	Claycomo, Missouri	Google Maps	9,400
Toyota Motor Manufacturing Kentucky	Georgetown, Kentucky	Google Maps	9,300
Ford Kentucky Truck Plant	Louisville, Kentucky	Google Maps	9,200
Nissan Smyrna Assembly Plant	Smyrna, Tennessee	Google Maps	8,000
Toyota Motor Manufacturing Indiana	Princeton, Indiana	Google Maps	7,200
Mercedes-Benz U.S. International	Vance, Alabama	Google Maps	6,000
Subaru of Indiana Automotive	Lafayette, Indiana	Google Maps	5,900
Honda Marysville Auto Plant	Marysville, Ohio	Google Maps	4,200
Honda Manufacturing of Alabama	Lincoln, Alabama	Google Maps	4,000
Mazda Toyota Manufacturing USA	Madison, Alabama	Google Maps	4,000
Volkswagen Chattanooga Assembly Plant	Chattanooga, Tennessee	Google Maps	3,800
Honda East Liberty Auto Plant	East Liberty, Ohio	Google Maps	2,800

== International comparison ==
The Congressional Research Service reported in January 2017 that:

- "The United States' share of global manufacturing activity declined from 28% in 2002, following the end of the 2001 U.S. recession, to 16.5% in 2011. Since then, the U.S. share has risen to 18.6%, the largest share since 2009. These estimates are based on the value of each country's manufacturing in U.S. dollars; part of the decline in the U.S. share was due to a 23% decline in the value of the dollar between 2002 and 2011, and part of the rise since 2011 is attributable to a stronger dollar.
- China displaced the United States as the largest manufacturing country in 2010. Again, part of China's rise by this measure has been due to the appreciation of its currency, the renminbi, against the U.S. dollar. The reported size of China's manufacturing sector decreased slightly in 2015 due to currency adjustments.
- Manufacturing output, measured in each country's local currency adjusted for inflation, has been growing more slowly in the United States than in China, South Korea, Germany, and Mexico, but more rapidly than in most European countries and Canada.
- Employment in manufacturing has fallen in most major manufacturing countries over the past quarter-century. In the United States, manufacturing employment since 1990 has declined in line with the changes in Western Europe and Japan, although the timing of the decline has differed from country to country.
- U.S. manufacturers spend far more on research and development (R&D) than those in any other country, but manufacturers' R&D spending is rising more rapidly in several other countries.
- Manufacturers in many countries appear to be spending increasing amounts on R&D, relative to their value added. U.S. manufacturers spend approximately 11% of value added on R&D, an increase of more than three percentage points since 2002. A large proportion of U.S. manufacturers' R&D takes place in high technology sectors, such as pharmaceutical, electronics, and aircraft manufacturing, whereas in most other countries the largest share of R&D occurs in medium-technology sectors such as automotive and machinery manufacturing."

== See also ==
- Economy of the United States
- National Network for Manufacturing Innovation
- National Occupational Research Agenda, Manufacturing Sector Council, 2018.
- U.S. Chamber of Commerce
- Working: People Talk About What They Do All Day and How They Feel About What They Do – American workers on their jobs in the 1970s
- Made in USA
- Qualified Production Activities Income
- Foreign Sales Corporation - allowed companies to receive a reduction in U.S. federal income tax for profits derived from exports
