= Domestic international sales corporation =

The domestic international sales corporation is a concept unique to tax law in the United States. In 1971, the U.S. Congress voted to use U.S. tax law to subsidize exports of U.S.-made goods. The initial mechanism was through a Domestic International Sales Corporation (DISC), an entity with no substance which received tax benefits. Today, shareholders of a DISC continue to receive reduced income tax rates on qualifying income from exports of U.S.-made goods.

A DISC is a U.S. corporation that has elected DISC status and meets certain other largely symbolic requirements. A corporation so electing is not subject to U.S. Federal income tax. Properly structured, a DISC has no activities other than on paper and no activities not related to the export of qualifying goods.

Mechanism for benefit: A DISC contracts with a producer or reseller of U.S.-made goods or provider of certain qualifying construction-related services to provide "services" to such related supplier for a fee. The fee is determined under formulas and rules defined in the law and regulations. Under these regulations, the fee is deductible by the related supplier and results in a specified net profit to the DISC. This net profit is not subject to Federal income tax. The DISC then distributes the profit to its shareholders, who are taxable on the income as a qualified dividend. If the shareholders are U.S. resident individuals or others eligible for the reduced rate of tax (now between 0% and 20%, depending on ordinary income level) on qualified dividends, then the tax rate on the income allocated to the DISC is reduced.

The pricing rules in the law and regulation are independent of the transfer pricing rules normally applicable to transactions between related parties. Thus, DISC profits are not dependent on the economic contribution of the DISC, and a DISC need have no substance.

Because a DISC has no substance, implementation and maintenance is fairly easy. Complexities can arise, however, in making calculations of the permitted DISC income due to rules designed to help maximize the subsidy. These rules include a "no loss" rule, overall profit percentage, grouping, marginal costing and other techniques, use of which may be improved by software tools.

Additional substantial rules apply.

The use of DISCs was challenged by the European Community under the GATT. The United States counterclaimed that European tax regulations concerning extraterritorial income were also GATT-incompatible. In 1976, a GATT panel found that both DISCs and the European tax regulations were GATT-incompatible. These cases were settled, however, by the Tokyo Round Code on Subsidies and Countervailing Duties (predecessor to today's SCM), and the GATT Council decided in 1981 to adopt the panel reports subject to the understanding that the terms of the settlement would apply. The WTO Panel in the 1999 case later ruled that the 1981 decision did not constitute a legal instrument within the meaning of GATT-1994, and hence was not binding on the panel. The Foreign Sales Corporation (FSC) was created in 1984 as an alternative to the DISC. In 1984, partially in response to international pressure, U.S. law was amended to provide that a DISC and its shareholders could continue to defer tax on the DISC’s income, but only if the DISC shareholders paid interest on the deferred tax.

== History ==
In discussing the history of domestic international sales corporations as well as how domestic international sales corporations relate to foreign sale corporations, the U.S. Court of Federal Claims, in Ford Motor Co. v. United States, 132 Fed.Cl. 104, 110 (2017), stated:

In 1971, Congress “provided special tax treatment for export sales made by an American manufacturer through a subsidiary that qualified as a ‘domestic international sales corporation’ (DISC).” ...That authority was largely replaced by provisions regarding foreign sales corporations (“FSC”), ... as set forth in the Deficit Reduction Act of 1984, ... A qualifying FSC presented tax advantages for its parent company within the United States because a portion of the FSC’s export income was exempt from taxation. ... The parent company of a FSC could use those tax benefits by selling its products to the FSC for resale in foreign markets, or by paying the FSC a commission for selling the parent’s products in foreign markets. ... The remaining foreign trade income that was not exempt from taxation, when distributed to a parent company as a dividend, would generally not be subject to an additional tax on that distribution. ... “The net effect of this scheme was to shift a prescribed amount of profit on export sales from an entity with a 35 percent effective tax rate to an entity (the FSC) with an effective tax rate of approximately 12 percent.”

== See also ==
- Foreign Sales Corporation
- Extraterritorial income exclusion
- List of international trade topics
