= Foreign Sales Corporation =

Foreign Sales Corporation (FSC) was a type of tax device allowed under the United States Internal Revenue Code that allowed companies to receive a reduction in U.S. federal income tax for profits derived from exports. It was enacted to encourage US companies to export following concerns over US trade deficit. It exempts a portion of the export of US manufactured goods and certain services from tax.

The FSC was created in 1984 to replace the old export-promoting tax scheme, the Domestic International Sales Corporation, or DISC. An international dispute arose in 1971, when the United States introduced legislation providing for DISCs. These laws were challenged by the European Community under the GATT. The United States then counterclaimed that European tax regulations concerning extraterritorial income were also GATT-incompatible. In 1976, a GATT panel found that both DISCs and the European tax regulations were GATT-incompatible. These cases were settled, however, by the Tokyo Round Code on Subsidies and Countervailing Duties, predecessor to today's Subsidies and Countervailing Measures (SCM), and the GATT Council decided in 1981 to adopt the panel reports subject to the understanding that the terms of the settlement would apply. The WTO Panel in the 1999 case later ruled that the 1981 decision did not constitute a legal instrument within the meaning of GATT-1994, and hence was not binding on the panel.

The European Union (EU) launched legal proceedings against the U.S. law in the World Trade Organization (WTO) in 1999, claiming the U.S. law allowed an export subsidy. In March 2000, the Appellate Body of the WTO found that the FSC provisions of U.S. law constituted a prohibited export subsidy under the General Agreement on Tariffs and Trade (GATT) Uruguay Round code on Subsidies and Countervailing Measures. In 2000, the U.S. Congress enacted the FSC Repeal and Extraterritorial Income Exclusion Act of 2000, (ETI) repealing sections 921 through 927 of the Internal Revenue Code dealing with FSCs. The Act included new laws, however, to exclude extraterritorial income from taxation (the Extraterritorial income exclusion).

The European Union (EU) challenged ETI in 2001, claiming the new law did not properly implement the earlier WTO decision. The EU argued that the ETI effectively retained the export subsidy, albeit under a different name. The WTO found the ETI to be a prohibited export subsidy. The United States did not meet the deadline to implement this decision and, on 30 August 30, 2002, the WTO approved the European Union request for over US$4 billion in retaliatory tariffs. Most observers viewed it as unlikely that the European Union would implement the sanctions, since the disruption that would be caused to transatlantic trade would rebound on European companies; it is likely rather than the EU will seek to use the threat of sanctions as a bargaining chip to obtain concessions from the US in other areas.

In Ford Motor Co. v. United States, 132 Fed.Cl. 104, 110 (2017), the U.S. Court of Federal Claims stated:

In 1971, Congress “provided special tax treatment for export sales made by an American manufacturer through a subsidiary that qualified as a ‘domestic international sales corporation’ (DISC).” Boeing Co. v. United States, 537 U.S. 437, 440 (2003) (footnote omitted). That authority was largely replaced by provisions regarding foreign sales corporations (“FSC”), id. at 442, as set forth in the Deficit Reduction Act of 1984, Pub. L. No. 98-369, Title VIII, § 801(a), 98 Stat. 494, 985 (codified at I.R.C. §§ 921-27, repealed by the FSC Repeal and Extraterritorial Income Exclusion Act of 2000, Pub. L. No. 106-519, § 2, 114 Stat. 2423). A qualifying FSC presented tax advantages for its parent company within the United States because a portion of the FSC’s export income was exempt from taxation. See Staff of S. Comm. on Finance, Deficit Reduction Act of 1984, Explanation of Provisions Approved by the Committee on March 21, 1984, S. Print No. 98-169, Vol. I, at 636; see also I.R.C. §§ 921(a), 923 (specifying the particular portion of a FSC’s foreign trade income that would be excluded from gross income). The parent company of a FSC could use those tax benefits by selling its products to the FSC for resale in foreign markets, or by paying the FSC a commission for selling the parent’s products in foreign markets. See I.R.C. §§ 925(a), (b)(1); Abbott Labs. v. United States, 84 Fed. Cl. 96, 102 (2008) (detailing the FSC scheme), aff’d, 573 F.3d 1327 (Fed. Cir. 2009). The remaining foreign trade income that was not exempt from taxation, when distributed to a parent company as a dividend, would generally not be subject to an additional tax on that distribution. See I.R.C. § 245(c)(1)(A). “The net effect of this scheme was to shift a prescribed amount of profit on export sales from an entity with a 35 percent effective tax rate to an entity (the FSC) with an effective tax rate of approximately 12 percent.” Abbott Labs., 84 Fed. Cl. at 100 (citing Staff of Joint Comm. on Taxation, 98th Congress, General Explanation of the Revenue Provisions of the Deficit Reduction Act of 1984 (Comm. Print 1984), at 1045).

== See also ==
- Extraterritorial income exclusion
- Domestic international sales corporation
- List of international trade topics
