= Quarterly Publication of Individuals Who Have Chosen to Expatriate =

American government publication

The Quarterly Publication of Individuals Who Have Chosen to Expatriate, also known as the Quarterly Publication of Individuals, Who Have Chosen to Expatriate, as Required by Section 6039G, is a publication of the United States Internal Revenue Service (IRS) in the Federal Register, listing the names of certain individuals with respect to whom the IRS has received information regarding loss of citizenship during the preceding quarter.

== Overview ==
The practice of publishing the names of ex-citizens is not unique to the United States. South Korea's Ministry of Justice, for example, also publishes the names of people losing South Korean nationality in the government gazette. Prior to the 1990s, however, loss of United States citizenship was not a matter of public record; the State Department considered that routine disclosure of the names of people giving up U.S. citizenship might violate the Privacy Act of 1974 and other laws.

The United States government first released a list of former U.S. citizens in a State Department letter to Congress made public by a 1995 Joint Committee on Taxation report. That report contained the names of 978 people who had relinquished U.S. citizenship between January 1, 1994 and April 25, 1995. This action was in the larger context of widespread media attention to the issue of wealthy individuals who gave up citizenship to avoid United States taxes. As a result, several legislators proposed bills or amendments to end the confidentiality surrounding loss of citizenship, and to publish the names of ex-citizens. The one that eventually passed was an amendment by Sam Gibbons (D-FL) to the Health Insurance Portability and Accountability Act of 1996. That amendment added new provisions to the Internal Revenue Code (now at 26 U.S.C. § 6039G) to require that the Treasury Department publish the names of persons relinquishing U.S. citizenship within thirty days after the end of each calendar quarter. Publication began in 1996; lists published in 1997 included the names of people losing citizenship after 1995. The list includes only the names of former citizens, not their reasons for giving up citizenship or other information about them. Lawyers familiar with the process state that it takes roughly six months after people give up citizenship for their names to appear in the list.

Congress' motive for requiring this publication may have been to "shame or embarrass" people who give up U.S. citizenship for tax reasons. However, Michael S. Kirsch of Notre Dame Law School questions the effectiveness of this, given that it may result in the shaming of people who give up U.S. citizenship for other reasons, while having little effect on or even acting as a badge of honor for wealthy individuals who are "particularly individualistic and unconcerned with how they may be perceived by the general population." Gibbons expected that the list would include only "a handful of the wealthiest of the wealthy" motivated solely by taxes; however, the people named in the list turned out to have a wide variety of motivations for emigrating from the U.S. and later giving up citizenship, and few were publicly known to be wealthy. As a Wall Street Journal article described the political environment of the mid-1990s which led to the creation of the list: "Congress got mad at legal aliens who use social services but don't become U.S. citizens. Less noisily, it got mad at Americans who become legal aliens in other countries, use services there, but decide not to remain U.S. citizens for life."

== Criteria for inclusion in list ==
Comparisons with other sources of data on ex-citizens suggest that the lists of ex-citizens published in the Federal Register may not necessarily include all ex-citizens. Media reports from authors who believe that the IRS list is supposed to include all expatriates have suggested this means the Federal Register expatriate list has been "lowballing its numbers." Other sources advance a variety of explanations.

=== Non-covered expatriates ===
There are differences of opinion among lawyers over whether 26 U.S.C. § 6039G mandates that the names of only some or all former citizens must appear in the Quarterly Publication. One opinion is that only those who are subject to the expatriation tax (so-called "covered expatriates") appear in the list. (Under current law, 26 U.S.C. § 877(a)(2), "covered expatriates" are those with more than $2,000,000 in assets, an average of $124,000—adjusted for inflation—in taxes owed or paid over the preceding five years, or who are unable to certify under penalty of perjury that they have complied with all tax form filing and payment obligations in the preceding five years.) Those with this opinion include David Lesperance and John Gaver. In contrast, Andrew Mitchel, a Connecticut tax lawyer interviewed by The Wall Street Journal for its reports on Americans giving up citizenship, states that the list is required to include all former citizens. Michael Kirsch also states that the list is required to include all former citizens, not just those deemed by Section 877 to be giving up citizenship for tax reasons.

Under 26 U.S.C. § 877 (the old expatriation tax statute) as in effect from the 1996 passage of HIPAA until the American Jobs Creation Act of 2004, expatriation tax was imposed only if the IRS determined that "one of the principal purposes" of a U.S. person's abandonment of citizenship or permanent residence status was avoidance of taxation. Nevertheless, according to a 2000 Congressional Research Service memorandum, the IRS did not at that time make the determination of principal purposes before including a person's name in the Quarterly Publication, and so stated that "these lists include expatriates whose motivation may not have been tax avoidance".

Robert Wood of Wood LLP in San Francisco, writing in Forbes, states that the Quarterly Publication does not include "[w]hat is often called consular expatriations, where people don’t file exit tax forms with the IRS". The American Bar Association's Taxation Section believes 26 U.S.C. § 6039G should be read not to require persons whose loss of citizenship occurred before the passage of the American Jobs Creation Act of 2004 to file the exit tax form (Form 8854), and has urged the issuance of Treasury regulations clarifying this interpretation.

=== Non-citizen former permanent residents ===
The Quarterly Publication may be required to include the names not just of former U.S. citizens but of certain former permanent residents ("ex-green card holders") as well. Under 26 U.S.C. § 6039G(d)(3), "the Federal agency primarily responsible for administering the immigration laws shall provide to the Secretary the name of each lawful permanent resident of the United States (within the meaning of section 7701 (b)(6)) whose status as such has been revoked or has been administratively or judicially determined to have been abandoned." The Quarterly Publication includes a statement that "for purposes of this listing, long-term residents, as defined in section 877(e)(2), are treated as if they were citizens of the United States who lost citizenship". Andrew Mitchel, a Connecticut tax lawyer, believes that the law requires the IRS to include former long-term green card holders in the Quarterly Publication, but given the number of names which appear, he finds it unlikely that they are actually included.

In 2000, a Government Accountability Office report noted that while the Immigration and Naturalization Service provided data to the IRS in electronic form identifying individuals who gave up permanent residence status, the data did not fulfill the IRS' needs because it did not generally include Taxpayer Identification Numbers nor contain information on the length of time for which each of the former permanent residents had held his or her status, and thus the IRS could not use the information for tracking people who were subject to the expatriation tax. The tax law definition of abandonment of lawful permanent residence does not include people whose green cards expire; they continue to be subject to federal tax as U.S. residents rather than the expatriation tax, and are not regarded by the IRS as having "expatriated" even though they may no longer possess the right to reside in the United States. According to 26 CFR 301.7701(b)-1, the only way for an individual to initiate the process of administrative determination of abandonment of lawful residence is to file Form I-407. Additionally, a green card holder who takes a tax treaty-based return position as a non-resident of the U.S. also triggers the expatriation tax.

=== Reinsurance companies ===
Three reinsurance companies have been included in the Quarterly Publication: RBC Reinsurance, Ltd. in Q2 2000; ING Re Limited (Ireland) in Q1 2003; and Imagine International Reinsurance Limited in Q2 2003. International tax practitioners were uncertain why companies would appear in the Quarterly Publication, as the expatriation tax provisions and the provisions of 26 U.S.C. § 6039G(d) establishing the list itself all refer to "individual[s]" losing United States citizenship; although the term "individual" is not defined in the Internal Revenue Code, it is unlikely that it could be interpreted to include entities (unlike the term "person", which 26 U.S.C. § 7701(a)(1) explicitly defines to include legal persons). Furthermore, Section 6039G makes no allowance for publication of the names of entities that engage in tax inversions (which are sometimes mistakenly referred to in the popular press as "corporations renouncing their citizenship").

== Comparison with other sources of data on ex-citizens ==
Since 1998, the Federal Bureau of Investigation has also maintained its own list of people who have renounced citizenship under 8 U.S.C. § 1481(a)(5), as this is one of the categories of people prohibited from purchasing firearms under the Gun Control Act of 1968 and who must be entered into the National Instant Criminal Background Check System (NICS) under the Brady Handgun Violence Prevention Act of 1993. The names are not made public, but each month the FBI issues a report on the number of entries added in each category. NICS covers a different population from the Federal Register expatriate list: the former includes only those who renounce U.S. citizenship, while the latter should include those who voluntarily lose citizenship by any means, and possibly certain former permanent residents as well.

In 2012, the FBI added 4,652 records to the NICS "renounced U.S. citizenship" category in 2012, much larger than the number of names published in the Federal Register expatriate lists during the same period. About 2,900 of those were added to NICS in one large batch in October 2012; FBI spokesman Stephen G. Fischer attributed this jump to State Department efforts to clear a backlog of earlier renunciants who had not been provided to the FBI previously. However, in 2013, the number of records of renunciants added to NICS again exceeded the number of names published in the Federal Register expatriate list, with 3,128 renunciants in the former against only 3,000 losing citizenship or permanent residence by any means in the latter.

United States Citizenship and Immigration Services stated, in response to a 2013 Freedom of Information Act request, that an average of 18,196 people per year filed Form I-407 to abandon their LPR status in each of Fiscal Years 2010 through 2012. In 2014 Paperwork Reduction Act filings, USCIS estimated that annually, 9,371 people would file Form I-407 in the following three years. The State Department estimated in 2007 that annually, 2,298 people file Form DS-4079 to relinquish their United States citizenship. Finally, the IRS estimated in 2012 that Notices 97-19 and 98-34, which "provide guidance regarding the federal tax consequences for certain individuals who lose U.S. citizenship" or "cease to be taxed as U.S. lawful permanent residents", apply to 12,350 people annually.

The State Department stated that 1,100 people renounced citizenship at only one particular US consulate post during the first ten months of 2014. There are more than 270 US consular posts. In September 2015, the State Department estimated that there would be 5,986 renunciants and 559 relinquishers during Fiscal Year 2015.

== Statistics ==
Count of names in the Quarterly Publication of Individuals Who Have Chosen to Expatriate
Number of persons whose names were published after the IRS received information on their loss of citizenship during the quarter in question
Data for 1997 are not directly comparable to other years because lists published that year also included the names of people who lost citizenship in 1995 and 1996

"Count of names" refers to the number of entries contained in that quarter's list. This figure may include names which are duplicated in previous lists, as well as erroneous list entries such as a street address in Switzerland which was listed as the name of a person giving up citizenship in the fourth quarter of 2013. "Publication delay" refers to the number of days between the end of the calendar quarter and the day on which the list appeared in the Federal Register. Delays longer than the maximum 30 days required by law are shown in red.

Names from 1996–2002
Year & quarter		Citation	Date	Publication delay (days)	Count of names
1996					
1996	Q4	62 FR 4570	1997‑01‑30	30	90
1997	Q1	62 FR 23532	1997‑04‑30	30	238
1997	Q2	62 FR 39305	1997‑07‑22	22	1,208
1997	Q3	62 FR 59758	1997‑11‑04	35	254
1997	Q4	63 FR 6609	1998‑02‑09	40	116
1998	Q1	64 FR 48894	1999‑09‑08	527	136
1998	Q2	65 FR 15041	2000‑03‑20	629	75
1998	Q3	63 FR 56696	1998‑10‑22	22	151
1998	Q4	64 FR 3339	1999‑01‑21	21	36
1999	Q1	64 FR 19858	1999‑04‑22	22	128
1999	Q2	64 FR 38944	1999‑07‑20	20	107
1999	Q3	64 FR 56837	1999‑10‑21	21	118
1999	Q4	65 FR 5020	2000‑02‑02	33	81
2000	Q1	65 FR 35423	2000‑06‑02	63	185
2000	Q2	65 FR 50050	2000‑08‑16	47	89
2000	Q3	65 FR 80494	2000-12-21	82	88
2000	Q4	66 FR 48913	2001‑09‑24	267	69
2001	Q1	66 FR 48915	2001‑09‑24	177	225
2001	Q2	66 FR 48912	2001‑09‑24	86	190
2001	Q3	67 FR 11375	2002‑03‑13	154	123
2001	Q4	67 FR 11374	2002‑03‑13	103	21
2002	Q1	67 FR 19621	2002‑04‑22	53	109
2002	Q2	67 FR 47889	2002‑07‑22	22	70
2002	Q3	67 FR 66456	2002‑10‑31	31	225
2002	Q4	68 FR 4549	2003‑01‑29	29	99

Names from 2003–2009
Year & quarter		Citation	Date	Publication delay (days)	Count of names
2003	Q1	68 FR 23180	2003‑04‑30	30	114
2003	Q2	68 FR 44840	2003‑07‑30	30	209
2003	Q3	69 FR 61906	2004‑10‑21	386	115
2003	Q4	69 FR 61910	2004‑10‑21	294	133
2004	Q1	69 FR 61907	2004‑10‑21	204	108
2004	Q2	69 FR 61908	2004‑10‑21	113	138
2004	Q3	69 FR 61909	2004‑10‑21	21	443
2004	Q4	70 FR 5511	2005‑02‑02	33	142
2005	Q1	70 FR 23295	2005‑05‑04	34	122
2005	Q2	71 FR 68901	2006‑11‑28	516	416
2005	Q3	70 FR 68511	2005‑11‑10	41	126
2005	Q4	71 FR 6312	2006‑02‑07	38	98
2006	Q1	71 FR 25648	2006‑05‑01	31	100
2006	Q2	71 FR 50993	2006‑08‑28	59	31
2006	Q3	71 FR 63857	2006‑10‑31	31	41
2006	Q4	72 FR 5103	2007‑02‑02	33	106
2007	Q1	72 FR 26687	2007‑05‑10	40	107
2007	Q2	72 FR 44228	2007‑08‑07	38	114
2007	Q3	72 FR 63237	2007‑11‑08	39	105
2007	Q4	73 FR 7631	2008‑02‑08	39	144
2008	Q1	73 FR 26190	2008‑05‑08	38	123
2008	Q2	73 FR 43285	2008‑07‑24	24	23
2008	Q3	73 FR 65036	2008‑10‑31	31	22
2008	Q4	74 FR 6219	2009‑02‑05	36	63
2009	Q1	74 FR 20105	2009‑04‑30	30	67
2009	Q2	74 FR 35911	2009‑07‑21	21	15
2009	Q3	74 FR 60039	2009‑11‑19	50	158
2009	Q4	75 FR 9028	2010‑02‑26	57	503

Names from 2010–2016
Year & quarter		Citation	Date	Publication delay (days)	Count of names
2010	Q1	75 FR 28853	2010‑05‑24	54	179
2010	Q2	75 FR 69160	2010‑11‑10	133	560
2010	Q3	75 FR 69158	2010‑11‑10	41	397
2010	Q4	76 FR 7907	2011‑02‑11	42	398
2011	Q1	76 FR 27175	2011‑05‑10	40	499
2011	Q2	76 FR 46898	2011‑08‑03	34	519
2011	Q3	76 FR 66361	2011‑10‑26	26	403
2011	Q4	77 FR 5308	2012‑02‑02	33	360
2012	Q1	77 FR 25538	2012‑04‑30	30	460
2012	Q2	77 FR 44310	2012‑07‑27	27	189
2012	Q3	77 FR 66084	2012‑11‑01	32	238
2012	Q4	78 FR 10692	2013‑02‑24	45	45
2013	Q1	78 FR 26867	2013‑05‑08	38	679
2013	Q2	78 FR 48773	2013‑08‑09	40	1,130
2013	Q3	78 FR 68151	2013‑11‑13	44	560
2013	Q4	79 FR 7504	2014‑02‑07	38	631
2014	Q1	79 FR 25176	2014‑05‑02	32	1,001
2014	Q2	79 FR 46306	2014‑08‑07	38	576
2014	Q3	79 FR 64031	2014‑10‑27	27	776
2014	Q4	80 FR 7685	2015‑02‑11	42	1,062
2015	Q1	80 FR 26618	2015‑05‑08	38	1,335
2015	Q2	80 FR 45709	2015-07-31	31	460
2015	Q3	80 FR 65851	2015-10-27	27	1,426
2015	Q4	81 FR 6598	2016-02-08	39	1,058
2016	Q1	81 FR 27198	2016-05-05	35	1,158
2016	Q2	81 FR 50058	2016-07-29	29	509
2016	Q3	81 FR 79098	2016-11-10	41	1,379
2016	Q4	82 FR 10185	2017-02-09	40	2,364

Names from 2017–2023
Year & quarter		Citation	Date	Publication delay (days)	Count of names
2017	Q1	82 FR 21877	2017‑05‑10	40	1,313
2017	Q2	82 FR 36188	2017-08-03	34	1,758
2017	Q3	82 FR 50960	2017-11-02	33	1,376
2017	Q4	83 FR 5830	2018-02-09	40	685
2018	Q1	83 FR 20914	2018-05-08	38	1,099
2018	Q2	83 FR 37616	2018-08-01	32	1,086
2018	Q3	83 FR 58321	2018-11-19	50	1,104
2018	Q4	84 FR 9204	2019-03-13	72	685
2019	Q1	84 FR 20954	2019-05-13	43	1,018
2019	Q2	84 FR 41807	2019-08-15	46	609
2019	Q3	84 FR 61137	2019-11-12	43	183
2019	Q4	85 FR 7847	2020-02-11	42	261
2020	Q1	85 FR 27507	2020-05-08	38	2,907
2020	Q2	85 FR 47843	2020-08-06	37	2,406
2020	Q3	85 FR 68625	2020-10-29	29	732
2020	Q4	86 FR 8251	2021-02-04	35	660
2021	Q1	86 FR 22781	2021-04-29	29	228
2021	Q2	86 FR 40899	2021-07-29	29	733
2021	Q3	86 FR 63091	2021-11-15	46	977
2021	Q4	87 FR 4106	2022-01-26	26	488
2022	Q1	87 FR 24639	2022-04-26	26	568
2022	Q2	87 FR 45403	2022-07-28	28	1,474
2022	Q3	87 FR 64842	2022-10-26	26	750
2022	Q4	88 FR 5418	2023-01-27	27	1,024
2023	Q1	88 FR 24270	2023-04-19	19	536
2023	Q2	88 FR 47238	2023-07-21	21	830
2023	Q3	88 FR 74232	2023-10-30	30	749
2023	Q4	89 FR 5606	2024-01-29	29	1,145

Names since 2024
Year & quarter		Citation	Date	Publication delay (days)	Count of names
2024	Q1	89 FR 34331	2024-04-30	30	345
2024	Q2	89 FR 62843	2024-08-01	32	1,717
2024	Q3	89 FR 86083	2024-10-29	29	2,123
2024	Q4	90 FR 8830	2025-02-03	34	635
2025	Q1	90 FR 17279	2025-04-24	24	1,285
2025	Q2	90 FR 34719	2025-07-23	23	1,057
2025	Q3	90 FR 51443	2025-11-17	48	1,593
2025	Q4	91 FR 2999	2026-01-23	23	954
2026	Q1	91 FR 21597	2026-04-22	22	1,462
2026	Q2	91 FR 46535	2026-07-23	23	1,781
2026	Q3	91 FR 68602	2026-10-30	30	1,331
2026	Q4				

== Titles ==
Since 2022, the title of the publication has been Quarterly Publication of Individuals, Who Have Chosen To Expatriate. Previously, the title was Quarterly Publication of Individuals, Who Have Chosen To Expatriate, as Required by Section 6039G in every edition except:

Titles of individual publications before 2022
Quarter and year	Title	Notes
Q4 1996	Quarterly Publication of Individuals, Who Have Chosen To Expatriate, as Required by Section 877(a)	Section 877(a) of the Internal Revenue Code does not require this publication.
Q1, Q2, Q4 1997	Quarterly Publication of Individuals, Who Have Chosen To Expatriate, as Required by Section 3069F	There is no section 3069F in the Internal Revenue Code. Probably a misspelling of 6039F, which was renumbered 6039G in August 1997.
Q3 1997	Quarterly Publication of Individuals, Who Have Chosen To Expatriate, as Required by Section 6039(f)	There is no section 6039(f) in the Internal Revenue Code. Probably a misspelling of 6039F, which was renumbered 6039G in August 1997.
Q1 2012, Q1 2013, Q3 2021	Quarterly Publication of Individuals, Who Have Chosen To Expatriate	With comma.
Q4 2021	Quarterly Publication of Individuals, Who Have Chosen to Expatriate	With comma.
Q4 2013	Quarterly Publication of Individuals Who Have Chosen To Expatriate	Without comma.

Before 2022, the publication incorrectly spelled the acronym of the Health Insurance Portability and Accountability Act (HIPAA) as "HIPPA" in all but six editions (Q2 1999, Q1 2008, Q2 2008, Q3 2009, Q4 2011, Q3 2015).

== See also ==
- Relinquishment of United States nationality
