= Corporate exit tax =

Exit taxation, also known as the exit charge, is a payment made for discontinuation of certain economic activities within corporate groups, required in many tax jurisdictions by transfer pricing regulations. Within the European Union, exit taxation is provided for in Article 5 of Directive 2016/1164 of 12 July 2016 "laying down rules against tax avoidance practices that directly affect the functioning of the internal market".

Exit taxation is also referred to as compensation for the "transfer of the place of business", remuneration for taking over functions, assets, risks and contracts with customers, payment for the take-over of part of the business, remuneration for the transfer of production and sales capabilities or transfer of profit potential.

The obligation to pay the exit fee corresponds to the responsibility of the other party to cease a certain type of economic activity and it is often linked to other types of benefits, such as the transfer of ownership of production machines or the transfer of industrial property rights or know-how. However, the fee for these assets is usually calculated separately, so in reality it is a remuneration for the transfer of functions or risks excluding assets.
