= Countervailing duties =

Import tariffs imposed on goods found to be unfairly subsidized by their exporter

Countervailing duties (CVDs), also known as anti-subsidy duties, are trade import duties imposed under World Trade Organization (WTO) rules. They are applied following an investigation that determines a foreign country's subsidies on exports have harmed domestic producers in the importing country. These duties aim to counterbalance the adverse impacts of such subsidies.

According to World Trade Organization rules, a country can launch its own investigation and decide to charge extra duties, provided such additional duties are in accordance with the GATT Article VI and the GATT Agreement on Subsidies and Countervailing Measures.

Since countries can rule domestically whether domestic industries are in danger and whether foreign countries subsidize the products, the institutional process surrounding the investigation and determinations has significant impacts beyond the countervailing duties.

== By country ==
=== United States ===
Countervailing duties in the U.S. are assessed by the International Trade Administration of the U.S. Department of Commerce which determines whether imports in question are being subsidized and, if so, by how much. If the U.S. International Trade Commission determines that there is material injury to the competing domestic industry, the Department of Commerce will instruct U.S. Customs and Border Protection to levy duties in the amount equivalent to subsidy margins.

Petitions for remedies may be filed by domestic manufacturers or unions within the domestic industry, but the law requires that the petitioners represent at least 25% of the domestic production of the goods for which competition is causing material injury.
