= Exit tax =

Tax on persons emigrating from a country

An exit tax is a tax on persons who cease to be tax-resident in a country. It is usually a form of capital gains tax against unrealized gains.

Exit tax can get triggered by a change of domicile, tax residence, loss of a country's right to tax the gains, transfer of assets to a non-resident. In the United States, the tax is formally called expatriation tax and is levied upon abandoning American citizenship or green card by long-term residents.

== Details ==
Exit taxes serve to protect the tax base, preventing capital gains tax avoidance through emigration. They typically target unrealized capital gains by treating the assets for tax purposes as being sold at fair market value upon emigration (so-called deemed disposal) and taxing the resulting gains, but implementation details vary significantly between countries:

- The tax rate is usually the same as regular capital gain tax rate.
- The tax base tends to be the difference between the fair market value at departure and the original acquisition value. Some countries grant a step-up in cost basis at immigration and thus tax only the gains accrued during the tax residency.
- Some countries allow deferring the payment until the assets are sold.
- Waiver of exit tax might be possible under some circumstances: if the individual later returns to the country, or holds the assets without selling for a certain number of years.
- Non-financial assets (real estate, jewelry, etc.) are often excluded from the scope of exit tax.
- Many countries prescribe a minimum number of residency years before an exit tax becomes applicable.
- A minimum threshold on assets or net worth can be prescribed to minimize the required bureaucracy.
- Some countries implement other anti-avoidance rules besides deemed disposal: extended/trailing residency (e.g. UK, Ireland), reversal of burden of proof (e.g. Italy, Portugal), etc.

A related but distinct concept is corporate exit tax, triggered by relocating a company to another country. Both taxes may get triggered by the same relocation: an emigrating business owner may move the company's tax residence with them due to place of effective management or Controlled Foreign Company rules in the destination country. In the EU, this is mandated by Anti-Tax Avoidance Directive (ATAD) in all member states.

== By country ==
=== Australia ===
Australia imposes an exit tax when an individual stops being a tax resident: assets are deemed to have been sold at the market value on departure (deemed disposal), except for taxable Australian property (like real estate). Conversely, assets are deemed to have been acquired at the market value on the day of becoming a tax resident (deemed acquisition or step-up in cost basis). There is an exemption for temporary residents (mainly, people on temporary visas). The gain is taxed at ordinary income tax rates: up to 45% plus Medicare levy; 50% CGT discount may apply in certain cases. Tax can be deferred until the actual sale, however the assets would get reclassified as taxable Australian property until then.

=== Austria ===
Exit tax applies when Austria loses the right to tax gains on capital assets, whether due to the taxpayer moving abroad or any other circumstance. The event is treated as a deemed disposal of assets at fair market value. Standard CGT rate is 27.5%. Tax can be deferred indefinitely until the actual sale, but only if moving within EU/EEA. There is no minimum threshold on assets or period of residence — once tax residency is established, losing it triggers the tax. A person is generally regarded as a tax resident after a 6 months stay.

=== Belgium ===
Belgium introduced a comprehensive capital gains tax regime for individuals in 2026, along with a related exit tax. The changes apply retroactively from 1 January 2026, with a step-up in cost basis — only the gains accrued from that date are taxable. Standard CGT rate is 10%. Emigration is treated as a deemed disposal of assets. However, the tax can be deferred for 2 years until the actual sale and waived completely if the assets are not sold within 2 years or the taxpayer returns to Belgium. Deferral is granted automatically if moving within EU/EEA, else requires collateral.

=== Canada ===
Canada imposes a departure tax when an individual ceases to be a Canadian tax resident: most property is deemed to have been sold at fair market value on departure (deemed disposition), with gains subject to ordinary capital gains tax. Main exceptions include taxable Canadian property (like real estate), registered plans, and property owned before becoming a Canadian resident by short-term residents (less than 5 in the past 10 years). Conversely, most property is deemed to have been acquired at fair market value on the day of becoming a Canadian resident, so the taxable gain is generally based on the difference between the market value on the date of arrival in Canada (or later acquisition) and the market value on the date of departure. As of 2026, top capital gains tax rate is 27.4%. Payment of departure tax can be deferred until the actual sale, with collateral required above a certain threshold.

Tax residency is based on residential ties, not just days of presence. Leaving Canada without severing them wouldn't terminate tax residency, leaving one liable to Canadian taxes on worldwide income and gains. Treaty tie-breakers can override this and make someone a deemed non-resident, triggering departure tax.

=== Denmark ===
For shares, exit tax (fraflytterskat) normally applies to portfolios from 100,000 kr. (approx. US$10,000) and if the individual was fully liable to Danish tax for at least 7 of the past 10 years. Full tax liability status matters for counting the years, not just treaty tax residency status. Shares are deemed to be disposed at the day of departure; tax rate is 27%/42%. Tax can be deferred (henstandssaldo), subject to annual compliance obligations and possibly collateral if moving outside the EU/Nordics.

=== Eritrea ===
Eritrea levies a yearly 2% Recovery and Rehabilitation Tax on the worldwide income of its citizens living abroad, also commonly called diaspora tax. It is thus one of the few countries (along with the US) that practices a citizenship-based taxation. The tax has been criticized by a number of governments for intimidation practices in its collection and alleged use in funding Eritrea's war efforts.

=== Finland ===
No general exit tax on unrealized gains for individuals. There is an exception for deferred gains from certain tax-neutral share exchanges. Additionally, Finnish citizens are deemed to remain tax residents for 3 years after departure unless they prove that substantial ties with Finland have ended.

=== France ===
According to the law "L'impôt sur les plus-values latentes en cas de transfert du domicile fiscal hors de France" Article 167 bis Code général des impôts, there is a rule forcing French tax-subjects to pay a tax if they move abroad to certain countries and not return promptly. France's exit tax applies to individuals who have been tax residents in France for at least 6 of the last 10 years before their departure and have ownership of more than €800,000 worth of shares or other financial instruments, or are holding more than 50% of the shares in a company. A deferral of payment is possible if the person relocates to an EU/EEA country or a country with a tax treaty with France that includes administrative assistance. If the individual retains the assets for a certain period (usually 15 years) or returns to France to become a tax subject, the tax may be canceled.

=== Germany ===
Germany has a long history of taxing emigration. The most famous example being the Reich Flight Tax implemented in 1931 to stem capital flight during the unstable interwar period. After seizing power in 1933, the Nazi government weaponized the tax to confiscate assets from persecuted people, mostly Jews, who sought to flee Nazi Germany.

Contemporary legislation traces back to the scandal with Helmut Horten, a department-store magnate who moved to Switzerland in 1968, sold his business stake and paid virtually no tax. The event prompted enactment of the Foreign Tax Act (Außensteuergesetz) in 1972, whose exit-tax provision (§ 6 AStG) is nicknamed lex Horten.

As of 2026, exit taxation (Wegzugsbesteuerung) is triggered for certain assets when an individual loses unlimited German tax liability, after being subject to it for at least 7 of the past 12 years. Gifting or inheritance to a non-resident or another event by which Germany loses the right to tax the gains may trigger the tax as well. The law has historically targeted substantial ownership in corporations (at least 1% share since 2002). From 2025, the scope was extended to investment funds (such as mutual funds and ETFs) with acquisition costs of at least €500,000 in a single fund or at least 1% share within the past 5 years, and special investment funds with no minimum threshold. Affected assets are deemed disposed at fair market value. Gain is taxed as partial income (Teileinkünfteverfahren) with an effective tax rate of up to roughly 28.5%, plus church tax if applicable. Payment can be split into 7 equal interest-free yearly installments, if collateral is provided.

German exit tax applies to ownership in any corporation, from large publicly-traded companies to smallest one-person business entities. Unlisted shares are usually valued using standardized methods, such as vereinfachtes Ertragswertverfahren: 13.75× average annual profit, with a floor at the company's book value. This can assign a substantial value even to young or loss-making firms, producing a tax bill disconnected from any realistic sale price and payable in cash regardless if any shares are or can be sold. It is criticized as one of the biggest "mobility blockers" in German tax law, locking-in entrepreneurs and discouraging start-ups.

Additionally, German law has a concept of extended limited tax liability. It applies for up to 10 years to German citizens who were tax residents for at least 5 of the previous 10 years, move to a low-tax jurisdiction, and retain substantial economic interests in Germany.

=== Ireland ===
No general exit tax on unrealized gains for individuals. However, Ireland has a provision for taxing former residents: an individual becomes ordinarily resident after 3 continuous years of tax residence, and remains so for 3 years after leaving. During these years, depending on their domicile status, Ireland may continue to tax their worldwide income and gains, or at least the portion that is remitted to Ireland. Investments in Irish ETFs and mutual funds, as well as "similar in all material respects" to them offshore funds, are subject to deemed disposal every 8 years; gains are classified as "Case IV" income, automatically within the scope of Irish tax, and thus may get taxed during this 3 year ordinarily residence tail.

=== Iceland ===
No general exit tax on unrealized gains for individuals. However, former residents remain fully tax liable for 3 years after departure, unless they prove that they have become subject to taxation in another country.

=== Israel ===
Individuals are deemed to have sold their assets the day before ceasing their tax residence in Israel. Standard CGT rate is 25%. Tax may be deferred until the actual sale. Assets owned before becoming Israeli resident may be exempt for 10 years.

=== Italy ===
No general exit tax on unrealized capital gains for individuals. There is an anti-avoidance rule: Italian citizens moving to certain low-tax jurisdictions are presumed to remain tax residents unless they prove otherwise. Tax residence may also continue through residential or close family ties in Italy.

=== Japan ===
Exit tax applies to high net-worth individuals, holding over ¥100M (approx. US$900,000) in financial assets, who resided in Japan for more than 5 of the past 10 years. For foreign nationals, time on "Table 1" visa status doesn't count towards these 5 years. The tax was introduced in 2015 tax reform, and began applying to foreigners with a "Table 2" status (permanent residents, spouse/child of a Japanese) from 2020. Assets are deemed disposed at departure; CGT rate is 20.315% (15.315% national + 5% local tax). Tax can be deferred for 5-10 years, if the taxpayer appoints a tax agent and provides collateral, and cancelled if the taxpayer returns to Japan within the deferral period.

=== Netherlands ===
The Netherlands has treaties with Belgium and Portugal permitting them to charge emigration tax against Dutch people who move to those countries. The aim is to impose a tax on persons who move abroad and cash out on the tax-free appreciation of their Dutch pensions. However, in 2009, the Supreme Court of the Netherlands ruled that the Tax and Customs Administration could not impose an emigration tax on a Dutch man who moved to France in 2001.

=== Luxembourg ===
No general exit tax on unrealized gains for individuals. Capital gains from shares are tax-free in general, except for short-term holdings and substantial (over 10%) shareholdings. Former residents who lived in Luxembourg for more than 15 years remain taxable for 5 years after departure on gains from selling substantial shareholdings in Luxembourg companies.

=== New Zealand ===
Individuals subject to foreign investment fund (FIF) rules (generally, shares in overseas companies/funds above NZ$50,000) are deemed to have sold their FIF assets when losing tax residency.

=== Norway ===
Norway imposes an exit tax on unrealised capital gains when departing the country and ceasing to be tax resident, which is also relevant when inheriting or receiving gifts from someone who was subject to exit tax. The rules have changed often and significantly throughout 2022, 2023, 2024, and 2025. An English language summary of all the changes, and the current rules, can be found at the Norwegian Tax Administration website.

=== Poland ===
Exit tax is triggered when an individual changes tax residence after being a Polish tax resident for at least 5 of the past 10 years, or by transferring assets (especially, business interests) abroad in such a way that Poland loses the right to tax their disposal. There is an exemption for assets under 4'000'000 zł (approx. US$1,000,000) in total market value. Tax rate is generally 19%. There is no step-up in cost basis, and no indefinite tax deferral (whether moving to EU or not) — only a possibility to pay in installments over 5 years.

=== Portugal ===
No general exit tax on unrealized capital gains, however there are specific provisions for cryptocurrency assets, deferred capital gains from certain share reorganisations and employee equity plans. There is also an anti-avoidance rule: Portuguese nationals who relocate to low-tax jurisdictions are deemed Portuguese tax residents for 4 years after departure, unless they prove they moved for a valid non-tax reason.

=== Singapore ===
Singapore has no capital gains tax and thus no exit tax on unrealized capital gains.

There is a "deemed exercise" rule concerning employee equity for the purposes of income tax. Foreign citizens with unexercised share options (ESOP) and unvested or restricted share awards (ESOW) granted while employed in Singapore are deemed to realize the gains from them one month before they cease Singapore employment.

=== South Africa ===
The current South African exit tax regime works in concert with South Africa's foreign exchange controls. A person who is a resident of South Africa as defined under the exchange control laws (someone who is resident or domiciled in South Africa) may change status to become an emigrant, if the person is leaving the Common Monetary Area (South Africa, Namibia, Swaziland, and Lesotho) to take up permanent residence in another country. A single emigrant may expatriate up to R4 million of assets without exit charge, while a family is entitled to twice that amount. The emigrant must declare all worldwide assets to an Authorised Dealer of the South African Reserve Bank, and obtain a tax clearance certificate from the South African Revenue Service.

=== South Korea ===
Individuals who had a domicile or residence in South Korea for at least 5 of the last 10 years before departure may be subject to exit tax on unrealized capital gains. The rules were first introduced in 2018 for large shareholders of domestic companies. From 2027, exit tax is expanded to cover foreign stock portfolios worth over ₩500M (approx. US$400,000). Holdings of foreign workers and their families are excluded in some cases.

=== Spain ===
In December 2014, a new 'Exit Tax' was announced which is governed by Article 95 of the Income Tax Act. This applies to departing Spanish resident taxpayers with shares worth more than four million euros or one million if they hold a stake of 25% of a single business and then transfer their habitual residence outside Spain if they have previously lived in Spain 10 of the last 15 years.

=== Sweden ===
No general exit tax on unrealized gains for individuals. Capital gains on Swedish shares and part-ownership rights, as well as foreign ones acquired while resident in Sweden, remain taxable if sold within 10 years after departure. Fund units are excluded, and tax treaties may further restrict taxation. Additionally, Swedish citizens and persons resident in Sweden for at least 10 years remain fully tax resident so long as they retain substantial ties to Sweden; during the first 5 years they bear the burden of proving that those ties have ended.

=== United Kingdom ===
No exit taxes or deemed disposal rules. However, there are provisions for a possible retroactive taxation after emigration.

A person who was a tax resident for at least 4 of the 7 years prior to departure and returning within the next 5 years is a treated as a temporary non-resident. Gains realized while abroad may get taxed on return.

A person who was a tax resident for at least 10 of the past 20 years becomes a long-term resident for the purposes of inheritance tax (IHT), taxable on their worldwide assets. They remains so for a period of 3 to 10 years after emigration, so called "IHT Tail".

=== United States ===
Unlike most countries, the United States taxes its citizens on worldwide income, even if they are a permanent resident in another country. To deter tax avoidance by abandonment of citizenship, the United States imposes an expatriation tax on high-net-worth and high-income individuals who give up U.S. citizenship. The tax also applies to lawful permanent residents or green-card holders who are considered "long-term residents." The Internal Revenue Code defines a long-term resident as any individual who is a lawful permanent resident of the United States in at least 8 taxable years during the period of 15 taxable years ending with the taxable year during which the expatriation occurs.

The first U.S. income tax to include U.S. citizens living overseas dates to 1862, but the first law to authorize taxation of former citizens was passed over a century later, in 1966. The 1966 law created Internal Revenue Code Section 877, which allowed the U.S.-source income of former citizens to be taxed for up to 10 years following the date of their loss of citizenship. Section 877 was first amended in 1996, at a time when the issue of renunciation of U.S. citizenship for tax purposes was receiving a great deal of public attention; the same attention resulted in the passage of the Reed Amendment, which attempted to prevent former U.S. citizens who renounced citizenship to avoid taxation from obtaining visas, but which was never enforced. The American Jobs Creation Act of 2004 amended Section 877 again. Under the new law, any individual who had a net worth of $2 million or an average income tax liability of $124,000 for the five previous years (adjusted annually for inflation) who renounces his or her citizenship is automatically assumed to have done so for tax avoidance reasons and is subject to additional taxes. Furthermore, with certain exceptions covered expatriates who spend at least 31 days in the United States in any year during the 10-year period following expatriation were subject to US taxation as if they were U.S. citizens or resident aliens.

A bill—which failed to advance to the Senate—entitled Tax Collection Responsibility Act of 2007 was introduced during the 110th session of congress in July 2007 by Charles B. Rangel. It contemplated, among others, a revision of the taxation of former American citizens whose citizenship officially ends. In particular, all property of an expatriate up to certain exceptions would be treated as having been sold on the day before the expatriation for its fair market value with any gain exceeding $600,000 classified as taxable income.

The HEART Act, passed on 17 June 2008, created the new Section 877A, which imposed a substantially different expatriation tax from that of the earlier Section 877. The new expatriation tax law, effective for calendar year 2009, defines "covered expatriates" as expatriates who have a net worth of $2 million, or a 5-year average income tax liability exceeding $139,000, to be adjusted for inflation, or who have not filed an IRS Form 8854 certifying they have complied with all federal tax obligations for the preceding 5 years. Notwithstanding the above, certain dual citizens by birth and certain minors as defined in Section 877A(g)(1)(B) are not considered "covered expatriates." Under the new expatriation tax law, "covered expatriates" are treated as if they had liquidated all of their assets on the date prior to their expatriation. Under this provision, the taxpayer's net gain is computed as if he or she had actually liquidated their assets. Net gain is the difference between the fair market value (theoretical selling price) and the taxpayer's cost basis (actual purchase price). Once net gain is calculated, any net gain greater than $600,000 will be taxed as income in that calendar year. The tax applies whether or not an actual sale is made by the taxpayer, and whether or not the notional gains arise on assets in the taxpayer's home country acquired before immigration to the United States. It is irrelevant that the gains may have partly arisen before the taxpayer moved to the U.S.

The new tax law also applies to deferred compensation (401(a), 403(b) plans, pension plans, stock options, etc.) of the expatriate. Traditional or regular IRAs are defined as specific tax deferred accounts rather than deferred compensation items. If the payer of the deferred compensation is a US citizen and the taxpayer expatriating has waived the right to a lower withholding rate, then the covered expatriate is charged a 30% withholding tax on their deferred compensation. If the covered expatriate does not meet the aforementioned criteria then the deferred compensation is taxed (as income) based on the present value of the deferred compensation.

In 2012, in the wake of Eduardo Saverin's renunciation of his citizenship, Sen. Chuck Schumer (D-NY) proposed the Ex-PATRIOT Act to levy additional taxes upon citizens renouncing their citizenship.

== See also ==
- Departure tax
- Diploma tax
- Double taxation
