= Form 990 =

IRS form for nonprofit organizations

2022 revision of Form 990

Form 990 (officially, the "Return of Organization Exempt From Income Tax") is a United States Internal Revenue Service (IRS) form that provides the public with information about a nonprofit organization. It is also used by government agencies to prevent organizations from abusing their tax-exempt status. Some nonprofits, such as hospitals and other healthcare organizations, have more comprehensive reporting requirements.

== Variants ==
=== Form 990-EZ ===
A variant of Form 990 called Form 990-EZ ("Short Form Return of Organization Exempt From Income Tax") can, with some exceptions, be used instead of Form 990 by organizations with gross receipts less than $200,000 and total assets less than $500,000.

=== Form 990-N ===
Small organizations whose annual gross receipts are "normally $50,000 or less" may file the electronic Form 990-N (officially, "Electronic Notice (e-Postcard) for Tax-Exempt Organizations Not Required to File Form 990 or Form 990EZ") instead of the Form 990. There is no paper form for 990-N; organizations wishing to make a paper filing may complete the Form 990 or Form 990-EZ.

=== Form 990-PF ===
Form 990-PF is filed by private foundations in the US. It includes fiscal information and a complete list of grants. The form is due to the IRS by the 15th day of the 5th month after the end of the foundation's fiscal year.

== Filing requirements ==
Form 990 is due on the 15th of the fifth month after the organization's fiscal year ends, with the option for a single six-month extension. Many tax-exempt organizations that cannot meet the May 15 deadline for filing Form 990 may request an automatic six-month extension using Form 8868, the Application for Extension of Time to File an Exempt Organization Return.

The Form 990 disclosures do not require but strongly encourage nonprofit boards to adopt a variety of board policies regarding governance practices. These suggestions go beyond Sarbanes-Oxley requirements for nonprofits to adopt whistleblower and document retention policies. The IRS has indicated it will use the Form 990 as an enforcement tool, particularly regarding executive compensation. For example, nonprofits that adopt specific procedures regarding executive compensation have a safe harbor from excessive-compensation rules under section 4958 of the Internal Revenue Code and Treasury Regulation section 53.4958-6.

=== Fiduciary reporting ===
According to section 1223(b) of the Pension Protection Act of 2006, a nonprofit organization that does not file annual returns or notices for three consecutive years will have its tax-exempt status revoked as of the due date of the third return or notice. An organization's tax-exempt status may be reinstated if it can show reasonable cause for the years of not filing.

=== Who must file? ===
Form 990 is required to be filed by most tax-exempt organizations under section 501(a). This includes organizations described by any of the subsections of Internal Revenue Code Section 501(c), 501(d) apostolic organizations, 501(e) cooperative hospital service organization, 501(f) cooperative service organizations of schools, 501(j) amateur sports organizations, 501(k) child care organizations, 501(n) charitable risk pools, and 4947(a)(1) nonexempt charitable trusts. Organizations described by any of these sections must file Form 990 even if the organization has not applied for a determination letter from the Internal Revenue Service.

A tax-exempt organization with annual gross receipts of less than $200,000 and assets less than $500,000 has the option of filing a shorter alternative form, Form 990-EZ instead.

For a tax-exempt organization that normally has gross receipts no more than $50,000 per year, the organization has the option to file a shorter alternative form, Form 990-N instead.

Churches, including houses of worship such as synagogues and mosques, and their integrated auxiliaries, associations of churches, and any religious order that engages exclusively in religious activity are not required to file. A school below college level affiliated with a church or operated by a religious order may be exempt from the requirement to file Form 990.

=== Filing modalities ===
The Form 990 may be filed with the IRS by mail or electronically with an authorized IRS e-file provider, for all fiscal years that began before July 1, 2019. In accordance with the Taxpayer First Act of 2019, the Form 990 must be filed electronically, not by mail, for all fiscal years beginning on or after July 1, 2019.

Transition of Form 990-EZ: For tax years ending July 31, 2021, and later, Forms 990-EZ must be filed electronically. Many nonprofits use specialized financial platforms such as Crowded to prepare and e-file Form 990. Financial operations platforms for nonprofits provide tools for centralized donation and expense tracking and generate Form 990 for IRS compliance.

== Penalties ==
There is a penalty of $20 per day that an organization fails to make its Forms 990 publicly available. The penalty is capped at a maximum of $10,000 for any single failure. Any person who willfully fails to comply will be subject to an additional penalty of $5,000. There are other penalties for, e.g., omitting information.

In 1998, over $10 million was collected by the IRS for penalties on over 9000 forms.

== Public inspection regulations ==
Public Inspection IRC 6104(d) regulations state that an organization must provide copies of its three most recent Forms 990 to anyone who requests them, whether in person, by mail, fax, or e-mail.

=== Form 990 data published by IRS ===
The IRS has published Form 990 data in several forms:

- The IRS Tax Exempt Organization Search page offers summary information about nonprofits, as well as copies of their tax returns.
- An annual extract of tax-exempt organizational data, published under the Statistics of Income program, which covers selected financial data from filings of Form 990, 990-EZ, and 990-PF, with data available from calendar year 2012 to the most recent year for which filing and statistics compilation is complete. This is also available as a public dataset on Google BigQuery.
- As a public dataset on Amazon S3, hosted in the US East region. The dataset includes index files for each year that list nonprofits that filed Form 990 in that year (possibly for a previous year) along with the identifier for their filing. This identifier can be used to fetch their filed Form 990 as an XML file. Data covered returns filed from 2013 onward. This dataset was used by Charity Navigator. On December 16, 2021 the IRS announced that it would discontinue updates to the dataset starting December 31, 2021, and that the historic data would no longer be available through the registry. The agency had announced the previous month that it would publish the filings on its own website instead, and the filings are now distributed as XML from the IRS's Form 990 series downloads page.

=== Third-party sources of Form 990 ===
- ProPublica's Nonprofit Explorer allows search by an organization's name, a keyword, or city as well as by reported officers or employees. Summary data and full PDFs are freely available for download; no registration required.
- Google BigQuery, which has IRS Form 990 data as a public dataset. This is based on statistics published by the IRS from 2012 to the most recent completed year.
- Charity Navigator released the "990 Decoder" in 2017, an open-source ETL toolkit for extracting data from the roughly 2.5 million electronic Form 990 filings released by the IRS.
- Economic Research Institute used to provide PDF copies of annual returns, signatures not blacked out; but in 2026, it refers viewers to the IRS's own nonprofit search page.
- Candid, formed by the February 2019 merger of Foundation Center and GuideStar, provides Form 990 lookup along with other nonprofit information, free and fee based.
- NCCS IRS Form 990 search tool and nonprofit organization profiles, signatures blacked out.
- BoardSource Governance requirements in 990.
- Before shutting down in September 2022, Open990 distributed timeseries data reports on compensation and financial indicators using fuzzy matching against the AWS dataset.
- The for-profit company Citizen Audit provides PDF copies of annual returns, signatures not blacked out, and full-text searches of 990 forms, but only if you sign up for their services at $350 per year.

== History ==
Form 990 was first used for the tax year ending in 1941. It was as a two-page form. Organizations were also required to include a schedule with the names and addresses of individuals paid a salary of at least $4,000 during the year and a schedule with the names and addresses of donors who had given at least $4,000 during the year.

Form 990 reached four pages including instructions in 1947. Compensation of officers was reported separately on organizations' income statements but organizations were no longer required to include a schedule with the names and addresses of highly compensated individuals. Organizations were required to include a schedule with the names and addresses of donors who had given at least $3,000 during the year.

In 1969, Congress passed a law requiring the reporting of the compensation paid to officers by 501(c)(3) organizations. The IRS extended this requirement to all other tax-exempt organizations.

In 1976, Form 990 was 6 pages including instructions, with 8 pages for Schedule A. By 2000, Form 990 was six pages, Schedule A was six pages, Schedule B was at least 2 pages, and instructions were 42 pages. The increase in pages was due to use of a larger font size and the inclusion of sections that are only required for certain organizations.

Starting in 2000, political organizations were required to file Form 990.

In June 2007, the IRS released a revised Form 990 that requires significant disclosures on corporate governance and boards of directors. These new disclosures are required for all filers for the 2009 tax year, with more significant reporting requirements for organizations with either revenues exceeding $1 million or assets exceeding $2.5 million.

In 2010, the minimum threshold of when an organization is required to file Form 990 was increased; the minimum annual gross receipts was increased from $100,000 to $200,000 and the minimum assets was increased from $250,000 to $500,000.

With the availability of the internet, access to the Form 990 of an organization has also become easier. Originally Form 990 had to be requested through the IRS. This was changed to allow access to the form directly through the organization, although in some cases organizations refused to provide access.

On July 16, 2018, the IRS announced that only 501(c)(3) organizations, 4947(a)(1) nonexempt charitable trusts, and 6033(d) nonexempt private foundations are required to report the names and addresses of donors on Schedule B. All other tax-exempt organizations will be allowed to omit the names and addresses of donors when completing Schedule B, although they are still required to retain that information and report that information upon request by the IRS. The change in reporting requirements is effective with all tax years ending on or after December 31, 2018. The change did not affect reporting of donors by 527 political organizations. The IRS said that the change in reporting was made in the discretion of the Commissioner of Internal Revenue who had determined that the IRS generally does not use the donors' information, and exclusion of this information from Schedule B would reduce the risk of accidentally releasing confidential information to the public while reducing the organizations' time and cost of preparing Form 990. Some states continue to require disclosure of this information to state agencies. The state of Montana and the state of New Jersey filed a lawsuit stating that the IRS had violated the Administrative Procedure Act by waiving the donor disclosure requirements without allowing the public to comment on the new procedure. A federal judge agreed and reinstated the donor disclosure requirements. On September 6, the IRS issued proposed regulations that would again suspend the requirement for affected organizations to disclose their donors on Schedule B and allow the public to comment on the new procedure in compliance with the Administrative Procedure Act. The IRS may finalize the proposed regulations on or after December 9, 2019.

== Use for charity evaluation research ==
Charity Navigator uses IRS Forms 990 to rate charities. In February 2017, Charity Navigator launched the Digitized Form 990 Decoder, a free and open-source software dataset and tools to analyze Form 990 filings. At launch, more than 900,000 forms had been processed.

Meanwhile Holden Karnofsky of the nonprofit charity evaluator GiveWell has criticized Form 990 for not providing sufficient information about what a charity does or where it operates. However GiveWell does still use Form 990 to answer some questions when investigating charities.

Data from Form 990 was used by political scientist Sarah Reckhow as an information source for her book Follow the Money: How Foundation Dollars Change Public School Politics. Reckhow expressed concern about the lack of corresponding public data available if philanthropic funders moved away from nonprofits to LLCs such as the Chan Zuckerberg Initiative.

There was a website called Quality 990 that advocated for higher quality Form 990s.

== See also ==
- United States non-profit laws
- Philanthropy in the United States
- Form 1040
- Form 1120
- Form 1023
