= IRS tax forms =

Financial documents sent to the US Treasury for tax collection

The United States Internal Revenue Service (IRS) uses various forms to collect financial information from taxpayers and tax-exempt organizations. These forms are used to report income, calculate federal taxes owed, and disclose other required information in accordance with the Internal Revenue Code (IRC). The IRS provides more than 800 different forms and schedules for various tax-related purposes. In addition to federal forms, other tax forms are filed separately with state and local tax authorities.

The IRS numbered the forms sequentially as they were introduced.

== Individual forms ==
=== 1040 ===
First page of Form 1040 for 2024 tax year

As of the 2018 tax year, Form 1040, U.S. Individual Income Tax Return, is the only form used for personal (individual) federal income tax returns filed with the IRS. In prior years, it had been one of three forms (1040 [the "Long Form"], 1040A [the "Short Form"] and 1040EZ – see below for explanations of each) used for such returns. The first Form 1040 was published for use for the tax years 1913, 1914, and 1915. For 1916, Form 1040 was converted to an annual form (i.e., updated each year with the new tax year printed on the form). Initially, the IRS mailed tax booklets (Form 1040, instructions, and most common attachments) to all households. As alternative delivery methods (CPA/Attorneys, internet forms) increased in popularity, the IRS sent fewer packets via mail. In 2009 this practice was discontinued.

Income tax returns for individual calendar year taxpayers are due by April 15 of the next year, except when April 15 falls on a Saturday, Sunday, or a legal holiday. In those circumstances, the returns are due on the next business day. An automatic extension until Oct 15 to file Form 1040 can be obtained by filing Form 4868.

Form 1040 is two abbreviated pages, not including attachments. Prior to the 2018 tax year, it had been two full pages, again not counting attachments, but following the passage of the Tax Cuts and Jobs Act of 2017, the IRS dramatically shortened both pages. The current first page collects information about the taxpayer(s) and any dependents and includes the signature line. The current second page includes information on income items and adjustments to income, and additionally calculates the allowable deductions and credits, tax due given the income figure, and applies funds already withheld from wages or estimated payments made towards the tax liability. Prior to 2018, information on income items and adjustments to income had been entered on the first page. The presidential election campaign fund checkoff, which allows taxpayers to designate that the federal government gives $3 of the tax it receives to the presidential election campaign fund, is near the top of the first page on both pre-and post-2018 versions of Form 1040.

Form 1040 has 20 attachments (up from 14 before 2018), called "schedules", which may need to be filed depending on the taxpayer:

- Schedule A itemizes allowable deductions against income; instead of filling out Schedule A, taxpayers may choose to take a standard deduction of between $12,000 and $24,000 (for the tax year 2018), depending on age, filing status, and whether the taxpayer and/or spouse is blind.
- Schedule B enumerates interest and/or dividend income, and is required if either interest or dividends received during the tax year exceed $1,500 from all sources or if the filer had certain foreign accounts.
- Schedule C lists income and expenses related to self-employment, and is used by sole proprietors.
- Schedule D is used to compute capital gains and losses incurred during the tax year. NOTE: Along with Schedule D, Form 8949 and its Instructions may be required.
- Schedule E is used to report income and expenses arising from the rental of real property, royalties, or from pass-through entities (like trusts, estates, partnerships, or S corporations).
- Schedule EIC is used to document a taxpayer's eligibility for the Earned Income Credit.
- Schedule F is used to report income and expenses related to farming.
- Schedule H is used to report taxes owed due to the employment of household help.
- Schedule J is used when averaging farm income over a period of three years.
- Schedule L (until 2010) was used to figure an increased standard deduction in certain cases.
- Schedule M (2009 and 2010) was used to claim the Making Work Pay tax credit (6.2% earned income credit, up to $400).
- Schedule R is used to calculate the Credit for the Elderly or the Disabled.
- Schedule SE is used to calculate the self-employment tax owed on income from self-employment (such as on a Schedule C or Schedule F, or in a partnership).
- Schedule 8812 is used to calculate the Child Tax Credit.

In 2014 there were two additions to Form 1040 due to the implementation of the Affordable Care Act – the premium tax credit and the individual mandate.

- The following schedules were introduced for the 2018 tax year:
  - Schedule 1 is used to report most income from sources other than wages, interest, dividends, pensions (including retirement accounts), and Social Security, and is also used to calculate adjustments to income.
  - Schedule 2 is used to report additional taxes owed, such as alternative minimum tax, advance premium tax credit repayment, self-employment taxes, and taxes on IRAs.
  - Schedule 3 is used to claim non-refundable tax credits, but since 2018 has been expanded to be used to report refundable tax payments and previous tax payments that may be deducted from taxes owed.
  - Schedule 4 is used for the calculation of certain types of taxes, among them self-employment tax and uncollected Social Security and Medicare taxes.
  - Schedule 5 is used to add up tax payments, such as estimated tax payments or any payments made when an extension of time is filed.
  - Schedule 6 allows the taxpayer to appoint a third party to discuss the return with the IRS.

Much of the information on the new numbered schedules had previously been included on Form 1040.

Since 2019, only numbered schedules 1, 2, and 3 are still used to report figures for the 1040.

In most situations, other Internal Revenue Service or Social Security Administration forms such as Form W-2 must be attached to the Form 1040, in addition to the Form 1040 schedules. There are over 100 other, specialized forms that may need to be completed along with Schedules and Form 1040.

=== Short forms ===
Over the years, other "Short Forms" were used for short periods of time. For example, in the 1960s, they used an IBM Card on which a few lines could be written which would then be transcribed onto another card. The other card looked the same but had holes in it which a computer or "unit record" machine could read. As with the other forms, there was always a place for a signature. The two most recently used short forms, 1040A and 1040EZ, were discontinued after the 2017 tax year.

The Form 1040A ("short form"), US individual income tax return, was a shorter version of the Form 1040. Use of Form 1040A was limited to taxpayers with taxable income below $100,000 who took the standard deduction instead of itemizing deductions; it was originally one page until the 1982 edition, when it expanded to two pages.

The Form 1040EZ ("easy form"), Income Tax Return for Single and Joint Filers With No Dependents, was the simplest, six-section Federal income tax return, introduced in 1982. Its use was limited to taxpayers with taxable income below $100,000 (as of tax year 2016) who take the standard deduction instead of itemizing deductions and have no dependents.

== Fiduciary reporting ==
According to section 1223(b) of the Pension Protection Act of 2006, a nonprofit organization that does not file annual returns or notices for three consecutive years will have its tax-exempt status revoked as of the due date of the third return or notice. An organization's tax-exempt status may be reinstated if it can show reasonable cause for the years of nonfailing.

=== 990 ===
The Form 990 provides the public with financial information about a nonprofit organization, and is often the only source of such information. It is also used by government agencies to prevent organizations from abusing their tax-exempt status. In June 2007, the IRS released a new Form 990 that requires significant disclosures on corporate governance and boards of directors. These new disclosures are required for all nonprofit filers for the 2009 tax year, with more significant reporting requirements for nonprofits with over $1 million in revenues or $2.5 million in assets. In addition, certain nonprofits have more comprehensive reporting requirements, such as hospitals and other health care organizations (Schedule H). The Form 990 may be filed with the IRS by mail or electronically with an Authorized IRS e-file Provider.

The Form 990 disclosures do not require but strongly encourage nonprofit boards to adopt a variety of board policies regarding governance practices. These suggestions go beyond Sarbanes-Oxley requirements for nonprofits to adopt whistleblower and document retention policies. The IRS has indicated they will use the Form 990 as an enforcement tool, particularly regarding executive compensation. For example, nonprofits that adopt specific procedures regarding executive compensation are offered safe harbor from excessive compensation rules under section 4958 of the Internal Revenue Code and Treasury Regulation section 53.4958-6.

Public Inspection IRC 6104(d) regulations state that an organization must provide copies of its three most recent Forms 990 to anyone who requests them, whether in person, by mail, fax, or e-mail. Additionally, requests may be made via the IRS using Form 4506-A, and PDF copies can often be found online as noted below.

- New IRS Form 990
- Instructions for Form 990 and Form 990-EZ
- Due 15th of 5th month after fiscal year, with up to 6 months of extensions. Late penalty for political organizations is $20–$100/day (not clear for other nonprofits), and penalty for failure to provide to the public is $20 per day.
- Citizen Audit provides PDF copies of annual returns, signatures not blacked out.
- Economic Research Institute provides PDF copies of annual returns, signatures not blacked out.
- Foundation Center IRS Form 990 lookup tool; provides PDF copies of annual returns, signatures blacked out.
- Guidestar IRS Form 990's and other information for selection of nonprofits, free and fee based
- NCCS IRS Form 990 search tool and nonprofit organization profiles, signatures blacked out.
- Charity Navigator uses IRS Forms 990 to rate charities.
- BoardSource Governance requirements in 990.

In addition to Form 990, tax-exempt organizations are also subject to a variety of disclosure and compliance requirements through various schedules which are attached to Form 990 (and, in some cases, 990-EZ or 990-PF). Filing of schedules by organizations supplements, enhances, and further clarifies disclosures and compliance reporting made in Form 990. Often, filing of schedules is mandatory, but there are situations where organizations not otherwise subject to filing requirements may consider completing certain schedules despite not being technically obligated to. The current list of possible schedule filings are:

- Schedule A – Public Charity Status and Public Support
- Schedule B – Schedule of Contributors
- Schedule C – Political Campaign and Lobbying Activities
- Schedule D – Supplemental Financial Statements
- Schedule E – Schools
- Schedule F – Statement of Activities Outside the United States
- Schedule G – Supplemental Information Regarding Fundraising or Gaming Activities
- Schedule H – Hospitals
- Schedule I – Grants and Other Assistance to Organizations, Governments, and Individuals in the United States
- Schedule J – Compensation Information
- Schedule K – Supplemental Information on Tax-Exempt Bonds
- Schedule L – Transactions With Interested Persons
- Schedule M – Noncash Contributions
- Schedule N – Liquidation, Termination, Dissolution, or Significant Disposition of Assets
- Schedule O – Supplemental Information to Form 990
- Schedule R – Related Organizations and Unrelated Partnerships

=== 5500 ===
The Form 5500, Annual Return/Report of Employee Benefit Plan, was developed jointly by the IRS, United States Department of Labor, and Pension Benefit Guaranty Corporation to satisfy filing requirements both under the Internal Revenue Code (IRC) and the Employee Retirement Income Security Act (ERISA). The Form 5500 is an important compliance, research, and disclosure tool intended to assure that employee benefit plans are properly managed and to provide participants, beneficiaries, and regulators with sufficient information to protect their rights. Starting in 2009, all Forms 5500 must be filed electronically on the website of the Department of Labor.

=== Other ===
The Form 1040NR, US Nonresident Alien Income Tax Return, and its shorter version Form 1040NR-EZ, US Income Tax Return for Certain Nonresident Aliens With No Dependents, are used by nonresident aliens who have US source income and therefore have to file a US tax return. Joint returns are not permitted, so that husband and wife must each file a separate return. The Form 1040NR-EZ can be used under conditions similar to those for the 1040EZ form.

The Form 1040X, Amended US Individual Tax Return, is used to make corrections to Form 1040, Form 1040A, and Form 1040EZ tax returns that have been previously filed. Generally for a tax refund, this form must be filed within 3 years after the date that the original version was filed, or within 2 years after the date that the tax was paid, whichever is later. Forms 1040X are processed manually and therefore take longer than regular returns. For years prior to 2010, Form 1040X had three columns: for the amounts from the original version, for the net increase or decrease for each line being changed, and for the corrected amounts. For 2010, the form was condensed with a single column for the corrected amounts. Due to confusion amongst taxpayers on how to complete the single-column form, the IRS revised the Form 1040X again for 2011 by returning to the original three-column format.

Self-employed individuals and others who do not have enough income taxes withheld, might need to file Form 1040-ES, Estimated Tax for Individuals, each quarter to make estimated installments of annual tax liability (pay-as-you-go tax).

== Entity returns ==
- Form 1065, U.S. Return of Partnership Income, is used by partnerships for tax returns.
- Form 1041, U.S. Income Tax Return for Estates and Trusts, is used by estates and trusts for tax returns.

=== 1120 series ===
- Form 1120, U.S. Corporation Income Tax Return, is used by C corporations for tax returns.
- Form 1120S, U.S. Income Tax Return for an S Corporation, is used by S corporations for tax returns.
- Form 1120-C, U.S. Income Tax Return for Cooperative Associations, is used by cooperatives for tax returns.
- Form 1120-H, U.S. Income Tax Return for Homeowners Associations, is used by condominium and housing associations for tax returns.

Form 1120 (officially the "U.S Corporate Income Tax Return") is one of the IRS tax forms used by corporations (specifically, C corporations) in the United States to report their income, gains, losses, deductions, credits and to figure out their tax liability. The form has many variants for corporations with different structures; the most common variant is the Form 1120S used by S corporations. Form 1120 consists of 1 page with 36 lines and 6 additional schedules. Lines 1–11 deal with income, lines 12–29 deal with deductions, and lines 30–36 deal with tax, refundable credits, and payments.

Form 1120 was originally introduced under the presidency of Woodrow Wilson at the end of World War I, and described as the "blank on which corporations will report their war excess profits and income taxes." The first applicable tax year was 1918, and the form was made available around March 15, 1919. Two other forms released the same year were Form 1065 (for partnerships and personal service corporations) and Form 1115 (for nonresident aliens to receive the benefit of personal exemptions). The release of these forms came only a few years after the release of Form 1040, the personal income tax return form, that first applied to the 1913 tax year.

The Tax Foundation has published studies on the effective tax rate and its distribution across corporations, as well as the compliance cost. Form 1120 is also included in Tax Foundation reports on the overall cost of tax compliance. A New York Times article in 1994 cited a Tax Foundation report based on 1993 data for the claim that corporations with assets of less than $1 million spent $15.9 billion in tax compliance and yet effectively spent only $4.1 billion to pay taxes, suggesting a huge and inefficient cost of compliance.

A 2015 report by the Wall Street Journal on the cost of tax compliance software estimated an average cost of $817 for Form 1120 and $778 for Form 1120S.

== Employment (payroll) taxes ==
- Form 940, Employer's Annual Federal Unemployment (FUTA) Tax Return
- Form 941, Employer's Quarterly Federal Tax Return
- Form 942, Employer's Quarterly Tax Return for Household Employees (no longer used, replaced by Schedule H of Form 1040 beginning with tax year 1995)
- Form 943, Employer's Annual Federal Tax Return for Agricultural Employees
- Form 944, Employer's Annual Federal Tax Return
- Form 945, Annual Return of Withheld Federal Income Tax (For withholding reported on Forms 1099 and W-2G)

== Transfer taxes ==
- Form 706, United States Estate (and Generation-Skipping Transfer) Tax Return, is used to report estate taxes.
- Form 709, United States Gift (and Generation-Skipping Transfer) Tax Return, is used to report gift taxes.

== Information returns ==
Informational returns are prepared by third parties (employers, banks, financial institutions, etc.) and report information to both the IRS and taxpayers to help them complete their own tax returns. The forms report the amounts only on a calendar year (January 1 through December 31) basis, regardless of the fiscal year used by the payer or payee for other federal tax purposes. Taxpayers are usually not required to attach informational returns to their own federal income tax returns unless the form shows federal income tax withheld.

The issuance or non-issuance of an informational return is not determinative of the tax treatment required of the payee. For example, some income reported on Form 1099 might be nontaxable and some taxable income might not be reported at all. Each payee-taxpayer is legally responsible for reporting the correct amount of total income on his or her own federal income tax return regardless of whether an informational return was filed or received.

=== 1095 series ===
Form 1095 series is used to report health care insurance coverage per the individual health insurance mandate of the Affordable Care Act tax provisions. Each 1095 form lists the primary recipient of the insurance policy along with all the individuals covered under it. The forms also report the period of the coverage, whether the entire year or only certain months.

There are three types of 1095 forms:

- 1095-A: Health Insurance Marketplace Statement, is used to report policies obtained through the health insurance marketplace. This form includes a column listing the monthly advance payments of the premium tax credit, which is used to complete Form 8962 to claim that tax credit.
- 1095-B: Health Coverage, reports policies obtained by health insurance providers.
- 1095-C: Employer-Provided Health Insurance Offer and Coverage, reports health insurance offered by employers with at least 50 full-time employees, per the terms of the employer shared responsibility provisions of the Affordable Care Act. This form is prepared by the employer, and includes information such as whether the employee actually enrolled in the coverage offered, and whether it is self-funded health care. If such an employer provides their coverage through a health insurance company instead of self-funded health care, employees may receive both Form 1095-C from their employer and Form 1095-B separately from that health insurance company.

=== 1098 series ===
- The Form 1098, Mortgage Interest Statement, is used to report interest that a taxpayer has paid on his or her mortgage. Such interest might be tax-deductible as an itemized deduction
- The Form 1098-C, Contributions of Motor Vehicles, Boats, and Airplanes, reports charitable contributions of motor vehicles
- The Form 1098-E, Student Loan Interest Statement, reports interests the taxpayer paid on student loans that might qualify as an adjustment to income
- The Form 1098-F, Fines, Penalties, and Other Amounts, is used by governments or governmental entities to report fines and penalties paid by that entity
- The Form 1098-MA, Mortgage Assistance Payments, is used to report payments on a homeowner's mortgage, which include funds from the HFA Hardest Hit Fund
- The Form 1098-Q, Qualifying Longevity Annuity Contract Information, is used to report issuance of contracts intended to be Qualifying Longevity Annuity Contracts
- The form 1098-T, Tuition Statement, reports either payments received or amounts billed for qualified tuition and related expenses that might entitle the taxpayer for an adjustment to income or a tax credit

=== 1099 series ===
Form 1099 series is used to report various types of income other than wages, salaries, and tips (for which Form W-2 is used instead). Examples of reportable transactions are amounts paid to a non-corporate independent contractor for services (in IRS terminology, such payments are nonemployee compensation). The ubiquity of the form has also led to use of the phrase "1099 workers" or "the 1099 economy" to refer to the independent contractors themselves. In 2011 the requirement has been extended by the Small Business Jobs Act of 2010 to payments made by persons who receive income from rental property.

Each payer must complete a Form 1099 for each covered transaction. Four copies are made: one for the payer, one for the payee, one for the IRS, and one for the State Tax Department, if required. Payers who file 10 or more Form 1099 reports must file all of them electronically with the IRS. If the fewer than 10 requirement is met, and paper copies are filed, the IRS also requires the payer to submit a copy of Form 1096, which is a summary of information forms being sent to the IRS. The returns must be filed with the IRS by the end of February (will change to January starting in 2016) immediately following the year for which the income items or other proceeds are paid. Copies of the returns must be sent to payees, however, by the end of January. The law provides various dollar amounts under which no Form 1099 reporting requirement is imposed. For some Forms 1099, for example, no filing is required for payees who receive less than $600 from the payer during the applicable year.

Variants for Form 1099

As of 2020, several versions of Form 1099 are used, depending on the nature of the income transaction:

- 1099-A: Acquisition or Abandonment of Secured Property
- 1099-B: Proceeds from Broker and Barter Exchange Transactions
- 1099-C: Cancellation of Debt
- 1099-CAP: Changes in Corporate Control and Capital Structure
- 1099-DIV: Dividends and Distributions
- 1099-G: Government Payments
- 1099-H: Health Insurance Advance Payments
- 1099-INT: Interest Income
- 1099-K: Merchant Card and Third Party Network Payments
- 1099-LTC: Long-Term Care Benefits
- 1099-MISC: Miscellaneous Income
- 1099-NEC: Nonemployee Compensation
- 1099-OID: Original Issue Discount
- 1099-PATR: Taxable Distributions Received From Cooperatives
- 1099-Q: Payment from Qualified Education Programs
- 1099-R: Distributions From Pensions, Annuities, Retirement or Profit-Sharing Plans, IRAs, Insurance Contracts, etc.
- 1099-S: Proceeds from Real Estate Transactions
- 1099-SA: Distributions From an HSA, Archer MSA, or Medicare Advantage MSA
- 1042-S: Foreign Person's U.S. Source Income
- SSA-1099: Social Security Benefit Statement
- SSA-1042S: Social Security Benefit Statement to Nonresident Aliens
- RRB-1099: Payments by the Railroad Retirement Board
- RRB-1099R: Pension and Annuity Income by the Railroad Retirement Board
- RRB-1042S: Payments by the Railroad Retirement Board to Nonresident Aliens

=== 5498 Series ===
- Form 5498: IRA Contribution Information
- Form 5498-ESA: Coverdell ESA Contribution Information
- Form 5498-SA: HSA, Archer MSA, or Medicare Advantage MSA Information

=== W series ===
==== W-1 ====
The form W-1, Return of Income Tax Withheld on Wages, was the original form used to report Federal income tax withholding. In 1950, both Form W-1 and Form SS-1, which reported Social Security tax withholding, were replaced by Form 941 which is used by employers to report both income tax withholding and Social Security taxes.

==== W-2 ====
The Form W-2, Wage and Tax Statement, is used to report wages paid to employees and the taxes withheld from them. Employers must complete a Form W-2 for each employee to whom they pay a salary, wage, or other compensation as part of the employment relationship. An employer must mail out the Form W-2 to employees on or before January 31. This deadline gives these taxpayers about 3 months to prepare their returns before the April 15 income tax due date. The form is also used to report FICA taxes to the Social Security Administration. The Form W-2, along with Form W-3, generally must be filed by the employer with the Social Security Administration by the end of February. Relevant amounts on Form W-2 are reported by the Social Security Administration to the Internal Revenue Service. In territories, the W-2 is issued with a two letter code indicating which territory, such as W-2GU for Guam. If corrections are made, it can be done on a W-2c.

==== W-2G ====
The Form W-2G, Gambling Winnings, is used to report Gambling Winnings (direct wager only) to the IRS. It is completed when the winnings are $600.00 or more in any one session and 300 times the buy-in or wager.

==== W-3 ====
The Form W-3 is a summary page of all W-2 forms issued by the employer. It is only used on paper filing of W-2 information. Like the W-2, the W-3c allows for corrections. W-3SS is used for the W-2 territorial returns.

==== W-4 ====
The Form W-4 is used by employers to determine the amount of tax withholding to deduct from employees' wages. The form is not mailed to the IRS but retained by the employer. Tax withholdings depend on employee's personal situation and ideally should be equal to the annual tax due on the Form 1040. When filling out a Form W-4 an employee calculates the number of Form W-4 allowances to claim based on his or her expected tax filing situation for the year. The amount of money withheld as federal income tax is reduced for each Form W-4 allowance taken. No interest is paid on over-withholding, but penalties might be imposed for under-withholding. Alternatively, or in addition, the employee can send quarterly estimated tax payments directly to the IRS (Form 1040-ES). Quarterly estimates may be required if the employee has additional income (e.g. investments or self-employment income) not subject to withholding or insufficiently withheld. There are specialized versions of this form for other types of payment (W-4P for pensions as an example).

==== W-5 ====
The Form W-5 used to be filed by employees with their employer to claim an Advanced Earned Income Tax Credit to be added to their paychecks as an advance on the EITC they would claim when they filed their income tax. The Form has not been used since 2010, the last year that the EITC could be gotten in advance of filing a 1040.

==== W-6 ====
The Form W-6 was used beginning July 1, 1983 to assert that a taxpayer qualified for exemption from a then newly required withholding of 10% on interest and dividends. When withholding was no longer required on interest or dividends, the form was no longer used.

==== W-7 ====
The Form W-7 and related documents are the application for IRS Individual Taxpayer Identification Number (ITIN). This number is used to identify taxpayers who do not qualify for a social security number.

==== W-8 Series ====
The Form W-8BEN, Certificate of Foreign Status of Beneficial Owner for United States Tax Withholding, is used by foreign persons (including corporations) to certify their non-US status. The form establishes that one is a non-resident alien or foreign corporation, to avoid or reduce tax withholding from US source income, such as rents from US property, interest on US bank deposits or dividends paid by US corporations. The form is not used for US wages and salaries earned by non-resident aliens (in which case Form W-4 is used), or for US freelance (dependent personal services) income (in which case Form 8233 is used). The form requires the foreign person to provide a US Taxpayer Identification Number unless the US income is dividends or interest from actively traded or similar investments. Other W-forms handle other international issues. The IRS released a new version of W-8BEN in February 2014 that required corporations to sign a W-8BEN-E form instead.

==== W-9 ====
Form W-9, 2024

The Form W-9, Request for Taxpayer Identification Number and Certification, serves two purposes. First, it is used by third parties to collect identifying information to help file information returns with the IRS. It requests the name, address, and taxpayer identification information of a taxpayer (in the form of a Social Security Number or Employer Identification Number). The form is never actually sent to the IRS, but is maintained by the person who files the information return for verification purposes. The information on the Form W-9 and the payment made are reported on a Form 1099. The second purpose is to help the payee avoid backup withholding. The payer must collect withholding taxes on certain reportable payments for the IRS. However, if the payee certifies on the W-9 they are not subject to backup withholding they generally receive the full payment due them from the payer. This is similar to the withholding exemptions certifications found on Form W-4 for employees.

==== W-10 ====
The Form W-10, Dependent care provider identification, is a way for day care service providers to provide information to the individual so they can take credits for care of their children. This form is frequently replaced with a freeform statement indicating the Tax ID of the day care or individual and how much is paid.

==== W-11 ====
The Form W-11, Hiring Incentives to Restore Employment (HIRE) Act Employee Affidavit, is to certify that a new employee was previously unemployed in order to qualify for a tax credit in accordance with the HIRE act.

==== W-12 ====
The form W-12 is a form for tax preparation professionals to apply for their ID Number. It is being phased out in favor of an electronic application.

== Other forms ==
Form 2553, 2017

- Form 2553, Election by a Small Business Corporation, is used by small businesses to elect to be taxed as a "Subchapter S – Corporation" (S corporation).
- Form 2555, Foreign Earned Income, is filed by taxpayers who have earned income from sources outside the United States exempt from US income tax. US citizens or resident aliens are taxed on their worldwide income. For those who qualify, however, Form 2555 can be used to exclude foreign earned income up to (In USD):

- $87,500 for 2007
- $87,600 for 2008
- $91,400 for 2009
- $91,500 for 2010
- $92,900 for 2011
- $95,100 for 2012
- $97,600 for 2013
- $99,200 for 2014
- $100,800 for 2015
- $101,300 for 2016

Also, it can be used to claim a housing exclusion or deduction. A filer cannot exclude or deduct more than their foreign earned income for the tax year.

- Form 4868, Application for Automatic Extension of Time To File US Individual Income Tax Return, is used to request an extension of time to file a federal income tax return for an individual (there is no extension to pay the tax).
- Form 8812 The Additional child tax credit is a refundable tax credit.
- Form 8822, Change of Address, is used to report a change of address to the Internal Revenue Service.
- Form 8850, Pre-Screening Notice and Certification Request for the Work Opportunity Credit, is used in implementation of the federal government's Work Opportunity Tax Credit program.
- Form 8889, Health Savings Accounts (HSAs), is used by Health Savings Account HSA holders. HSA administrators are required to send HSA account holders and file forms 1099SA and 5498SA with the IRS each year.
- Form 8917 Tuition and fees deduction.
- Form 8936 Qualified Plug-In Electric Drive Motor Vehicle Credit
- Form 8962 The Premium tax credit is a refundable tax credit is used in conduction with healthcare subsidies offered for individuals and families participating in a healthcare exchange. Health exchanges send participants a form 1095-A each year.

== Public disclosure ==
In the United States, tax records are not publicly available, with the exception of Forms 990 and 1023 for nonprofit organizations, which are generally open for public inspection. Selected tax data is released as economic data for research. In other countries such as Norway and Finland, tax records are public information. Tax filings in the US were not private when federal income taxation began in 1861, but controversy led to Congress prohibiting any examination of tax records by 1894. Congress allowed public examination of individual and corporate tax payments only in 1923, but the disclosure was eliminated by 1924. In 1934 the measure was briefly considered again. As of 2010, various experts have advocated that the income and tax payments be released for individuals and corporations to shed further light on tax efficiency and spur reform. These experts have suggested only releasing information that cannot be used for identity theft to address privacy concerns.

== See also ==
- IRS e-file
- IRS Volunteer Income Tax Assistance Program
- Taxation in the United States
