= WorkingPoint =

Business Management Application

- Company type: Privately held
- Industry: Internet, Software
- Founded: 2007
- Headquarters: San Francisco, California, USA
- Key people: Tate Holt, CEO; Tom Proulx, Chairman
- Products: Small Business Management Software
- Number of employees: About 10
- Website: www.workingpoint.com

WorkingPoint is a web-based application that provides a suite of small business management tools. It is designed to serve as a single point of access for various business operations, featuring a user-friendly interface. WorkingPoint's functionalities include double-entry bookkeeping, contact management, inventory management, invoicing, and bill and expense management.

== Company ==
WorkingPoint, formerly Netbooks Inc, is a privately held corporation based in San Francisco, CA. The company is backed by CMEA Capital, also based in San Francisco. WorkingPoint has about ten employees and is led by CEO Tate Holt and Chairman Tom Proulx. Proulx is a co-founder of Intuit and an original author of that company’s Quicken personal finance software.

The company was founded in 2007 under its original name Netbooks by co-creator Ridgely Evers. Evers set out to design a product that was more user-friendly than Intuit’s Quickbooks, which he also co-created. In mid-2009 the company officially rebranded itself and its flagship product “WorkingPoint”. The purpose of the re-branding was to disassociate the company from the product category of small laptops also known as netbooks.

== Social Media Presence ==
WorkingPoint maintains a daily blog geared toward small business owners and managers. Each week the blog is updated with 3 WorkingPoint product feature or “how-to” posts, 2 subscriber company profiles, and 2 small business coaching posts. The company also maintains a Twitter page and a Facebook page.

== Product Description (Free Version) ==
WorkingPoint allows businesses to invoice up to five customers (repeatedly) and provides account access for up to two individual users free of charge.

Online Invoicing

WorkingPoint allows users to create customized quotes and invoices online. The invoices can be used to bill customers via email or hardcopy post. WorkingPoint compiles the info from these invoices so users can track customer payments, inventory costs, shipping charges, accounts receivable and sales taxes. Users can also manage customer overpayments, provide customer loyalty discounts, and view a customer invoice history.

Bill & Expense Management

Users can track their bills and expenses by entering info into the WorkingPoint interface. WorkingPoint compiles this info so users can track categorized expenses, accounts paid, accounts payable, and vendor purchase history. The interface also allows users to add to their inventory while entering billing info.

Double-Entry Bookeeping

WorkingPoint automatically records entries under the double-entry bookkeeping system (also known as debits and credits) when the user completes invoicing and expense forms. Users can view transactions in general ledger format and perform closing entries if necessary. This functionality is designed for users who do not have an accounting background.

Business Contact Management

WorkingPoint provides an interface for users to manage their customer and vendor contact info. The software automatically tracks the user’s relationship with contacts, so users can track a contact’s sales and purchase history. Contacts can be imported and exported via numerous email clients including Microsoft Outlook, Yahoo! Mail, Google Gmail, and Mac Address Book.

Inventory Management

The software automatically adjusts inventory quantities after every purchase and sale. Users can track their current inventory quantity, average cost of inventory on-hand, cost of goods sold (COGS) and top-selling products. Users can also make manual adjustments to inventory when necessary.

Financial Reporting

Users can view a balance sheet, income statement, or cash flow statement pertaining to their business. The software automatically manages accruals to produce the balance sheet and income statement. Users can choose a data range from which to draw any of these reports. Financial reports can be converted to pdf format or exported (with formulas intact) to OpenOffice or Microsoft Excel.

Cash Management

WorkingPoint enables users to monitor cash balances on their bank accounts. The software automatically tracks cash inflows and outflows when users manage their accounts payable and accounts receivable.

Business Dashboard

The Business Dashboard visually and graphically displays key real-time business data. Users can customize the Dashboard to display data of their choosing.

Online Company Profile

Users can create an online company profile in order to have a presence on the Internet and as a basis for participation in WorkingPoint’s small business community features. Public profiles are featured in the WorkingPoint Company Directory and can be viewed externally using the URL format: https://businessname.workingpoint.com.

== Product Description (Premium Version) ==
The premium version of WorkingPoint costs $10 per month. It includes all of the functionalities of the free version, allowing unlimited invoicing and account access. It also offers the following functions: 1099 Tax Reporting, invoice payment collection via PayPal, Email Marketing via VerticalResponse, and the Premium Reports & Accounting Package.

1099 Tax Reporting

Users can identify qualifying companies and individuals for IRS Form 1099 or IRS Form 1096 reporting. WorkingPoint automatically tracks payments made to these companies and individuals. Users can then generate 1099 reports for distribution.

Premium Reports & Accounting Package

This includes: a Daily Operating Report providing users with sales and cash flow information, customizable accounts categorization, and cash flow statements using the indirect method of reporting.

Invoice Payment Collection via PayPal

Users can collect payment on their invoices via PayPal.

Email Marketing via VerticalResponse

The WorkingPoint premium package includes 500 email credits with the email marketing firm VerticalResponse.
