= Form 1099-DA =

Tax form

Form 1099-DA (officially titled "Digital Asset Proceeds From Broker Transactions") is an Internal Revenue Service (IRS) tax form used to report the sale or exchange of digital assets, such as cryptocurrency, stablecoins, and non-fungible tokens (NFTs). Introduced for the 2025 tax year, it represents the first standardized information return specifically dedicated to digital asset transactions, bringing reporting requirements for digital brokers in line with those of traditional financial institutions.

== Background ==
The creation of Form 1099-DA was mandated by the Infrastructure Investment and Jobs Act of 2021, which amended Internal Revenue Code Section 6045 to expand the definition of a "broker" to include persons who regularly provide services effectuating transfers of digital assets. Previously, cryptocurrency transactions were reported inconsistently, often on Form 1099-B or Form 1099-MISC, or not reported by third parties at all, leading to significant challenges in tax compliance.

Following the passage of the act, the IRS issued proposed regulations in August 2023. After reviewing over 44,000 public comments, the final regulations (T.D. 10000) were released on June 28, 2024.

== Reporting requirements ==
The reporting requirements for Form 1099-DA apply to custodial brokers, including centralized cryptocurrency exchanges (such as Coinbase or Kraken), hosted cryptocurrency wallet providers, and digital asset payment processors. Decentralized exchanges (DEXs) and non-custodial wallet providers were temporarily exempted from the initial rollout of these regulations.

=== Implementation timeline ===
- Tax Year 2025: Brokers must report gross proceeds from sales or dispositions. Reporting of cost basis is optional for this year.
- Tax Year 2026: Brokers are required to report both gross proceeds and cost basis for covered securities (digital assets acquired on or after January 1, 2026, and held in the broker's custody).

=== Scope of transactions ===
A Form 1099-DA is triggered in years when a taxpayer:

- sells digital assets for cash (fiat currency),
- exchanges one digital asset for another,
- uses digital assets to pay for goods or services, or
- receives payment for real estate transactions in digital assets.

== Usage ==
Taxpayers receive a Form 1099-DA by mid-February of the year following the transaction year. The information on the form is used to complete Form 8949 (Sales and Other Dispositions of Capital Assets), which then flows into Schedule D to determine the final capital gain or loss.

Because cost basis reporting is not mandatory for such assets acquired before 2026 (non-covered securities), taxpayers often need to reconcile their 1099-DA with their own records to ensure they do not overpay taxes on the full gross proceeds reported by the broker.
