= Form 1096 =

IRS tax form

Form 1096 (officially the "Annual Summary and Transmittal of U.S. Information Returns") is an Internal Revenue Service (IRS) tax form used in the United States used to summarize information returns being sent to the IRS. Information returns are sent by the issuer to recipients as well as the IRS, but Form 1096 is not sent to the recipients. Instead, it is only sent to the IRS.

== Paper versus electronic filing ==
Form 1096 is only used if one is physically filing the accompanying forms with the IRS. If one files the accompanying forms electronically, then Form 1096 is not required.

When more than 250 information returns (e.g. Forms 1042-S, 1098, 1099) of a single type are filed for the calendar year, one is required to file all forms of that type electronically with the IRS, in which case Form 1096 is not used for that type.

== Requirements ==
Each type of form must be sent with a separate Form 1096. For the purpose of filing Form 1096, variants of certain forms are treated as separate types. For instance with Form 1099, each variant (such as Form 1099-MISC and Form 1099-K) is treated as a different form. In box 6 on Form 1096, only one box should have an "X" mark in it. Even if only one instance of each form was prepared, Form 1096 must be used.

Form 1096 has two separate due dates to the IRS depending on the type of form accompanying the 1096. Form 1096 is due by the end of February each year when used for Forms 1097, 1098, 1099, 3921, 3922 or W-2G, and is due by the end of May when used for Forms 5498.

For Form W-2, Form W-3 is used instead of Form 1096.
