= Form 1023 =

IRS form for nonprofit organizations

Form 1023 is a United States IRS tax form, also known as the Application for Recognition of Exemption Under 501(c)(3) of the Internal Revenue Code. It is filed by nonprofits to get exemption status. On January 31, 2020, the IRS abandoned the paper format of the form 1023. Those who used the paper version were given 90 days grace period and that ended on April 30, 2020. Going forward, every application has to be filed online through Pay.gov portal.

== Eligibility ==
- The IRS specifies certain types of organizations that are exempt from federal income tax. The most common types are charitable, religious and educational organizations, civic associations, labor organizations, business leagues, social clubs, fraternal organizations, and veterans’ organizations.

The following organizations are eligible to file Form 1023 under section 501(c)(3) of the Internal Revenue Code:

- Religious or charitable organizations
- Scientific organizations and organizations that test for public safety
- Literary or educational organizations
- National or international amateur sports competitors
- Organizations created to prevent cruelty to children or animals

However, the IRS allows certain groups to be automatically exempt from filing Form 1023, yet still eligible to be classified as a 501(c)(3) organization:

- Churches, their integrated auxiliaries, and conventions or associations of churches
- Organizations that are not private foundations and that have gross receipts that normally are not more than $5,000

Furthermore, to qualify for tax-exempt status, the organization must be:

- Organized as a corporation, LLC, (Note: An LLC will not qualify for tax-exempt status if it has either private shareholders or individuals who are members. An LLC with only tax-exempt members might qualify for tax-exempt status.) trust, or unincorporated association with organization documents limiting the organization's reach permanently to the purpose it's filing the form for.
- Operated to further the purposes laid out in its organization documents, and:
  - Refrain from participating in political campaigns or promoting legislative activity
  - Ensure that its assets and earnings don't unjustly benefit board members, officers, or other key members of the organization
  - Refrain from promoting private or non-tax-exempt purposes more than insubstantially
  - Not engage in illegal activities or violate fundamental public policy

Tax-exempt organizations may file Form 5768 to influence legislative activity.

== Filing requirements ==
Form 1023 requires the following information about an applying charity:

- Date of organization's creation and what country it was created under
- Organizational structure
- Organizing documents (e.g. articles of incorporation, trust agreement, articles of association)
- Description of organization's past, present, and future activities
- Compensation of the organization's officers, directors, trustees, employees, and independent contractors
- Other members and individuals receiving benefits
- Organization's history, including whether the organization is the successor of another
- Specific activities as outlined in the form, including any fundraisers
- Financial data for the past four years

Form 1023 Application user fee for the long form is $600, and the Form 1023-EZ is $275 respectively.

== Form 1023-EZ ==
Form 1023-EZ is a streamlined version of Form 1023; it was introduced in 2014 because the original Form 1023 can take over nine hours to complete, and many organizations were waiting over a year for review. About 52% of all organizations filed Form 1023-EZ, with an average turnaround time of 9 days. Of the organizations submitted, 95% of them were approved for charity status.

=== Requirements ===
Organizations applying for tax-exempt status through Form 1023-EZ can apply online at Pay.gov if they meet the following requirements:

- Gross receipts in each of the past three years and projected next three years are below $50,000
- Total assets are less than $250,000
- The organization was created under United States law and its mailing address is within the United States
- The organization is not a successor to, or controlled by, an entity suspended as a terrorist organization as defined by section 501(p)
- Are organized as a corporation, unincorporated association, or trust
- Not a successor of a for-profit entity
- Not a revoked or previously revoked organization
- Not a church (or other place of worship), church association, school, college, university, hospital, medical research organization, HMO, ACO or organization participating in ACO activities, organized and operated exclusively for public safety testing,
- Are not applying for an exemption as a cooperative hospital service organization, cooperative service organization of operating educational organizations or qualified charitable risk pool
- Are not requesting application as a supporting organization or private operating foundation
- Do not offer credit counseling as the main service, invest more than 5% of assets in non-public trading, or offer carbon credits or carbon offsets
- Do not maintain or intend to maintain one or more donor-advised funds

Organizations that do not fall under these requirements may still file the original Form 1023.

=== History ===
Form 1023-EZ was created when the National Taxpayer Advocate suggested simplifying the form in 2011, and the IRS eventually followed that advice in 2013. The form was finally introduced in July 2014. While the majority of charities will file through Form 1023-EZ, the move to simplify it wasn't without its criticisms. As Form 1023-EZ doesn't require a list of charity activities or supporting documentation, those activities will go unknown to the IRS, and there is no protection against uncharitable organizations filing the form for tax exemption status. In the 2015 Annual Report, the IRS reported an audit on Form 1023-EZ revealing that 2 in 5 charities that filed Form 1023-EZ would not qualify for charity status if they had gone through the full Form 1023. Furthermore, in 2016, the application fee for Form 1023-EZ had been reduced from $400 to $275.

== See also ==
- Form 990
