= Form 1099-MISC =

IRS tax form

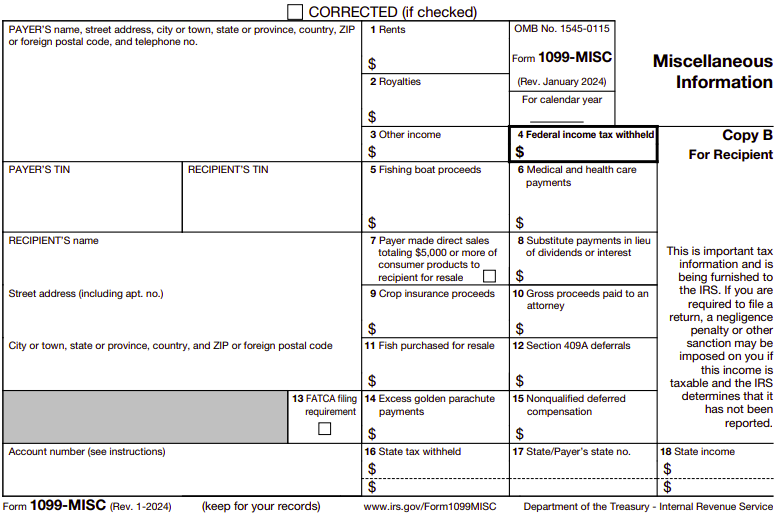
Form 1099-MISC, revised January 2024

In the United States, Form 1099-MISC is a variant of Form 1099 used to report miscellaneous income. One notable use of Form 1099-MISC was to report amounts paid by a business (including nonprofits) to a non-corporate US resident independent contractor for services (in IRS terminology, such payments are nonemployee compensation), but starting tax year 2020, this use was moved to the separate Form 1099-NEC. The ubiquity of the form has also led to use of the phrase "1099 workers" or "the 1099 economy" to refer to the independent contractors themselves. Other uses of Form 1099-MISC include rental income, royalties, and Native American gaming profits.

The form is issued by the payer (e.g. business) and is due to the recipient (e.g. contractor) by January 31 and to the IRS by the last day of February each year for work done during the previous tax year. If the payer is registered to file electronically with the IRS the deadline for filing with the IRS is March 31. In accordance with the PATH Act, these deadlines will be changing so the mailing and transmittal are both January 31 moving forward starting with Tax Year 2016.

== Use cases ==
There are several use cases of Form 1099-MISC. Whether an income is taxable and whether it should be reported on Form 1099-MISC are distinct questions. There may be other forms, such as Form W-2 (for wages) or Form 1099-K (for payments made with a credit card) that must be filed instead.

=== Business–contractor arrangement ===
One common use of Form 1099-MISC was to report payments by a business to US resident independent contractors before the reintroduction of Form 1099-NEC in tax year 2020. For the purpose of this form, "business" includes nonprofits and other organizations. In this case Form 1099-MISC needs to be issued only when the total amount paid during the tax year is at least $600, though the Form may still be issued at lower amounts. This is the case even if individual payment amounts are all less than $600. However, since Form 1099-MISC only concerns payments made to an individual as an independent contractor, if an individual becomes an employee later (see below), the $600 threshold need be met only for part of work done as an independent contractor.

In a business–contractor arrangement, the following must apply:

- Payer must be a business and not a private individual; personal payments should not be reported using this form.
- Payee must not be a business or employee (so must be a contract worker). Employee payments are covered by Form W-2.
- In general, payment must be in exchange for services rendered, although there are exceptions like oil and gas payments.

It is possible for a payee to start as a contractor and later become an employee. It is also possible for a payee to maintain two jobs—one as a contractor and the other as an employee—under the same payer. In these cases, the payee can receive both Form 1099-MISC and Form W-2.

=== Other use cases ===
Other uses of Form 1099-MISC include rental income, royalties, and Native American gaming profits.

=== Payments made through third-party networks ===
When payments are made through third-party networks, filing Form 1099-MISC is not required. Instead, Form 1099-K will be filed by the payment service.

=== Nonresident payee ===
A major difference exists for personal payments when the payee is a nonresident for tax purposes (including undocumented alien). In this case, Form 1042-S is usually issued in place of Form 1099-MISC. However, there are a few key differences:

- Form 1099-MISC usually do not require any withholding, except in cases where the payee does not provide a correct Taxpayer Identification Number (TIN), the payee has been reported for underpayment, or there has been a payee certification failure. In contrast, Form 1042-S is accompanied by tax withholding.
- Form 1099-MISC needs to be filed only if $600 or more is being paid. However, Form 1042-S needs to be filed for any payment.
- In case of payment for personal services (i.e., payment for services that fall outside a business−contractor arrangement, such as payment for household help), no Form 1099-MISC needs to be issued if the payee is a resident alien, but Form 1042-S must be issued in the case of nonresident payees.
- Form 1099-Misc needs to be provided for Royalties of $10 or more.

== Significance for payer ==
=== Liability ===
If the payer does not file Form 1099-MISC, there is a maximum penalty of $250 per form not filed, up to $500,000 per year. Otherwise for late filings the penalty varies from $30 to $100, depending on how late the filing was.

=== Relation with payer's tax filing ===
There is no precise match between total amount paid from Form 1099-MISCs issued and any line item in the profit/loss report, because of the constraint of not reporting money paid when the amount to an individual is less than $600. However, IRS may get suspicious if the profit/loss report suggests a large amount of money paid to independent contractors but few or no Form 1099-MISCs reported.

== Significance for payee ==
As part of their tax return, independent contractor payees will usually complete a Schedule C (amount from Schedule C will go on line 12 of Form 1040), and Schedule SE (amount from Schedule SE will affect Lines 27 and 57 of Form 1040, and in particular will influence the calculation of Social Security and Medicare taxes).

Payees receiving Form 1099-MISC for rents and royalties usually need to fill Schedule E (amount from this will go to line 17 of Form 1040).

Since the IRS receives Form 1099-MISCs from the payer, if the payee reports a smaller total than the sum of Form 1099-MISCs, the IRS can get suspicious. However, the sum of Form 1099-MISC amounts may not cover all of the payee's income as an independent contractor (due to payers who do not issue the form because of the $600 threshold or because of tax error on the payer's part, and also due to personal payments, which are not reportable on Form 1099-MISC). The payee still has a responsibility to pay taxes for the total amount.

=== Liability ===
There is a penalty to the payee for not paying income tax for the income referenced by Form 1099-MISC. The penalty is up to 20% of the underpayment.

=== Withholding and estimated tax payment ===
Form 1099 need not be attached to the payee's tax return if no tax was withheld. In general, payer-sent forms are used to substantiate claims of withholding, so only forms that involve withholding need to be attached.

In almost all cases, income associated with Form 1099-MISC is not subject to withholding. However, income from class II or class III gaming as an Indian tribal member must be withheld.

Withholding requirements are different for nonresident payees, in which case Form 1042-S is used instead.

Individuals whose income is primarily from Form 1099-MISC therefore need to send estimated tax payments through the Electronic Federal Tax Payment System (EFTPS) or by paper-filing Form 1040-ES with a check.

Even those who do not need to pay income tax may still owe some social security or Medicare taxes. So very low-income individuals who are self-employed may need to file returns whereas comparable individuals who work as an employee (whose income is withheld) may not.

== History ==
In 1918, Form 1099 was created by the Internal Revenue Service for use with the 1917 tax year. At the time, employers were required to use the form to report salaries paid in excess of $800.

== Relation to Form 1099-K ==
Form 1099-K "Payment Card and Third Party Network Transactions" is a variant of Form 1099 used to report payments received through reportable payment card transactions (such as debit, credit, or stored-value cards) or settlement of third-party payment network transactions. Form 1099-K is sent out to payees by a payment settlement entity (such as a bank) if there are more than 200 such transactions and the gross payments exceed $20,000.

The instructions for Form 1099-MISC include a provision that says payments made with payment cards or third-party network transactions must be reported on Form 1099-K by the payment settlement entity, and that the payer does not need to issue a Form 1099-MISC in this case.

This provision creates a tax loophole. Before Form 1099-K existed, payment card transactions or settlement of third-party payment network transactions totaling at least $600 required the payer to file a Form 1099-MISC. However, with this provision, a party getting paid through payment card or third-party payment network transactions, seeking to avoid paying taxes, can simply opt to avoid meeting either or both the 200 transaction and $20,000 minimum threshold needed to file Form 1099-K. Even if a party does not seek to avoid paying taxes, if they fail to meet either threshold criteria for filing Form 1099-K, they simply may receive neither a Form 1099-K from the payment settlement entity nor a Form 1099-MISC from the payer. As of 2016 this remains a problem.

Even with this provision, many payers still choose to file Form 1099-MISC. This means that if the payee meets the minimum threshold for receiving Form 1099-K, they may actually receive both Form 1099-MISC and Form 1099-K and possibly over-report their payments. In any case, this provision necessitates tracking payments separately.

== See also ==
- Form 1040
- IRS tax forms
- Taxation in the United States
- Independent contractor-employee distinction in the United States
