= Form 1042 =

IRS tax forms

Form 1042-S, 2016.

Forms 1042, 1042-S and 1042-T are United States Internal Revenue Service tax forms dealing with payments to foreign persons, including nonresident aliens, foreign partnerships, foreign corporations, foreign estates, and foreign trusts.

Every withholding agent or intermediary, whether US or foreign, who has control, receipt, custody, disposal or payment of any fixed or determinable, annual or periodic US source income over foreign persons, must file these forms with the IRS. For example, employers that employ nonresident aliens (such as foreign workers or foreign students) need to file a 1042-S Form with the IRS for every nonresident alien they employ and also send a (completed) copy of that form to the nonresident alien.

Forms 1042 and 1042-S are filed separately. The main difference between forms 1042 and 1042-S is that form 1042-S is concerned with payments made to foreign persons, while form 1042 is concerned with determining how much income will be withheld for tax withholding purposes. Also, Form 1042-S must always be filed together with Form 1042-T, but Form 1042 can be filed by itself.

== Filing ==
=== When are the forms due? ===
Forms 1042, 1042-S and 1042-T are due to be filed by March 15 of the year following the calendar year in which the income subject to reporting was paid. If the due date falls on a Saturday, Sunday, or legal holiday, the due date is the next business day. These forms should be addressed to Ogden Service Center, P.O. BOX 409101, Ogden, UT 84409.

=== Penalties ===
If Form 1042 and/or Form 1042-S are filed late, or the tax is not paid or deposited when due, the filer may be liable for penalties, unless they show that the failure to file or pay was due to reasonable cause and not willful neglect.

== Form 1042 ==
Form 1042, also "Annual Withholding Tax Return for U.S. Source Income of Foreign Persons", is used to report tax withheld on certain income of foreign persons.

The employer only needs to submit Form 1042 to the IRS, not to their employee. Form 1042 does not have to be accompanied by a Form 1042-T.

== Form 1042-S ==
Form 1042-S, also "Foreign Person's U.S. Source Income Subject to Withholding", is used to report any payments made to foreign persons.

Non-resident alien employees receive a completed version of this form from their withholding agent if they have one. For example, a postdoctoral student from a foreign country who receives a stipend from an American university would receive Form 1042-S from the university, but if the person is receiving payment in exchange for work done (such as teaching duties), this would be reported on a Form W-2. It is possible for the same person to receive both forms in a given calendar year if the person's income comes from both types of sources.

Note that a separate Form 1042-S must be filed for each type of income paid to the same recipient.

If an employer needs to file 250 or more of Form 1042-S, then each Form 1042-S must be filed electronically with the IRS (though paper copies may still be given to the workers).

=== Withholding ===
Form 1042-S payments are subject to withholding. The withholding level is:

- 14% for scholarships/fellowships if the payee is in F, J, M, or Q status and has a valid Taxpayer Identification Number,
- 30% otherwise.

=== Comparison with Forms 1099 and 1099-MISC ===
Form 1099 is one of several IRS tax forms used to prepare and file an information return to report various types of income other than wages, salaries, and tips (for which Form W-2 is used instead). Form 1099-MISC is a variant of Form 1099 used to report miscellaneous income. As a general rule, if the person receiving the withholdable payment is a nonresident alien, Forms 1099 and 1099-MISC should not be used, and instead Form 1042-S should be used.

One use of Form 1099 is for reporting gross rent on property. However, for example, if a property manager manages property owned by nonresident aliens, the manager must issue the nonresident alien owner a Form 1042-S, not a Form 1099.

A common use of Form 1099-MISC is to report amounts paid by a business to a non-corporate US resident independent contractor for services. If the independent contractor is a nonresident alien, then the business must instead use Form 1042-S.

Form 1042 is not merely the nonresident payee analogue of Form 1099. There are a few important differences:

1. Forms 1099 and 1099-MISC usually do not require any withholding, except in cases where the payee does not provide a correct Taxpayer Identification Number (TIN), the payee has been reported for underpayment, or there has been a payee certification failure. In contrast, Form 1042-S is accompanied by tax withholding.
2. The various Form 1099s have reporting thresholds (for instance, Form 1099-MISC needs to be filed only if $600 or more is being paid). However, Form 1042-S needs to be filed for any payment.
3. There are contexts where no Form 1099 (or any other form) needs to be filed for resident payees, but Form 1042-S needs to be filed for nonresident payees. These include scholarship income, as well as payment for personal services (i.e. payment for services that fall outside a business−contractor arrangement, such as payment for household help).

=== Comparison with Form W-2 ===
Form W-2 is issued for work done as an employee to all US citizens and residents and is issued to foreign employees who either do not fall under a tax treaty, or whose earnings exceed allowable maximums of a tax treaty.

== Form 1042-T ==
Form 1042-T, also "Annual Summary and Transmittal of Forms 1042-S", is used to transmit Form 1042-S to the Internal Revenue Service. Form 1042-T is simply a 1-page summary of Form 1042-S. This form (along with Form 1042-S) is submitted to the IRS only, not to the non-resident alien. A separate Form 1042-T must accompany each type of Form 1042-S, but multiple Forms 1042-S (corresponding to more than one payee) can be grouped under a single Form 1042-T.

== See also ==
- IRS tax forms
- Taxation in the United States
