= Form 1099-OID =

IRS tax form

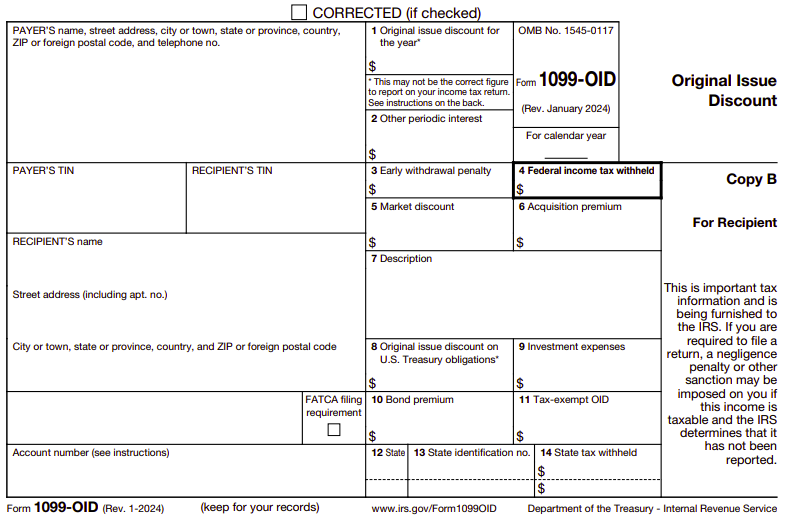
Form 1099-OID, revised January 2024

In the United States, a Form 1099-OID is a tax form intended to be submitted to the Internal Revenue Service by the holder of debt instruments (such as bonds, notes, or certificates) which were discounted at purchase to report the taxable difference between the instruments' actual value and the discounted purchase price. Like other 1099 forms, it is normally filled out by a payer of income—for example, the issuer or seller of a discounted bond—and sent to tax authorities and the income recipient.

== Fraudulent use ==
1099-OID fraud involves filing Form 1099-OID with false withholding information to reduce taxable income. Promoters of the fraud allege that the withheld amount exists in a secret bank account, a claim that originates from the redemption movement. The IRS has taken notice of 1099-OID fraud schemes and has successfully brought legal action against them.
