= Form 1099-K =

IRS tax form

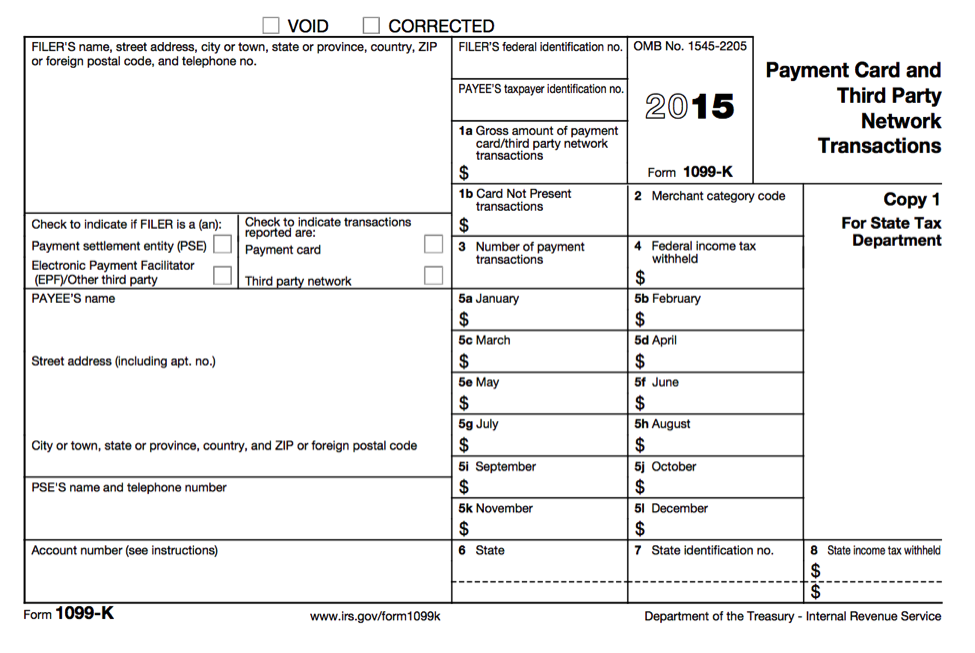
Form 1099-K, 2015

In the United States, Form 1099-K "Payment Card and Third Party Network Transactions" is a variant of Form 1099 used to report payments received through reportable payment card transactions (such as debit, credit, or stored-value cards) and/or settlement of third-party payment network transactions. Form 1099-K is sent out to payees by a payment settlement entity (such as a bank) if the gross payments exceed $600. Reportable payment card transactions do not include ATM withdrawals or checks issued in connection with a payment card.

Examples of individuals who would receive Form 1099-K include freelancers compensated via PayPal, Etsy sellers, Uber drivers who accept credit cards as payment, small businesses who accept card transactions as payment, and in general professionals who accept online or credit card payments for services.

== Motivation ==
In 2006, Americans underpaid their taxes by $450 billion, equal to a 17% tax noncompliance rate. In response, the IRS has pushed for more third party information reporting.

In the Housing and Economic Recovery Act of 2008, a new requirement was laid out for banks and credit card merchants to report payments to the IRS. This requirement took effect in 2011, and Form 1099-K was first issued in 2012. It uses third party information reporting (banks and credit card merchants) in order to increase tax compliance and improve IRS tax assessments. The new requirement specifically does much in the way of increasing tax compliance from independent contractors, especially with the increasing size of the so-called "1099 economy".

== Filing ==
Payment settlement entities must send Form 1099-K to the IRS by the last day of February of the year following the relevant transactions, or if filing electronically, by April 1. Form 1099-K may be filed electronically through the Filing Information Returns Electronically (FIRE) system. If a payment settlement entity has more than 250 individual information returns to file in any calendar year, they all must be submitted electronically.

== Relation to Form 1099-MISC ==
Form 1099-MISC is a variant of Form 1099 used to report miscellaneous income. One common use of Form 1099-MISC is to report payments by a business to US resident independent contractors. In this case Form 1099-MISC needs to be issued only when the total amount paid during the tax year is at least $600. However, the instructions for Form 1099-MISC include a provision that says payments made with payment cards and/or third party network transactions must be reported on Form 1099-K by the payment settlement entity, and that the payer does not need to issue a Form 1099-MISC in this case.

This provision creates a tax loophole. Before Form 1099-K existed, payment card transactions and/or settlement of third-party payment network transactions totaling at least $600 required the payer to file a Form 1099-MISC. However, with this provision, a party getting paid through payment card and/or third-party payment network transactions, seeking to avoid paying taxes, can simply opt to avoid meeting either the 200 transaction or $20,000 minimum threshold needed to file Form 1099-K. Even if a party doesn't seek to avoid paying taxes, if they don't meet either threshold criteria for filing Form 1099-K, they simply may receive neither a Form 1099-K from the payment settlement entity nor a Form 1099-MISC from the payer. As of 2022, this was changed to match 1099-MISC requirements.

Even with this provision, many payers still choose to file Form 1099-MISC. This means that if the payee meets the minimum threshold for receiving Form 1099-K, they may actually receive both Form 1099-MISC and Form 1099-K and possibly over-report their payments. In any case, this provision necessitates tracking payments separately.

Form 1099-K is sent not only to individuals, but also corporations and tax-exempt entities.

== See also ==
- IRS Tax Forms
- Tax evasion in the United States
- Taxation in the United States
