= Form 1040 =

IRS tax form

U.S. Individual Income Tax Return Form 1040 for fiscal year 2024

Form 1040, officially titled the U.S. Individual Income Tax Return, is an IRS tax form used by United States residents to file personal federal income tax returns. The form is used to calculate a taxpayer's total taxable income and to determine the amount of tax owed to or refundable from the federal government.

For individual taxpayers who follow the calendar year, income tax returns are generally due by Tax Day, which typically falls on April 15 of the following year. If April 15 falls on a Saturday, Sunday, or legal holiday, the due date is extended to the next business day. Taxpayers may obtain an automatic extension to file Form 1040 until October 15 by submitting Form 4868. However, this extension applies only to the filing deadline; any taxes owed must still be paid by the original due date to avoid penalties and interest.

Form 1040 consists of two pages (23 lines in total), not counting attachments. The first page collects information about the taxpayer(s) and dependents. In particular, the taxpayer's filing status is reported on this page. The second page reports income, calculates the allowable deductions and credits, figures the tax due given adjusted income, and applies funds already withheld from wages or estimated payments made towards tax liability. On the right side of the first page is the presidential election campaign fund checkoff, which allows individuals to designate that the federal government give $3 of the tax it receives to the presidential election campaign fund. Altogether, 142 million individual income tax returns were filed for the tax year 2018 (filing season 2019), 92% of which were filed electronically.

== Filing requirements ==
=== Who must file? ===
Form 1040 (or a variant thereof) is the main tax form filed by individuals who are deemed residents of the United States for tax purposes. The corresponding main form filed by businesses is Form 1120, also called the U.S. Corporation Income Tax Return.

An individual is considered a resident of the United States for tax purposes if he or she is a citizen of the United States or a resident alien of the United States for tax purposes. An individual is a resident alien of the United States if he or she passes either the Substantial Presence Test or the Green Card Test, although there are also some other cases; individuals who have taxable income in the United States but fail the criteria for being resident aliens must file as nonresident aliens for tax purposes. While residents of the United States for tax purposes file Form 1040, nonresident aliens must file Form 1040NR or 1040NR-EZ. There is also a "dual status alien" for aliens whose status changed during the year.

Resident aliens of the United States for tax purposes must generally file if their income crosses a threshold where their taxable income is likely to be positive, but there are many other cases where it may be legally desirable to file. For instance, even if not required, individuals can file a return in order to receive a refund on withheld income or to receive certain credits (e.g. earned income tax credit).

=== Filing modalities ===
The form may be filed either by paper or online.

==== Paper filing ====
Paper filing is the universally accepted filing method. Form 1040, along with its variants, schedules, and instructions, can be downloaded as PDFs from the Internal Revenue Service website. Finalized versions of the forms for the tax year (which in the US is the same as the calendar year) are released near the end of January of the following year.

Paper forms can be filled and saved electronically using a compatible PDF reader, and then printed. This way, it is easy to keep electronic copies of one's filled forms despite filing by paper. Alternatively, they can be printed out and filled by hand. A combination of the approaches may also be used, with some content filled in electronically and additional content written in by hand. As a general rule, where possible, it makes sense to fill electronically, but in some cases filling by hand may be necessary (for instance, if additional notes of explanation need to be added, or the font used for electronic filling is too large to fit the information in the space provided).

The only parts of the form that cannot be filled electronically are the signature lines.

The paper Form 1040, along with all relevant schedules and additional forms, must be sent in a single packet by mail or courier to an IRS address determined by the US state the taxpayer is filing from and whether or not a payment is enclosed.

The IRS accepts returns that are stapled or paperclipped together. However, any check or payment voucher, as well as accompanying Form 1040-V, must not be stapled or paperclipped with the rest of the return, since payments are processed separately.

==== Electronic filing ====
The IRS allows US residents for tax purposes to file electronically in three ways:

- Those with incomes of $66,000 or less may file electronically using IRS Free File, a free e-filing tool (there are some other conditions necessary to be eligible for free filing; in particular, some kinds of income and deductions cannot be handled by free filing).
- It is possible to prepare one's tax return using a tax compliance software approved by the IRS and have the software file the return electronically.
- One can use a tax professional who has been accepted by the IRS for electronic filing.

Many paid tax preparers are required to file individual tax returns electronically, and most tax compliance software file electronically on the taxpayer's behalf. Even the tax preparers who are not so required, must file Form 8948 if they choose paper filing, providing an explanation for why they are not filing electronically.

==== Comparison ====
If one is not eligible for IRS Free File, depending on the company used it might cost hundreds of dollars to file electronically, whereas paper filing has no costs beyond those of printing and mailing. Furthermore, the available existing electronic filing options may not offer sufficient flexibility with respect to arranging one's tax return, adding attachments, or putting written notes of explanation that can help preempt IRS questions. In the past, filing electronically may have exposed the taxpayer's data to the risk of accidental loss or identity theft, but now e-filing with reputable companies is considered more secure than paper filing.

=== Signature requirement ===
Form 1040 must be signed and dated in order to be considered valid. If filing jointly with a spouse, both must sign and date. If a return is submitted electronically, individuals must use either a Self-Select PIN or Practitioner PIN.

=== Substitute return ===
If an individual decides not to file a return, the IRS may (after it has sent several reminders) file a substitute return.

== Variants ==
For filing the regular tax return, in addition to the standard Form 1040, there are currently three variants: the 1040-NR, 1040-SR, and 1040-X.

Form 1040X, 2011

Form 1040-NR is used by taxpayers who are considered "non-resident aliens" for tax purposes.

Form 1040-SR may be used by taxpayers who are 65 or older. The 1040-SR variant is functionally the same as Form 1040, but is easier to fill out by hand because the text and checkboxes are larger. Seniors may continue to use the standard 1040 for tax filing if they prefer. Its creation was mandated by the Bipartisan Budget Act of 2018, and it was first used for filing taxes for the 2019 tax year.

Form 1040-X (officially, the "Amended U.S. Individual Tax Return") is used to make corrections on Form 1040, Form 1040A, and Form 1040EZ tax returns that have been previously filed (note: forms 1040-A and 1040-EZ were discontinued starting with tax year 2018, but a 1040X may still be filed amending one of these tax forms filed for previous years).

== Accompanying payments ==
=== Form 1040-V ===
Form 1040-V payment voucher form

The 1040-V (officially, the "Payment Voucher for Form 1040") is used as an optional payment voucher to be sent in along with a payment for any balance due on the "Amount you owe" line of the 1040.

The form is entirely optional. The IRS will accept payment without the 1040V form. However including the 1040-V allows the IRS to process payments more efficiently.

Form 1040-V and any accompanying payment should be included in the same packet as the tax return, but should not be stapled or paper-clipped along with the tax return, since it is processed separately.

== Schedules and extra forms ==
Since 1961 Form 1040 has had various separate attachments to the form. These attachments are usually called "schedules" because prior to the 1961, the related sections were schedules on the main form identified by letter. Form 1040 currently has 20 attachments, which may need to be filed depending on the taxpayer. For 2009 and 2010 there was an additional form, Schedule M, due to the "Making Work Pay" provision of the American Recovery and Reinvestment Act of 2009 ("the stimulus").

Starting in 2018, 1040 was "simplified" by separating out 6 new schedules numbers Schedule 1 through Schedule 6 to make parts of the main form optional. The new schedules had the prior old 1040 line numbers to make transition easier.

In addition to the listed schedules, there are dozens of other forms that may be required when filing a personal income tax return. Typically these will provide additional details for deductions taken or income earned that are listed either on form 1040 or its subsequent schedules.

Type	Explanation	Lines where schedule is referenced or needed in Form 1040 or associated numbered schedule (2021)
Schedule A	Itemizes allowable deductions against income; instead of filling out Schedule A, taxpayers may choose to take a standard deduction of between $6,300 and $12,600 (for tax year 2015), depending on age, filing status, and whether the taxpayer and/or spouse is blind.	12a
Schedule B	Enumerates interest and/or dividend income, and is required if either interest or dividends received during the tax year exceed $1,500 from all sources or if the filer had certain foreign accounts.	3b
Schedule C	Lists income and expenses related to self-employment, and is used by sole proprietors.	Sch. 1 line 3
Schedule D	Is used to compute capital gains and losses incurred during the tax year.	7
Schedule E	Is used to report income and expenses arising from the rental of real property, royalties, or from pass-through entities (like trusts, estates, partnerships, or S corporations).	Sch. 1 line 5
Schedule EIC	Is used to document a taxpayer's eligibility for the Earned Income Credit.	27a
Schedule F	Is used to report income and expenses related to farming.	Sch. 1 line 6
Schedule G	(Until 1986) Was used for income averaging over four years until eliminated by the Tax Reform Act of 1986.	N/A
Schedule H	(Since 1995) Is used to report taxes owed due to the employment of household help. Previously these were reported on Form 942.	Sch. 2 line 9
Schedule J	Is used when averaging farm income over a period of three years.	16
Schedule L	(Until 2010) was used to figure an increased standard deduction in certain cases.	N/A
Schedule M	(2009 and 2010) was used to claim the Making Work Pay tax credit (6.2% earned income credit, up to $400).	N/A
Schedule R	Is used to calculate the Credit for the Elderly or the Disabled.	Sch. 3 line 6d
Schedule SE	Is used to calculate the self-employment tax owed on income from self-employment (such as on a Schedule C or Schedule F, or in a partnership).	Sch. 2 line 4
Schedule 1	Additional Income and Adjustments to Income - Former lines 1-36 that were moved from 1040 with those kept on 1040 omitted.	8
Schedule 2	Tax - Former lines 38-47 that were moved from 1040 with those kept on 1040 omitted. Since 2019, this form includes the contents of schedule 4, obsoleting it.	17
Schedule 3	Nonrefundable Credits - Former lines 48-55 that were moved from 1040 with those kept on 1040 omitted. Since 2019, this form is also used for non-refundable credits, obsoleting schedule 5.	20, 31
Schedule 4	(2018) Other Taxes - Former lines 57-64 that were moved from 1040 with those kept on 1040 omitted.	N/A
Schedule 5	(2018) Other Payments and Refundable Credits - Former lines 65-75 that were moved from 1040 with those kept on 1040 omitted.	N/A
Schedule 6	(2018) Foreign Address and Third Party Designee. Since 2019, this is part of the header of the 1040, so is obsolete.	N/A
Schedule 8812	Is used to calculate the Child Tax Credit. (From 1998 to 2011 this was called Form 8812 rather than Schedule 8812.)	19, 28

In 2014 there were two additions to Form 1040 due to the implementation of the Affordable Care Act—the premium tax credit and the individual mandate.

In most situations, other Internal Revenue Service or Social Security Administration forms such as Form W-2 must be attached to the Form 1040, in addition to the Form 1040 schedules. There are over 100 other specialized forms that may need to be completed along with Schedules and the Form 1040. However, Form 1099 need not be attached if no tax was withheld. In general, employer-sent forms are used to substantiate claims of withholding, so only forms that involve withholding need to be attached.

== Estimated payments and withholding ==
For most individuals, withholding is the main way through which taxes are paid. However, income that is not subject to withholding must be estimated using Form 1040-ES. (It may be possible to avoid filing Form 1040-ES by increasing one's withholding and instead filing a Form W-4.)

Estimated payments can be made using the Electronic Federal Tax Payment System.

== Payments, refunds, and penalties ==
There is a three-year limit to when individuals can claim a tax refund. However, payments that are due must be paid immediately.

In addition it is possible to apply one's refunds to next year's taxes and also to change one's mind later.

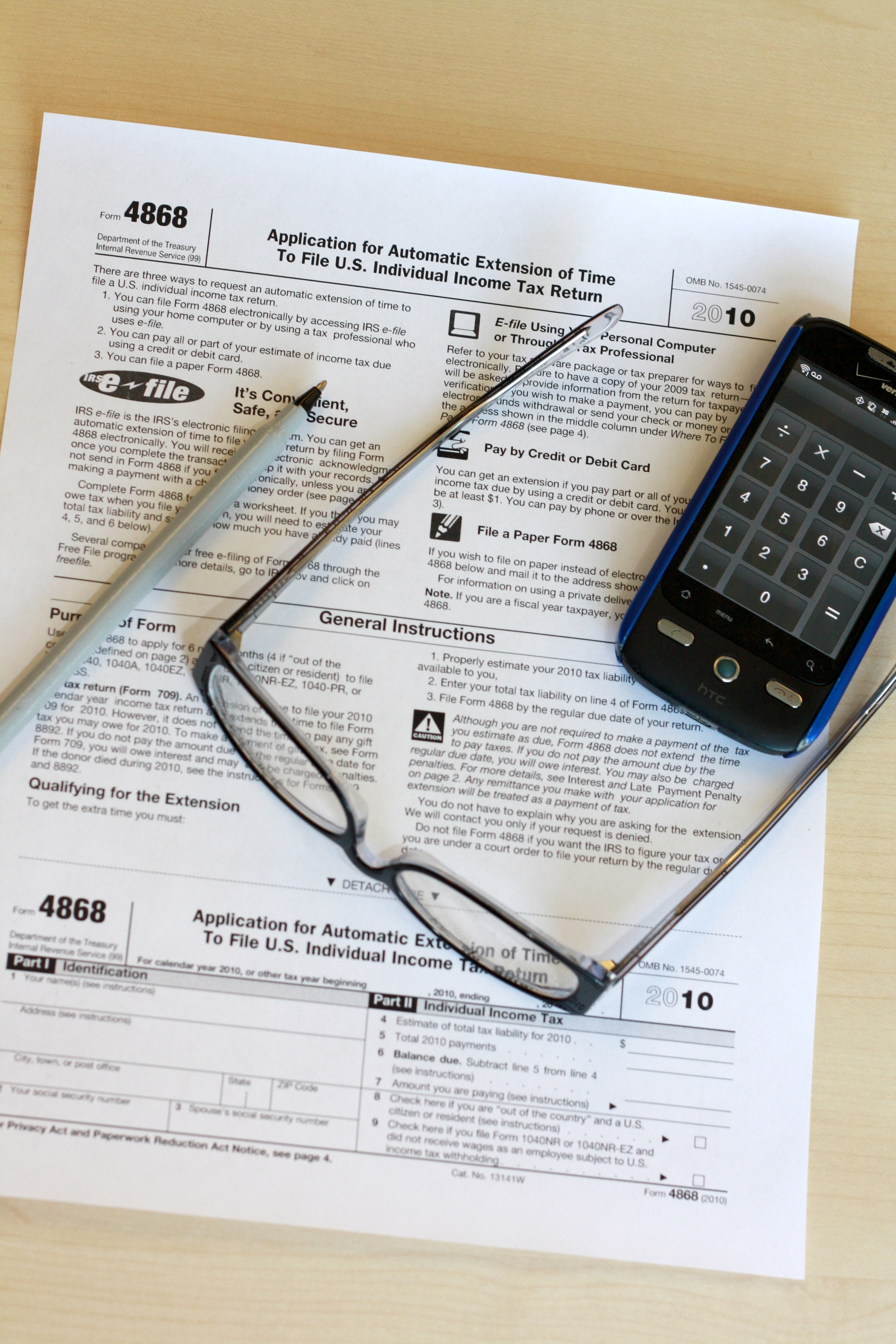
Considering whether to file an extension for the 2010 tax year with Form 4868

An automatic extension until October 15 to file Form 1040 can be obtained by filing Form 4868. There is a penalty for not filing a tax return by April 15 that depends on whether the individual got a filing extension and the amount of unpaid taxes. However, since the maximum penalty is 25% of unpaid taxes, if an individual has paid all their taxes, there is no penalty for not filing.

In addition to making sure that one pays one's taxes for the year by Tax Day, it is also important to make sure that one has paid partial taxes throughout the tax year in the form of estimated tax payments or employer tax withholding. If one has not done so, then a tax penalty may be assessed. The minimum amount of estimated taxes that need to be paid to avoid penalties depends on a variety of factors, including one's income in the tax year in question as well as one's income in the previous year (in general, if one pays 90% of the current year's tax liability or 100% of the previous year's tax liability during the tax year, one is not subject to estimated tax penalty even if this year's taxes are higher, but there are some caveats to that rule). Employer withholding is also treated differently from estimated tax payment, in that for the latter, the time of the year when the payment was made matters, whereas for the former, all that matters is how much has been withheld as of the end of the year (though there are other restrictions on how one can adjust one's withholding pattern that need to be enforced by the employer).

When filing Form 1040, the penalty for failing to pay estimated taxes must be included on the form (on line 79) and included in the total on line 78 (if a net payment is due). The taxpayer is not required to compute other interest and penalties (such as penalty for late filing or late payment of taxes). If the taxpayer does choose to compute these, the computed penalty can be listed on the bottom margin of page 2 of the form, but should not be included on the amount due line (line 78).

== Relationship with state tax returns ==
Each state has separate tax codes in addition to federal taxes. Form 1040 is only used for federal taxes, and state taxes should be filed separately based on the individual state's form. Some states do not have any income tax. Although state taxes are filed separately, many state tax returns will reference items from Form 1040. For example, California's 540 Resident Income Tax form makes a reference to Form 1040's line 37 in line 13.

Certain tax filing software, such as TurboTax, will simultaneously file state tax returns using information filled in on the 1040 form.

The federal government allows individuals to deduct their state income tax or their state sales tax from their federal tax through Schedule A of Form 1040, but not both. In addition to deducting either income tax or sales tax, an individual can further deduct any state real estate taxes or private property taxes.

== OMB control number controversy ==
One argument used by tax protesters against the legitimacy of the 1040 Form is the OMB Control Number of the Paperwork Reduction Act argument. Tax protesters contend that Form 1040 does not contain an "OMB Control Number" which is issued by the U.S. Office of Management and Budget under the Paperwork Reduction Act.

The relevant clauses of the Paperwork Reduction Act state that:

§ 1320.6 Public protection.

(a) Notwithstanding any other provision of law, no person shall be subject to any penalty for failing to comply with a collection of information that is subject to the requirements of this part if:

(1) The collection of information does not display, in accordance with §1320.3(f) and §1320.5(b)(1), a currently valid OMB control number assigned by the Director in accordance with the Act...

(e) The protection provided by paragraph (a) of this section does not preclude the imposition of a penalty on a person for failing to comply with a collection of information that is imposed on the person by statute—e.g., 26 U.S.C. §6011(a) (statutory requirement for person to file a tax return)...

The Courts have responded to the OMB Control Number arguments with the following arguments. 1) Form 1040, U.S. Individual Income Tax Return has contained the OMB Control number since 1981. 2) As ruled in a number of cases, the absence of an OMB Control number does not eliminate the legal obligation to file or pay taxes.

Cases involving the OMB Control Number Argument include:

- United States v. Wunder

The United States Court of Appeals for the Sixth Circuit argues that the provisions on the Paperwork Reduction Act are not relevant as the act applies only to information requests made after December 31, 1981, and tax returns starting from 1981 contained an OMB Control Number.

- United States v. Patridge

The United States Court of Appeals for the Seventh Circuit rejected the convicted taxpayer's OMB control number argument by stating "Finally, we have no doubt that the IRS has complied with the Paperwork Reduction Act. Form 1040 bears a control number from OMB, as do the other forms the IRS commonly distributes to taxpayers. That this number has been constant since 1981 does not imply that OMB has shirked its duty."

- United States v. Lawrence

In this Case, IRS agents who had calculated Lawrence's tax liability had made an error and it was discovered that Lawrence owed less taxes than originally determined. Lawrence asked the trial court to order the government to reimburse him for his legal fees, to which the trial court ruled against him. He appealed to the United States Court of Appeals for the Seventh Circuit, contending that the government's conduct against him had been "vexatious, frivolous, or in bad faith." and also raising the OMB Control Number Argument.

The United States Court of Appeals for the Seventh Circuit rejected the OMB argument stating that

According to Lawrence, the Paperwork Reduction Act of 1995 (PRA) required the Internal Revenue Service to display valid Office of Management and Budget (OMB) numbers on its Form 1040.... Lawrence argues that the PRA by its terms prohibits the government from imposing a criminal penalty upon a citizen for the failure to complete a form where the information request at issue does not comply with the PRA... Yet Lawrence conceded at oral argument that no case from this circuit establishes such a proposition, and in fact Lawrence cites no caselaw from any jurisdiction that so holds. In contrast, the government referenced numerous cases supporting its position that the PRA does not present a defense to a criminal action for failure to file income taxes."

== History ==
=== Original form structure and tax rates ===
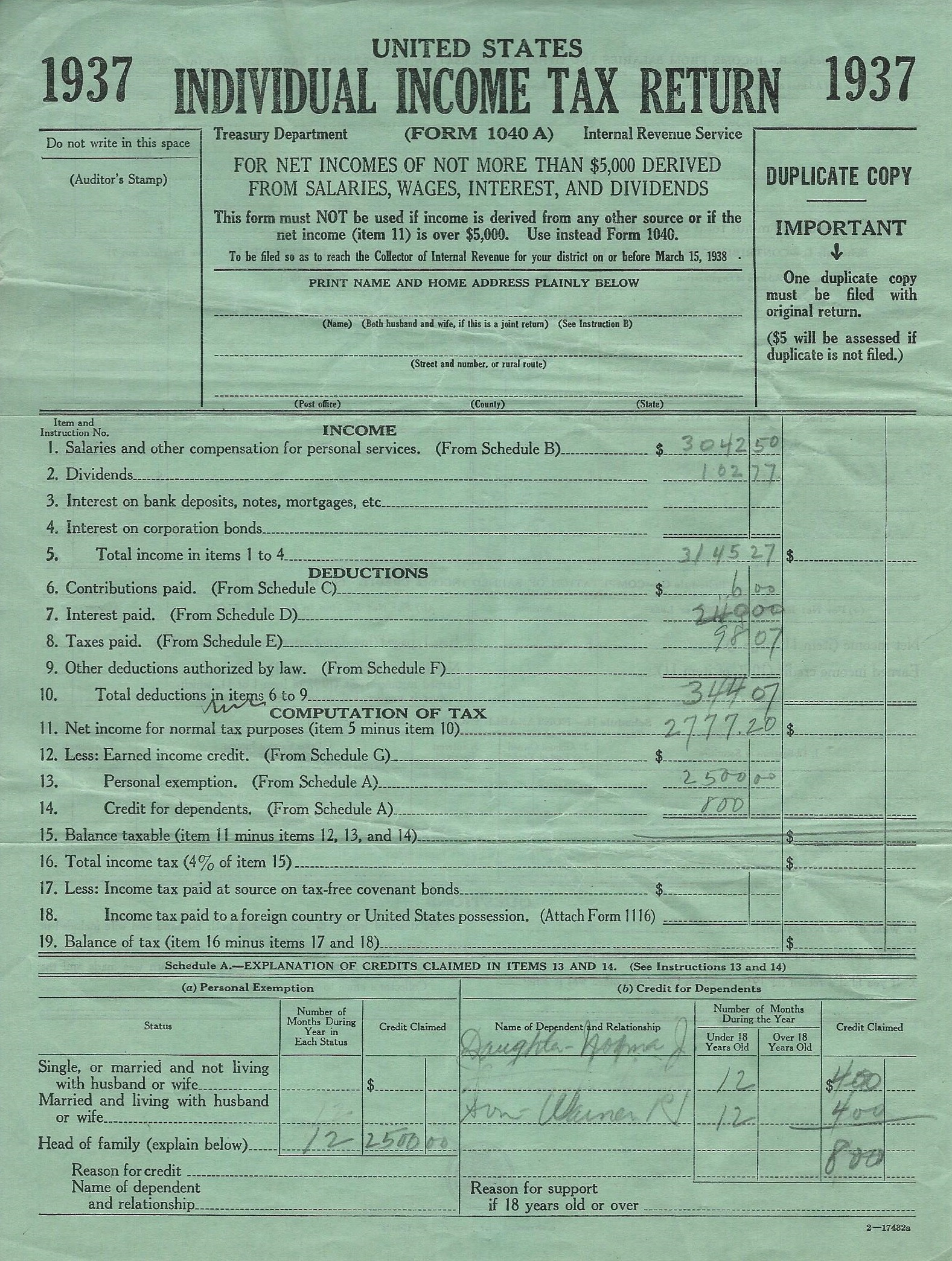
Form 1040A for the 1937 tax year

The first Form 1040 was published for use for the tax years 1913, 1914, and 1915; the number 1040 was simply the next number in the sequential numbering of forms. For 1913, taxes applied only from March 1 to December 31. The original Form 1040, available on the IRS website as well as elsewhere, is three pages and 31 lines long, with the first page focused on computing one's income tax, the second page focused on more detailed documentation of one's income and the third page describing deductions and including a signature area. There is an additional page of instructions. The main rules were:

- The taxable income was calculated starting from gross income, subtracting business-related expenses to get net income, and then subtracting specific exemptions (usually $3,000 or $4,000). In other words, people with net incomes below $3,000 would have to pay no income tax at all. The inflation calculator used by the Bureau of Labor Statistics estimates the corresponding amount in 2015 dollars as $71,920.
- The base income tax rate on taxable income was 1%.
- High earners had to pay additional taxes. The first high-earning tax bracket, $20,000–$50,000, has an additional tax of 1% on the part of net income above $20,000. Thus, somebody with a taxable income of $50,000 (over a million dollars in 2015 dollars according to the BLS) would pay a total of $800 (1% of $50,000 + 1% of $(50,000 − 20,000)) in federal income tax. At the time (when the United States as a whole was much poorer) these higher taxes applied to fewer than 0.5% of the residents of the United States.

Just over 350,000 forms were filed in 1914 and all were audited.

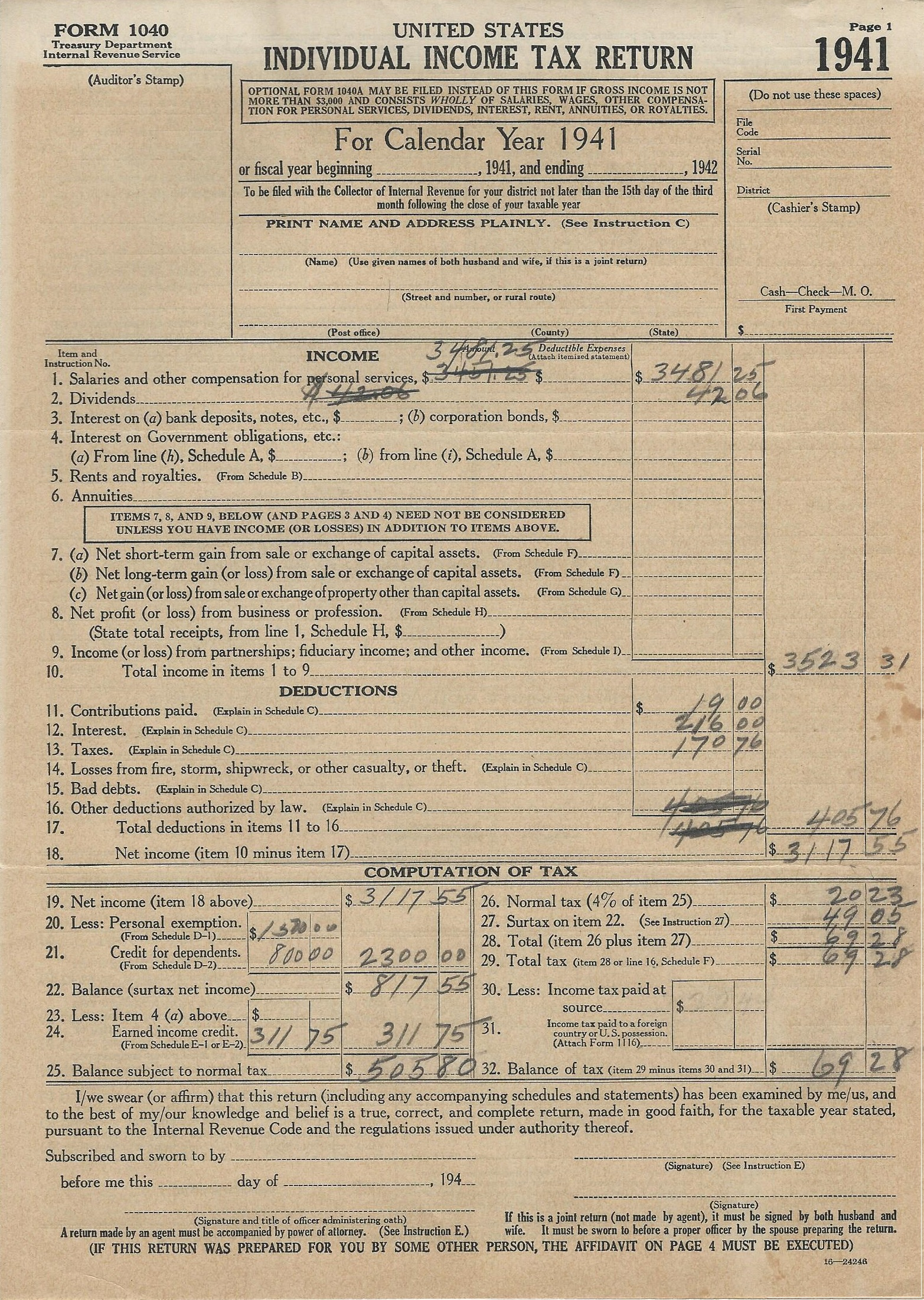
Form 1040 for the 1941 tax year: The basic layout and main entries are familiar, but there are more of them now and the Schedules letters have been reassigned

=== Subsequent changes ===
Form 1040A, 2015 tax year

For 1916, Form 1040 was converted to an annual form (i.e., updated each year with the new tax year printed on the form). Initially, the IRS mailed tax booklets (Form 1040, instructions, and most common attachments) to all households. As alternative delivery methods (CPA/Attorneys, Internet forms) increased in popularity, the IRS sent fewer packets via mail. In 2009 this practice was discontinued.

With the Current Tax Payment Act of 1943, income tax withholding was introduced. The Individual Income Tax Act of 1944 created standard deductions on the 1040.

The tax return deadline was original set at March 1. This was changed to March 15 in the Revenue Act of 1918, and in the Internal Revenue Code of 1954, the tax return deadline was changed to April 15 from March 15, as part of a large-scale overhaul of the tax code. The reason for March 1 was not explained in the law, but was presumably to give time after the end of the tax (and calendar) year to prepare tax returns. The two-week extension from March 1 to March 15 occurred after the Revenue Act of 1918 was passed in February 1919, given only a few weeks to complete returns under the new law. The month extension from March 15 to April 15 was to give additional time for taxpayers and accountants to prepare taxes, owing to the more complex tax code, and also helped spread work by the IRS over a longer time, as it would receive returns over a longer time.

The 1040A was introduced by the 1930s to simplify the filing process and discontinued after tax year 2017. It was limited to taxpayers with taxable income below $100,000 who take the standard deduction instead of itemizing deductions.

The 1040EZ was used for tax years 1982–2017. Its use was limited to taxpayers with no dependents to claim, with taxable income below $100,000 who take the standard deduction instead of itemizing deductions.

Electronic filing was introduced in a limited form in 1986, with the passage of the Tax Reform Act of 1986, and starting 1992, taxpayers who owed money were allowed to file electronically. The Electronic Federal Tax Payment System, jointly managed by the IRS and Financial Management Service, started in 1996 and allowed people to make estimated payments.

With the passage of the Tax Cuts and Jobs Act of 2017, a new, redesigned Form 1040 was released for tax year 2018. It reduced the number of lines from 79 to 23, removed two of the variants (1040A and 1040EZ) in favor of the redesigned Form 1040, and redesigned the supplemental schedules.

=== Changes to complexity and tax rates ===
The complexity and compliance burden of the form and its associated instructions have increased considerably since 1913. The National Taxpayers Union has documented the steady increase in complexity from a 34-line form in 1935 to a 79-line form in 2014, decreasing to 23 lines in 2018. Quartz created an animated GIF showing the gradual changes to the structure and complexity of the form. The NTU table is below with data through 2014:

Form 1040EZ, 2011

Tax year	Lines, Form 1040	Pages, Form 1040	Pages, Form 1040 Instruction Booklet
2018	23	2	221
2017	79	2	220
2016	79	2	215
2015	79	2	211
2014	79	2	209
2013	77	2	206
2012	77	2	214
2011	77	2	189
2010	77	2	179
2005	76	2	142
2000	70	2	117
1995	66	2	84
1985	68	2	52
1975	67	2	39
1965	54	2	17
1955	28	2	16
1945	24	2	4
1935	34	1	2

The number of pages in the federal tax law grew from 400 in 1913 to over 72,000 in 2011. The increase in complexity can be attributed to an increase in the number and range of activities being taxed, an increase in the number of exemptions, credits, and deductions available, an increase in the subtlety of the rules governing taxation and the edge cases explicitly spelled out based on historical experience, and an increase in the base of taxpayers making it necessary to offer longer, more explicit instructions for less sophisticated taxpayers. As an example, whereas the initial versions of Form 1040 came only with a rate schedule included in the tax form itself, the IRS now publishes a complete tax table for taxable income up to $100,000 so that people can directly look up their tax liability from their taxable income without having to do complicated arithmetic calculations based on the rate schedule. The IRS still publishes its rate schedule so that people can quickly compute their approximate tax liability, and lets people with incomes of over $100,000 compute their taxes directly using the Tax Computation Worksheet.

In addition to an increase in the complexity of the form, the tax rates have also increased, though the increase in tax rates has not been steady (with huge upswings and downswings) in contrast with the steady increase in tax complexity.

=== Cost of filing ===
For tax return preparation, Americans spent roughly 20 percent of the amount collected in taxes (estimating the compliance costs and efficiency costs is difficult because neither the government nor taxpayers maintain regular accounts of these costs). As of 2013, there were more tax preparers in the US (1.2 million) than there were law enforcement officers (765 thousand) and firefighters (310,400) combined. The National Taxpayers Union estimated the 2018 compliance cost at 11 hours per form 1040 vs. 12 hours in 2017, with a total of $92.5 billion spent in individual income tax compliance vs. $94.27 billion in 2017.

In 2008, 57.8 percent of tax returns were filed with assistance from paid tax preparers, compared to about 20 percent of taxpayers employing a paid preparer in the 1950s.

== See also ==
- List of countries by tax rates
