= Small Business Jobs Act of 2010 =

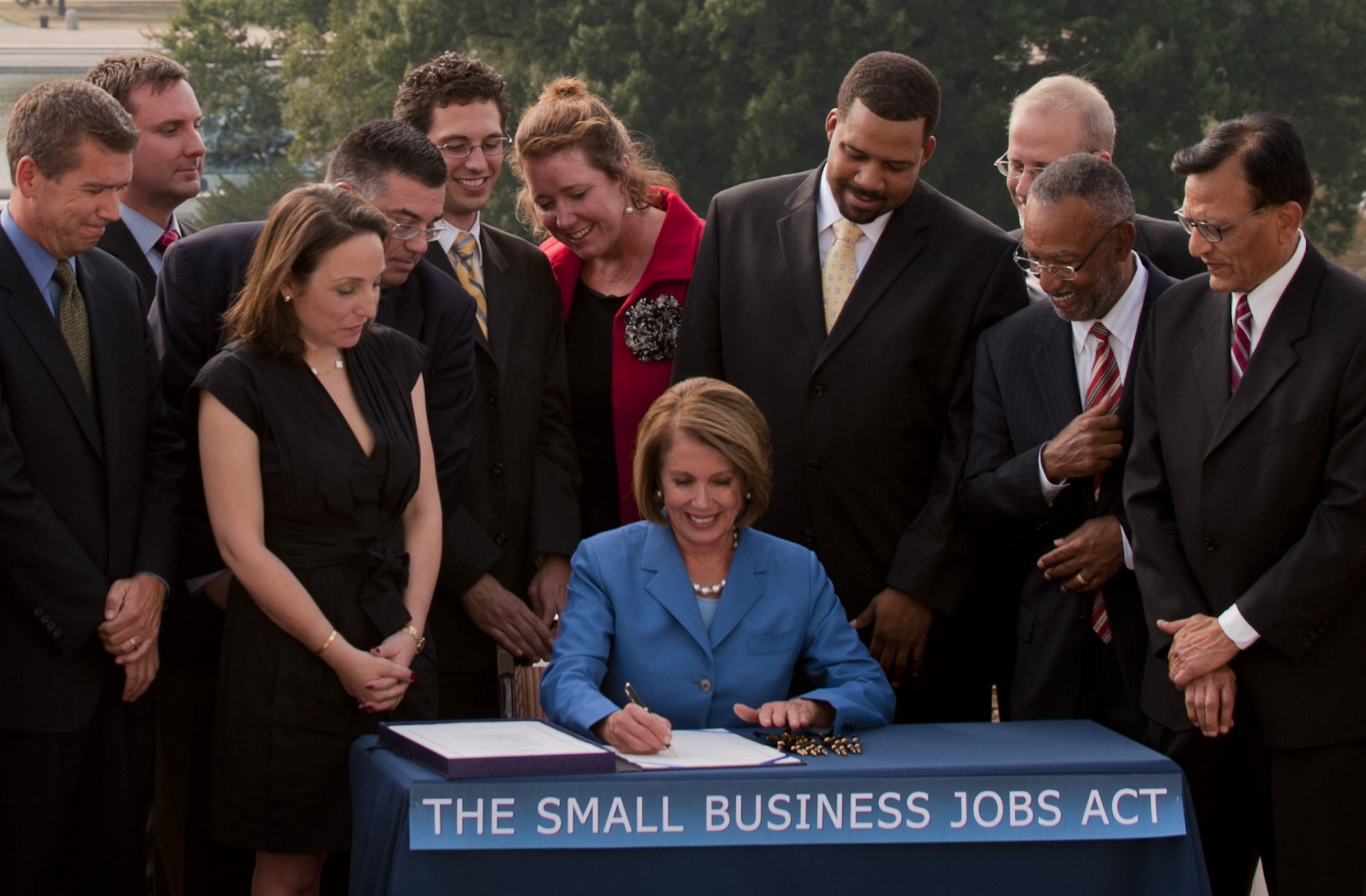
Speaker of the House Nancy Pelosi signing the bill after it passed in the House September 23, 2010

The Small Business Jobs Act of 2010 (H.R. 5297) is a federal law passed by the 111th United States Congress and signed into law by President Barack Obama on September 27, 2010. The law authorizes the creation of the Small Business Lending Fund Program administered by the Treasury Department to make capital investments in eligible institutions, in order to increase the availability of credit for small businesses.

== Provisions ==
The provisions of the Act included:

- Establishes the creation of a $30 billion lending program for community banks with assets less than $10 billion.
- Increases limits on how much money a company can borrow under various Small Business Administration loan programs.
- Provides $12 billion in tax cuts, including a 100% exclusion of capital gains taxes on small business investments.
- Allows for small businesses to carry back general business tax credits to offset the tax burden from the previous five years. Small businesses also will be able to use these credits against the Alternative Minimum Tax.
- Boosts the tax deduction for start-up expenses to $10,000, for small business owners who spend $60,000 or less to start their business.
- Allows cell phone costs to be deducted or depreciated like other business property.
- Allows business owners to deduct the cost of health insurance incurred during 2010 for themselves and their family members in the calculation of their 2010 self-employment tax.
- Creates the State Small Business Credit Initiative.
- Introduces a new requirement for owners of rental property to file information returns (form 1099) reporting certain payments made to suppliers of services
- Allow participants in 457(b) Plans to treat elective deferrals as Roth contributions.

== Developments ==
Some aspects of the Act's bonus depreciation mechanism were extended and amplified by the Tax Relief, Unemployment Insurance Reauthorization, and Job Creation Act of 2010, passed and signed into law in December 2010.

== Drawbacks ==
Most angel investors and venture capital groups utilize convertible debt and/or warrants in the majority of their investment arrangements. A major drawback is the exclusion of convertible debt and warrants from the Act. Holders of convertible debt or warrants must convert or exercise the security and hold it for five years in order to qualify for the tax exemption. This negates the purpose of structuring an investment utilizing convertible debt and/or warrants. Therefore, most angel investors and venture capital groups will receive little or no value from this law.

As a part of the Small Business Jobs Act of 2010 the House and Senate passed increased penalties for failure to file a correct information return. The increase in penalties is intended to improve compliance and increase penalty income.

In summary the changes are as follows:

- First tier penalties for late filing (up to 30 days after the January 31st deadline) increased from $15 to $30 per occurrence with the maximum increasing from $75,000 to $250,000 per year
- Second tier penalties (corrected or initial filing prior to August 1) increased from $30 to $60 per occurrence with the maximum increasing from $150,000 to $500,000 per year
- Third tier penalties (any change after August 1) increased from $50 to $100 per occurrence with the maximum increasing from $250,000 to $1,500,000 per year
- The minimum penalty for each failure due to intentional disregard was increased from $100 to $250 per occurrence and still has to annual maximum
- The maximum annual penalties for small businesses were also increased to $75,000, $200,000 and $500,000 for each tier.

Some banks have replaced their funds from the Troubled Asset Relief Program with funds from the SBLF. This practice has been criticized by the TARP Inspector General and members of Congress, as banks can use it to lift the restrictions imposed by TARP even while reducing their small business lending.
