= BoardSource =

U.S. nonprofit organization

Official Logo

BoardSource, formerly the National Center for Nonprofit Boards, is an American nonprofit organization founded in 1988. Its mission is "to inspire and support excellence in nonprofit governance and board and staff leadership".

BoardSource offers consulting services, publications and a membership program to increase the effectiveness of nonprofit organizations by strengthening their boards of directors.

== History ==
In the early 1980s, the Association of Governing Boards of Universities and Colleges and Independent Sector conducted a survey and found that 30 percent of respondents believed they were doing a good job of board education and training, with the rest of the respondents reporting little, if any, activity in strengthening governance. As a result, the two organizations proposed the creation of a new organization whose mission was to increase the effectiveness of nonprofit boards.

With a lead grant from the W. K. Kellogg Foundation as well as funding from five other donors, the National Center for Nonprofit Boards opened its doors in 1988 with a staff of three and an operating budget of US$385,000.

The National Center for Nonprofit Boards changed its name to BoardSource in 2002.

== Current status ==
BoardSource is based in Washington, D.C., and has an annual budget in fiscal year 2013 of approximately $6 million. It maintains a staff of more than 40 employees. In addition, the organization has an affiliated pool of associates who conduct consulting and training engagements around the country on behalf of the organization.

BoardSource collaborates with organizations such as the Corporation for Public Broadcasting, the American Association of Museums, the Boys and Girls Clubs of America, Habitat for Humanity International, the National Council of La Raza and the United Way of America to provide guidance on what constitutes good governance and to offer educational opportunities in new approaches to governance.

According to its website, "BoardSource supports a community of more than 90,000 individuals with customized diagnostics, live and virtual trainings, membership programs, and a comprehensive library of governance resources and publications that include original content."

== Initiatives ==
In addition to its own web portal, BoardSource managed the online platform Exceptional Boards (now defunct) and the online portal Leading with Intent. Leading with Intent is a rolling annual report on nonprofit board governance across the United States that captures and compares social sector governance data since 1994.

== Board of directors ==
BoardSource's board of directors includes:

- Rick Moyers - Independent Consultant (Board Chair)
- John Griswold - Founder, CommonFund Institute
- Phillip Henderson - CEO, Surdna Foundation
- Yanela Frias - Senior Vice President, Head of Structured Settlements (Prudential Annuities), Prudential Financial
- Carol A. Goss - Fellow in the Advanced Leadership Initiative Program, Harvard University
- David B. McGinty - Leader of the Human Development Innovation Fund with Palladium International
- Sharon Rossmark - Chief Executive Officer, Woman and Drones LLC
- Mark Shamley - President & CEO, Association of Corporate Contributions Professionals (ACCP)
- Cathy A. Trower, Ph.D. - President, Trower & Trower, Inc. and author of The Practitioner's Guide to Governance as Leadership: Building High-Performing Nonprofit Boards (Jossey-Bass 2012)
- Judy Vredenburgh - President & CEO, Girls, Inc.
- Sylvia Mei-ling Yee, Ph.D. - Senior Advisor, Evelyn and Walter Haas, Jr. Fund
- Julia R. Wilson, Chief Executive Officer, OneJustice
