= Form 1099 =

IRS tax form

Form 1099 is one of several IRS tax forms (see the variants section) used in the United States to prepare and file an information return to report various types of income other than wages, salaries, and tips (for which Form W-2 is used instead). The term information return is used in contrast to the term tax return although the latter term is sometimes used colloquially to describe both kinds of returns.

The form is used to report payments to independent contractors, rental property income, income from interest and dividends, sales proceeds, and other miscellaneous income recipients to tax professionals. This has led to the phrases "1099 workers" and "the 1099 economy" to refer to those whose income is reported on Form 1099, in contrast to a "W-2 employee" who receives Form W-2.

Blank 1099 forms and the related instructions can be downloaded from the IRS website.

== Significance for payee's tax return ==
Payees use the information provided on the 1099 forms to help them complete their own tax returns. In order to save paper, payers can give payees one single Combined Form 1099 that lists all of their 1099 transactions for the entire year. Taxpayers are usually not required to attach Form 1099s to their own Federal income tax returns unless the Form 1099 includes a report for Federal income tax withheld by the payer from the related payments.

The issuance or non-issuance of a Form 1099 in a particular case is not determinative of the tax treatment required of the payee. Each payee-taxpayer is legally responsible for reporting the correct amount of total income on his or her own Federal income tax return regardless of whether a Form 1099 was filed.

For a variety of reasons some Form 1099 reports may include amounts that are not actually taxable to the payee. A typical example is Form 1099-S for reporting proceeds (not gain) from real estate transactions. The Form 1099-S preparer will report the sales proceeds without regard to the amount of the taxpayer's "basis" in the real estate sold. (Basis is usually the amount of cost incurred by the taxpayer when he or she acquired the property, perhaps years before the sale.) The taxpayer's basis amount is deducted by the taxpayer (on his or her own tax return) from the proceeds amount to determine the gain (if any) on the sale.

In any case, the payee-taxpayer remains responsible for filing an accurate Federal income tax return.

== Filing requirements ==
Each payer must complete a Form 1099 for each covered transaction. Three or four copies are made: one for the payer, one for the payee, one for the IRS, and one for the State Tax Department, if required. Payers who file 250 or more Form 1099 reports must file all of them electronically with the IRS. If the fewer than 250 requirement is met, and paper copies are filed, the IRS also requires the payer to submit a copy of Form 1096, which is a summary of information forms being sent to the IRS. That said, Form 1096 is not required if 1099 form filed electronically. The returns must be filed with the IRS and sent to payees by the end of January immediately following the year for which the income items or other proceeds are paid.

The law provides various dollar amounts under which no Form 1099 reporting requirement is imposed. For some variants of Form 1099, for example, no filing is required for payees who receive less than $600 from the payer during the applicable year. For Form 1099-MISC and Form 1099-NEC in particular, businesses are required to submit a form for every contractor paid more than $600 for services during a year. This requirement usually does not apply to corporations receiving payments. See the table in the variants section for specific minimum amounts for each form. The $600 threshold will change to $2,000 as of the 2026 tax year; the threshold will be adjusted for inflation in subsequent years.

The form is used to report income, proceeds, etc., only on a calendar year (January 1 through December 31) basis, regardless of the fiscal year used by the payer or payee for other Federal tax purposes.

== Variants ==
As of 2015, several versions of Form 1099 are used, depending on the nature of the income transaction.

One notable use of Form 1099 is to report amounts paid by a business (including nonprofits) to a non-corporate US resident independent contractor for services (in IRS terminology, such payments are nonemployee compensation). The ubiquity of the form has also led to use of the phrase "1099 workers" or "the 1099 economy" to refer to the independent contractors themselves.

In 2011 the requirement was extended by the Small Business Jobs Act of 2010 to payments made by persons who receive income from rental property.

Form 1099 is also used to report interest (1099-INT), dividends (1099-DIV), sales proceeds (1099-B) and some kinds of miscellaneous income (1099-MISC). Blank 1099 forms and the related instructions can be downloaded from the IRS website.

The following table provides information for each variant. Note that for those who have electronic filing of Form 1099 set up, the due date for the IRS is March 31 rather than the last day of February.

Form	Use	Minimum amount to issue	Issuer	Date due to recipient	Date due to IRS
1099-A	Acquisition or Abandonment of Secured Property	Any amount	Lender	January 31	Last day of February
1099-B	Proceeds from Broker and Barter Exchange Transactions	Any amount	Broker or barter exchange	February 15	Last day of February
1099-C	Cancellation of debt	$600 (Note: An exception to the requirement to issue Form 1099-C is when a student loan has been discharged under the terms of the Tax Cuts and Jobs Act of 2017 due to the borrower's death or permanent disability. The IRS has notified lenders and servicers of such loans that they should not issue this form regardless of the amount discharged.)	Lender	January 31	Last day of February
1099-CAP	Changes in Corporate Control and Capital Structure	$100 million	Corporation	January 31	Last day of February
1099-DA	Digital Asset Proceeds From Broker Transactions	Any amount	Digital asset brokers (exchanges, hosted wallet providers, etc.)	February 15	Last day of February
1099-DIV	Dividends and Distributions	$10 ($600 for liquidations)	Investment fund company	January 31	Last day of February
1099-G	Government Payments	$10	Government agency	January 31	Last day of February
1099-H	Health Insurance Advance Payments	Any amount	Provider of health insurance coverage	January 31	Last day of February
1099-INT	Interest Income	$10 ($600 for some interest)	Payer of interest income (usually a bank, financial institution, or government)	January 31	Last day of February
1099-K	Merchant Card and Third Party Network Payments	$2,500 for 2025		January 31	Last day of February
1099-LTC	Long-Term Care Benefits	Any amount	Insurance company	January 31	Last day of February
1099-MISC	Miscellaneous Income	$600 for most compensation ($10 for royalties)	Payer	January 31	Last day of February
1099-NEC	Non-Employee Compensation	$600	Payer	February 1	February 1
1099-OID	Original Issue Discount	$10	Issuer of the debt instrument or broker	January 31	Last day of February
1099-PATR	Taxable Distributions Received From Cooperatives	$10	Cooperative	January 31	Last day of February
1099-Q	Payment from Qualified Education Programs	Any amount	Administrator or bank that manages one's 529 plan or Coverdell ESA	January 31	Last day of February
1099-R	Distributions from Pensions, Annuities, Retirement Plans, IRAs, or Insurance Contracts	$10	Custodian	January 31	Last day of February
1099-S	Proceeds from Real Estate Transactions	$600	Person responsible for closing the transaction; if no one is responsible for closing the transaction, then in order: the mortgage lender, the transferor's broker, the transferee's broker, or the transferee	January 31	Last day of February
1099-SA	Distributions From an HSA, Archer MSA, or Medicare Advantage MSA	Any amount	Institution that administers the HSA or MSA	January 31	Last day of February
SSA-1099	Social Security Benefit Statement	Any amount	Social Security Administration	January 31	N/A
RRB-1099	Payments by the Railroad Retirement Board	Any amount	Railroad Retirement Board	January 31	N/A
RRB-1099-R	Pension and Annuity Income by the Railroad Retirement Board	Any amount (no amount listed in Publication 575)	Railroad Retirement Board	January 31	N/A

== History ==
The War Revenue Act of 1917 required every entity to report certain payments made to another entity. Payments subject to reporting included payments of interest, rent, salaries, wages, premiums, annuities, compensation, remuneration, emoluments, or other fixed or determinable gains, profits, and income. Payments to an entity were required to be reported if the payments totaled at least $800 during the year. The payor was required to report the name and address of the payee and the total amount of payments on Form 1099 and sent to the Internal Revenue Service by March 1 of the year following the payments. The payor was required to include Form 1096, a letter of transmittal and affidavit certifying the accuracy of each Form 1099.

== See also ==
- Form 1040
- Taxation in the United States
