= Electronic Federal Tax Payment System =

System allowing US taxes to be paid

The Electronic Federal Tax Payment System (EFTPS) is an online federal tax payment system in the United States designed and maintained by the Internal Revenue Service (IRS) and Bureau of the Fiscal Service branches of the United States Department of the Treasury.

== History ==
The Internal Revenue Service contracted with First Chicago Corporation, National Computer Systems, AT&T, IBM, Mercantile Bancorp, and Intranet to develop EFTPS in 1994. NationsBank and First National Bank of Chicago were contracted to monitor electronic payment transmissions, prepare financial reports, and develop the database systems for EFTPS. EFTPS was originally anticipated to be available to the corporations in mid-1995 and available to individuals in 1996. By eliminating certain paperwork and automating certain systems, the Department of the Treasury estimated that EFTPS would save at least $433 million in savings by 1999. EFTPS replaced TaxLink, an older electronic tax payment system that began in 1993.

Businesses with annual employment tax payments of at least $47 million were required to use EFTPS in 1996, while businesses with annual employment tax payments of at least $50,000 were required to use EFTPS by 1997. For businesses who were required to EFTPS, the IRS delayed assessing penalties for non-compliance until June 30, 1997. Other businesses were allowed to use EFTPS voluntarily. The IRS mailed letters to most businesses announcing EFTPS and encouraging them to begin using it.

== Services ==
EFTPS allows individuals and businesses to make their tax and estimated tax payments securely online using their bank accounts. Payments can be made only after enrolling in the system, and the enrollment process can take about a week (initial online enrollment is followed by relevant information being sent by physical mail, after which the online enrollment process may be completed). The enrollment process includes information about the bank account from which one's payments will be debited.

Payments must be scheduled at least 1 day and at most 365 days in advance. Separate modalities exist for same-day payment.

A Forbes article about EFTPS recommends using the service to make estimated tax payments, noting that one can schedule payments in advance but also modify the payments in case of some unexpected changes to plans. The article also notes the importance of planning in advance the first year one intends to use the service: "The first year you sign up for the federal online system you need some lead time because a PIN is sent via snail mail within five to seven days. Then you go back online to set up your quarterly estimated payments, plugging in your checking account information and the dates you want the estimated payments withdrawn."

== Differences Between Electronic Federal Tax Payment System and IRS Direct Pay ==
The Electronic Federal Tax Payment System (EFTPS) and IRS Direct Pay are two different methods that taxpayers in the United States can use to pay their federal taxes. However, they differ in several aspects, including their features, payment options, and types of taxes that can be paid.

Differences Between EFTPS and IRS Direct Pay
EFTPS	IRS Direct Pay
EFTPS requires registration before use. Once enrolled, users receive a Personal Identification Number (PIN) via mail, which they can use along with their Employer Identification Number (for businesses) or Social Security Number (for individuals) to log in and make payments.	Direct Pay doesn't require registration. Taxpayers can pay their tax bill or make estimated tax payments directly without enrolling in the system.
EFTPS allows scheduling payments up to 365 days in advance.	Payments cannot be scheduled in advance more than 30 days with Direct Pay.
EFTPS allows taxpayers to pay federal taxes 24/7.	Direct Pay only allows for the payment of individual tax payments (1040 series) and estimated taxes. It does not cover business-related taxes.
Through EFTPS, taxpayers can also verify the last 16 months of their tax payment history.	Direct Pay does not provide a payment history feature.

Both EFTPS and IRS Direct Pay are secure ways to pay your federal taxes

== Privacy ==
The EFTPS website claims that the Internal Revenue Service and other government agencies do not obtain access to the enrollee's account, and only payments explicitly scheduled or authorized by the enrollee are processed by the website. In particular, the EFTPS account cannot be used by the IRS to confiscate assets if they believe that taxes were underpaid.

== See also ==
- IRS e-file
