= Exchange of information =

International tax co-operation rules to tackle tax evasion

Exchange of Information is an umbrella term which refers to international co-operation in the field of taxation through the exchange of information on taxpayers between tax authorities.

International exchange of information rules shares many similarities with domestic tax information reporting, such as the United States' Form 1099 regime. However, rules are set on an international level; in recent years exchange of information efforts have been led by the OECD Global Forum on Transparency and Exchange of Information for Tax Purposes.

There are 3 types of exchange of tax information which are currently in use:

1. Exchange Of Information on Request (EOIR) - Tax treaties and tax information exchange agreements generally provide for tax authorities to request information in relation to the assessment, collection or prosecution of tax related issues. The OECD Global Forum conduct peer reviews on compliance with EOIR standards.
2. Spontaneous Exchange of Information (SEI) - Certain international agreements provide for tax authorities to exchange information spontaneously where they discover something which may affect the tax payable in another country. For example, the EU's Directive on Administrative Co-operation in tax matters provides for spontaneous exchange of information.
3. Automatic Exchange of Information (AEOI) - Since 2014, the OECD has promoted the automatic exchange of information between countries under the Common Reporting Standard (CRS). The US imposed similar reporting obligations through the Foreign Account Tax Compliance Act (FATCA) provisions.

== Exchange of Information on Request (EOIR) ==
EOIR is the oldest form of exchange of information and is now contained in Article 26 of the OECD's Model Tax Convention on Income and on Capital. Article 26 allows the tax authority in one country to request specific information in relation to a taxpayer or class of taxpayers to allow for the assessment and collection of tax, or the prosecution of tax evasion.

Since 2010, the OECD Global Forum has conducted peer reviews of countries' compliance with EOIR and rated all countries on a scale which includes compliant, largely compliant, partially compliant and non-compliant.

As at September, the OECD notes that 85% of jurisdictions have received a satisfactory overall rating (“Compliant” or “Largely Compliant”), while 13% have been assessed as "Partially Compliant" and 2% as "Non-Compliant".

== Automatic Exchange of Information (AEOI) ==
Automatic Exchange of Information between countries is comparatively new, starting with the EU's Savings Directive.

In 2010, the United States implemented the Foreign Account Tax Compliance Act provisions as part of the Hiring Incentives to Restore Employment Act, which required banks and other financial institutions to report on accounts held by US citizens anywhere in the world.

As a result of data privacy and extraterritorial concerns with the FATCA provisions, the US entered into more than 100 Intergovernmental Agreements with other countries in order to collect the information.

That model served as the basis for the OECD to create the Common Reporting Standard, which was agreed in 2014 and has since been adopted or committed to by 120 countries globally.

Global AEOI regimes include:

- Central Electronic System of Payments (CESOP) - an EU regime for the exchange of information on cross-border payments received by merchants
- Common Reporting Standard - exchanging information held on offshore bank accounts and other assets
- Country-by-Country Reporting - exchanging information on companies global operations not in the public domain
- Crypto-Asset Reporting Framework - exchanging information on cryptocurrency and other digital asset transactions
- Digital Platforms Information - exchanging information on the users (sellers) on digital platforms
- FATCA - exchanging information on offshore bank accounts held by US citizens and companies

=== AEOI in the European Union ===
Within the EU, AEOI is governed by the Directive on Administrative Co-operation in the field of Taxation (2011/16) (commonly referred to as 'the DAC'). Since 2011, the DAC has been amended 7 times to increase the scope of AEOI, as well as an amendment to the Regulation on Administrative Co-operation in VAT matters to add additional AEOI on EU payments.

Of the 9 measures introduced by the EU, 6 are aligned to OECD measures. In other areas, the EU has acted unilaterally. As a result of Brexit, the United Kingdom is a participant in all measures up to and including DAC5, with a limited implementation of DAC6.

== Effects of introducing AEOI ==
=== Increase in data exchanged ===
The introduction of exchange of information regimes globally by the OECD results in a significant increase of information provided by tax authorities for use in compliance and enforcement activities.

Automatic exchange of information results in significantly more data being shared with tax authorities than exchange of information on request. There have been more than 370,000 exchanges of information on request by OECD members since 2009. In a single year, 2022, there was automatic exchange of information on 123 million financial accounts covering €12 trillion in assets under the Common Reporting Standard.

Similar patterns can be observed in respect of the US; in 2019, the Internal Revenue Service received reports on almost 8.3 million offshore accounts held by US persons. More than 50% had invalid or missing Social Security numbers.

Future regimes are expected to capture even greater volumes of data. In 2020, the European Commission estimated that 8 billion transactions a year would be reported in respect of payments under CESOP. They also estimated that 35 million users of digital platform (infrastructure) would be reportable under new information reporting requirements, with a particular focus on online marketplaces offering homestays.

=== Increased compliance ===
Given the overall purpose of exchange of information is to improve compliance, there have been numerous studies into the effect of introducing exchange of information.

One study found that the introduction of the Common Reporting Standard resulted in an 27.9% drop in assets held in non-EU tax havens, though it also noted that the failure of the United States to adopt CRS resulted in its emergence "as a potentially attractive location for cross-border tax evasion".

A separate study showed similar results from the introduction of the US FATCA regime:

"...a $7.8 billion to $15.3 billion decrease in equity foreign portfolio investment to the United States from tax haven countries after FATCA implementation, consistent with a decrease in “roundtripping” investments attributable to U.S. investors’ offshore tax evasion. When testing total worldwide investment out of financial accounts in tax havens post FATCA, we find a decline of $56.6 billion to $78.0 billion."

A 2023 study found that a Swiss voluntary disclosure programme combined with the introduction of the Common Reporting Standard result in the disclosure of assets equivalent to 10% of GDP.

== See also ==
- Financial Action Task Force (FATF)
- Global Forum on Transparency and Exchange of Information for Tax Purposes for global adoption of EOIR and AEOI
- Directive on Administrative Co-operation in the field of Taxation (2011/16) for adoption of exchange on information in the EU.
- Tax treaty or double tax agreements
- Tax evasion
