= Global Forum on Transparency and Exchange of Information for Tax Purposes =

International body focused on anti-tax evasion and exchange of information

- Predecessor: 1996 G7 Lyon Summit: tackling harmful tax practices and tax havens
- Formation: 2000
- Type: International Economic Treaty Organization
- Purpose: Multilateral framework within which work in the area transparency and exchange of information has been carried out by both OECD and non-OECD economies
- Members: 173 member jurisdictions and the European Union, with 23 observers
- Chair: Maria-José Garde
- Chair of PEER Review group: Huey Min Chia-Tern
- Head of the Global Forum Secretariat: Manatta Zayda
- Key people: François d'Aubert (past Chair)
- Parent organization: OECD
- Budget: €3.9 million (2013)
- Revenue: fixed annual fee of €15,300 per member and a progressive fee determined by scale in accordance with jurisdictions’ Gross National Product.
- Staff: 27
- Website: www.oecd.org/tax/transparency/

The Global Forum on Transparency and Exchange of Information for Tax Purposes was founded in 2000 and restructured in September 2009. It consists of OECD member countries as well as other jurisdictions that have agreed to implement tax related transparency and information exchange. The forum works under the auspices of the OECD and G20. Its mission is to "implement the international standard through two phases of peer review process". It addresses tax evasion, tax havens, offshore financial centres, tax information exchange agreements, double taxation and money laundering.

In 2000, the Forum published a blacklist of 35 tax havens, which by 2009 had shrunk to zero. It has since focused on increasing the standard for exchange of information. As of December 2021, the Forum had 163 member tax jurisdictions and the European Union, all on equal footing.

== Activities ==
The Forum promotes the implementation of two internationally agreed standards on exchange of information for tax purposes: the standard on Exchange of Information on Request (EOIR) and the standard on Automatic Exchange of Information (AEOI). Members commit to at least implement EOIR.

=== Exchange of Information on Request ===
The Forum ensures compliance with EOIR through an intense peer review process, the forum's main activity since 2009, which is carried out by its Peer Review Group composed of 30 members representative of the diversity of the Forum, and is currently chaired by Singapore.

The review focuses on three main parts, divided into ten elements: Ownership and identity information (A.1); Accounting records (A.2); Banking Information (A.3); Access to Information (B.1); Compatibility of Rights and Safeguards (B.2); Effective mechanisms for EOIR (C.1); Network of EOIR partners (C.2); Confidentiality (C.3); Respect of Rights and Safeguards (C.4); Quality and Timeliness (C.5). Every element is evaluated with regards to the legal and regulatory framework (Phase 1) but also its effective implementation (Phase 2). The output of the peer review is a report in which a rating (Compliant; Largely Compliant; Partially Compliant; Non-compliant) is attributed to each element, alongside an overall rating. The draft report is discussed and approved by the Peer Review Group, and adopted by all Forum members. Where areas of weakness are identified during the review, reports include recommendations setting out improvements jurisdictions need to make in order to reach the international standard. The peer review reports are published and made publicly available.

A first round of reviews was conducted for all member jurisdictions and jurisdictions relevant to the work of the Forum, and ended in 2016. Then, the 2010 Terms of Reference used to conduct the reviews were strengthened to integrate new principles, such as the availability of beneficial ownership information, and became the 2016 Terms of Reference. The Forum is currently in the middle of its second round of reviews.

Since 2009 it has classified tax havens into a "blacklist" of non-committers and a "graylist" (or "greylist") of non-implementers of the request-based "internationally agreed tax standard". The terms blacklist and graylist are not used by the Forum but by news services like Reuters, the BBC and the Congressional Research Service.

=== Automatic Exchange of Information ===
In 2014, the Global Forum adopted the Standard for Automatic Exchange of Financial Account Information in Tax Matters (the AEOI Standard), developed by the OECD working with G20 countries. The AEOI Standard requires financial institutions to automatically disclose information on financial accounts they maintain for non-residents to their tax authorities under the globally-agreed Common Reporting Standard (CRS), who in turn exchange this information with the tax authorities of the account holders’ country of residence.

To be able to exchange information under the AEOI Standard, jurisdictions are asked to:

- Introduce domestic rules requiring their financial institutions to collect and report the data to be exchanges
- Put in place international agreements with each if their partners to deliver the widespread networks necessary for automatic exchange
- Put in place the technical solutions to link into the Common Transmission System (CTS) that was put in place by the OECD’s Forum on Tax Administration and managed by the Global Forum

To deliver a level playing field, the Global Forum launched a commitment process under which 100 jurisdictions committed to implement the AEOI Standard and exchanges commenced accordingly in 2017. In 2018, a total of 93 jurisdictions exchanged information under the AEOI Standard. For 2019, a total of 102 jurisdictions are committed to undertake exchanges under the AEOI Standard.

=== Budget ===
The 2009 estimate of a budget was 2.9 million. It was raised by a flat fee of 15000 euros for each of the members plus a fee based on the overall GNP with an abatement of 450 USD/inhabitant.

== History ==
=== Precursors ===
In April 1998 an OECD report acknowledged that tax havens erode the tax base of other countries and undermine the fairness of tax systems, diminishing global welfare. It noted that tax havens were expanding at an exponential rate. The report focused on tax havens in the Caribbean who were not OECD members, and the OECD was thus criticized for not addressing tax havens who were its members. A second report in 2000 included a blacklist of 35 secrecy jurisdictions - all outside the OECD - and a threat of defensive measures against them, with backing from the United States under the Clinton administration.

=== Creation (2000) and first years ===
In 2000, the Global Forum was created with 32 members. Efforts to move against tax evasion in tax havens were quickly "bogged down in arcane haggling", including by a working group between tax havens and the OECD set up at the suggestion of the Commonwealth. In the United States, The Heritage Foundation criticized the move as a European effort to limit competition among tax jurisdictions. The new U.S. administration of George Bush and his first treasury secretary Paul O'Neill stated in May 2001 that the OECD's efforts were "not in line with the administration's priorities". The OECD gave in and announced it had no intention to pursue "defensive measures" against tax havens.

After the September 11, 2001, attacks the United States wanted better cooperation from tax havens on terrorist financing, but was reluctant to tackle tax evasion forcefully. Since the two practices are very similar, the United States only asked the OECD to require tax havens to provide information on request under very narrow conditions, which became the OECD's model for information on tax exchange. As a result, for example Jersey, an important tax haven, provided information to the United States in only five or six cases over a period of seven years.

=== Stepping-up of efforts after the 2008 financial crisis ===
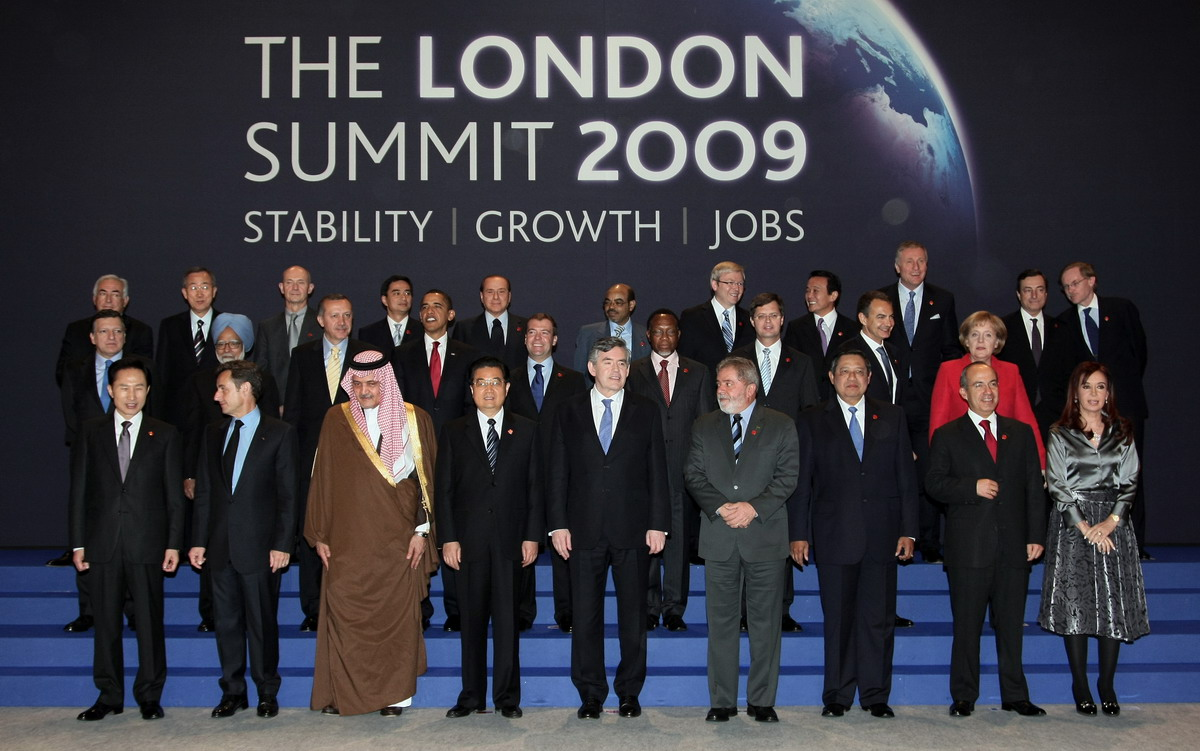
Leaders of the G-20 countries at the London Summit in 2009

The activities against tax havens were only expanded after the 2008 financial crisis. At the April 2009 G-20 London summit tax havens were divided into a "blacklist" of non-committers and a "graylist" of non-implementers, based on compliance with the request-based "internationally agreed tax standard". The actual list included three categories:

1. 40 countries and territories substantially implemented the standard
2. 38 countries and territories committed to but had not yet substantially implemented the standard
3. 4 countries had not committed to the standard.

The list of non-implementers initially included, among others, Austria, Belgium, Luxembourg and Switzerland. The list of non-committed included Costa Rica, Malaysia, the Philippines and Uruguay. Within five days Costa Rica, Malaysia, the Philippines and Uruguay made "a full commitment to exchange information to the OECD standards" and were removed from the "blacklist" which was thus empty. Panama was ‘white listed’ because it signed a tax information exchange agreement (TIEA) with France. The British Virgin Islands and the Cayman Islands were white listed by August 2009. No G-20 country was on the greylist of non-implementers, prompting Luxembourg Prime Minister Jean-Claude Juncker to criticise it for failing to include various states of the USA which provide incorporation infrastructure indistinguishable from the tax havens on the G-20 blacklist. Der Spiegel called the list "The World's Shortest Blacklist" and "the Fight against Tax Havens Is a Sham".

At a meeting in Mexico in September 2009, the Global Forum was restructured and received its own Secretariat. The main decisions were:

- Agree on restructuring the OECD Global Forum to expand its membership and ensure its members participate on an equal footing;
- Agree on how to establish an in-depth peer review process to monitor and review progress made towards full and effective exchange of information; and
- Identify mechanisms to speed-up the negotiation and conclusion of agreements to exchange information and to enable developing countries to benefit from the new more cooperative tax environment.

=== Expansion of exchange of information ===
In March 2010, international efforts were stepped up when the U.S. Congress passed the Foreign Account Tax Compliance Act (FATCA) which forces foreign financial firms to disclose their American clients. Also in 2010, the 1988 Convention on Mutual Administrative Assistance in Tax Matters was amended to include automated exchange of tax information, a key instrument in fighting tax evasion, and expanding it to developing countries. In 2013, a working group was formed to promote the automated exchange of tax information.

In July 2014, the Forum published standards for Automatic Exchange of Financial Account Information, commonly known as the Common Reporting Standard (CRS).

By November 2015, more than 90 members have committed to go beyond Exchange of Information on Request and to implement Automatic Exchange of Information. An international framework agreement, the Common Reporting Standard Multilateral Competent Authority Agreement (CRS MCAA), specifies the details of what information will be exchanged and when. Since the agreement is a framework agreement, it only comes into effect for each signatory after it has confirmed that it has undertaken certain steps such as passing national legislation. By 2023, more than 120 countries had made commitments to adopt the rules.

In 2018, the OECD has published Model Mandatory Disclosure Rules for CRS Avoidance Arrangements and Opaque Offshore Structures. These rules require intermediaries, like tax advisors, law firms and others to report to their domestic tax authority if they advise on ways to circumvent reporting under the CRS. As of January 2023, 17 jurisdictions have committed to implementing these rules, although all 27 EU Member States and the UK have already implemented these rules as part of an amendment to the Directive on Administrative Co-Operation.

In 2021, the OECD agreed an International Exchange Framework for information held by Digital Platforms. This requires digital platforms who are connect buyers and sellers involved in the rental of accommodation, rental of transportation, provision of personal services and (optionally) the sale of goods, to report information on sellers for exchange. 25 jurisdictions have committed to the adoption of these rules globally.

In 2022, the OECD agreed the Crypto-Assets Reporting Framework for the exchange of information on transactions in cryptocurrencies and other digital assets. No formal date for adoption has been agreed as at September 2023, although the EU has committed to a 2026 start date for its members.

== Members and observers ==
Member tax jurisdictions Interest in membership

=== Members ===
At its founding in 2000, the Forum had 32 member tax jurisdictions, and it had 90 members in September 2009. In November 2015, the Forum had 128 member tax jurisdictions and the European Union, in November 2019 it had 158 members, and as of March 2026 it has 173 members:

- European Union

Tax jurisdictions

- Albania
- Andorra
- Anguilla
- Antigua and Barbuda
- Argentina
- Aruba
- Australia
- Austria
- Azerbaijan
- Bahamas
- Bahrain
- Barbados
- Belgium
- Belize
- Benin
- Bermuda
- Bosnia and Herzegovina
- Botswana
- Brazil
- British Virgin Islands
- Brunei Darussalam
- Bulgaria
- Burkina Faso
- Cabo Verde
- Cambodia
- Cameroon
- Canada
- Cayman Islands
- Chad
- Chile
- China
- Colombia
- Cook Islands
- Costa Rica
- Côte d'Ivoire
- Croatia
- Curaçao
- Cyprus
- Czech Republic
- Denmark
- Djibouti
- Dominica
- Dominican Republic
- Ecuador
- Egypt
- El Salvador
- Estonia
- Eswatini
- Faroe Islands
- Finland
- France
- Gabon
- Georgia
- Germany
- Ghana
- Gibraltar
- Greece
- Greenland
- Grenada
- Guatemala
- Guernsey
- Guinea
- Guyana
- Haiti
- Honduras
- Hong Kong
- Hungary
- Iceland
- India
- Indonesia
- Ireland
- Isle of Man
- Israel
- Italy
- Jamaica
- Japan
- Jersey
- Jordan
- Republic of Kazakhstan
- Kenya
- South Korea
- Kuwait
- Republic of Latvia
- Lebanon
- Lesotho
- Liberia
- Liechtenstein
- Lithuania
- Luxembourg
- Macau
- Madagascar
- Malaysia
- Maldives
- Malta
- Marshall Islands
- Mauritania
- Mauritius
- Mexico
- Monaco
- Mongolia
- Montenegro
- Montserrat
- Morocco
- Namibia
- Nauru
- Netherlands
- Nepal
- New Zealand
- Niger
- Nigeria
- Niue
- North Macedonia
- Norway
- Oman
- Pakistan
- Panama
- Papua New Guinea
- Paraguay
- Peru
- Philippines
- Poland
- Portugal
- Qatar
- Romania
- Russian Federation
- Rwanda
- Saint Kitts and Nevis
- Saint Lucia
- Saint Vincent and the Grenadines
- Samoa
- San Marino
- Saudi Arabia
- Seychelles
- Singapore
- Sint Maarten
- Slovak Republic
- Slovenia
- South Africa
- Spain
- Sweden
- Switzerland
- Tanzania
- Thailand
- Togo
- Trinidad and Tobago
- Tunisia
- Turkey
- Turks and Caicos Islands
- Uganda
- Ukraine
- United Arab Emirates
- United Kingdom
- United States
- Uruguay
- Vanuatu

=== Observers ===
As of March 2026 there are 23 observers:

- African Development Bank
- African Tax Administration Forum (ATAF)
- African Union Commission (AUC)
- Asian Development Bank
- Asian Infrastructure Investment Bank (AIIB)
- Caribbean Community (CARICOM)
- Cercle de réflexion et d’échange des dirigeants des administrations fiscales (CREDAF)
- Commonwealth Secretariat
- Council of Europe Development Bank
- European Bank for Reconstruction and Development
- European Investment Bank
- Financial Action Task Force (FATF)
- Inter-American Center of Tax Administrations (CIAT)
- Inter-American Development Bank (IDB)
- International Finance Corporation (IFC)
- International Monetary Fund (IMF)
- Intra-European Organisation of Tax Administrations (IOTA)
- Pacific Islands Tax Administrators Association (PITAA)
- Study Group on Asia-Pacific Tax Administration and Research (SGATAR)
- United Nations
- West African Tax Administration Forum (WATAF-FAFOA)
- World Bank Group
- World Customs Organization

== Compliance by country ==
The forum reviews compliance of its member tax jurisdictions separately for the two standards, the more limited exchange of information on request and the more comprehensive automated exchange of information.

More than 80 countries and territories were not (yet) members of the Global Forum as of November 2015 and are thus not included in the lists below. Notable non-members include Belarus and Serbia in Europe; Colombia and Venezuela in Latin America; Ethiopia, Algeria and many smaller countries in Africa; as well as Iran, Myanmar, North Korea and Vietnam in Asia. All important tax havens, however, are members of the Global Forum - the 30 countries topping the Financial Secrecy Index in 2013 were all members as of 2015.

=== Exchange of Information on Request ===
The Global Forum's peer review process examines both the legal and regulatory aspects of exchange (Phase 1 reviews) and the exchange of information in practice (Phase 2). The peer reviews cover only the limited exchange of information on request.

==== 2013 Ratings ====
At its meeting in Jakarta in November 2013, the Global Forum assigned the ratings for the first 50 jurisdictions that had completed their Phase 1 and Phase 2 reviews. The Phase 1 review found that 14 countries and territories had gaps in their legal framework and were not allowed to move to Phase 2 unless they improved their legal framework.

The ten countries and territories that were at the top of the Financial Secrecy Index 2013, an index established by the NGO Tax Justice Network and that also takes into account the size of the transactions in a tax haven, were categorized as follows: Lebanons and Switzerland had not completed Phase 1. Luxembourg was listed as Category D, Jersey as Category C, and the Cayman Islands, Germany, Hong Kong, Singapore as well as the United States were listed as Category B. Japan was the only country classified as one of the ten major tax havens by the Tax Justice Network that was listed in Category A.

The following jurisdictions are not eligible to move to Phase 2 review until they act on recommendations to improve their legal and regulatory framework:

Country/Region
Botswana
Brunei
Dominica
Guatemala
Lebanon
Liberia
Marshall Islands
Nauru
Niue
Panama
Switzerland
Trinidad and Tobago
United Arab Emirates
Vanuatu

Among those countries that had created an adequate legal framework and thus had moved to Phase 2, four countries - including Luxembourg - were found to be non-compliant with their own legal framework (grade D). Two countries - Austria and Turkey - were only partially compliant (grade C).

Country/Region	Overall Rating
Australia	A - Compliant
Belgium	A - Compliant
Canada	A - Compliant
China	A - Compliant
Denmark	A - Compliant
Finland	A - Compliant
France	A - Compliant
Iceland	A - Compliant
India	A - Compliant
Ireland	A - Compliant
Isle of Man	A - Compliant
Japan	A - Compliant
Korea	A - Compliant
New Zealand	A - Compliant
Norway	A - Compliant
South Africa	A - Compliant
Spain	A - Compliant
Sweden	A - Compliant
Argentina	B - Largely Compliant
Bahamas	B - Largely Compliant
Bahrain	B - Largely Compliant
Bermuda	B - Largely Compliant
Brazil	B - Largely Compliant
Cayman Islands	B - Largely Compliant
Estonia	B - Largely Compliant
Germany	B - Largely Compliant
Greece	B - Largely Compliant
Guernsey	B - Largely Compliant
Hong Kong	B - Largely Compliant
Italy	B - Largely Compliant
Jamaica	B - Largely Compliant
Jersey	B - Largely Compliant
Macau	B - Largely Compliant
Malta	B - Largely Compliant
Mauritius	B - Largely Compliant
Monaco	B - Largely Compliant
Netherlands	B - Largely Compliant
Philippines	B - Largely Compliant
Qatar	B - Largely Compliant
San Marino	B - Largely Compliant
Singapore	B - Largely Compliant
Turks and Caicos Islands	B - Largely Compliant
United Kingdom	B - Largely Compliant
United States	B - Largely Compliant
Austria	C - Partially Compliant
Turkey	C - Partially Compliant
Cyprus	D - Non Compliant
Luxembourg	D - Non Compliant
Seychelles	D - Non Compliant
British Virgin Islands	D - Non Compliant

==== 2015 Ratings ====
As of October 31, 2015 the ratings were as follows: 8 countries still had deficiencies in their legal framework. 25 countries, including Switzerland, had completed their legal framework (Phase 1 review), but had not yet had a Phase 2 review. Among the countries and territories that had passed a Phase 2 review, none was rated non-compliant (Grade D) any more. Nine countries were rated as only partially compliant (Grade C), still including Austria and Turkey.

The ten countries and territories that were at the top of the Financial Secrecy Index 2015, an index established by the NGO Tax Justice Network and that also takes into account the size of the transactions in a tax haven, were categorized as follows: Lebanon had not completed Phase 1. Switzerland and the UAE had completed Phase 1 and were awaiting Phase 2. Luxembourg and Jersey had moved up to Category B, along with the Cayman Islands, Germany, Hong Kong, Singapore as well as the United States. Bahrain, which had not been among the top ten tax havens in 2013, was also in Category B. Japan and Jersey had improved their transparency and were not any more among the ten most important tax havens, moving to number 12 and 16 respectively.

The following jurisdictions are not eligible to move to Phase 2 review until they act on recommendations to improve their legal and regulatory framework:

Country/Region
Micronesia
Guatemala
Kazakhstan
Lebanon
Liberia
Nauru
Trinidad and Tobago
Vanuatu

The following jurisdictions have completed the Phase 1 review, i.e. their legal framework had been reviewed and they were eligible to move to Phase 2:

Country/Region
Albania
Azerbaijan
Botswana
Brunei
Burkina Faso
Cameroon
Dominica
Dominican Republic
El Salvador
Gabon
Georgia
Kenya
Lesotho
Marshall Islands
Mauritania
Morocco
Nigeria
Niue
Pakistan
Panama
Saudi Arabia
Senegal
Switzerland
Uganda
United Arab Emirates

The following countries and territories had passed a Phase 2 review:

Country/Region	Overall Rating
Australia	A - Compliant
Belgium	A - Compliant
Canada	A - Compliant
China	A - Compliant
Colombia	A - Compliant
Denmark	A - Compliant
Finland	A - Compliant
France	A - Compliant
Iceland	A - Compliant
India	A - Compliant
Ireland	A - Compliant
Isle of Man	A - Compliant
Japan	A - Compliant
Korea	A - Compliant
Lithuania	A - Compliant
Mexico	A - Compliant
New Zealand	A - Compliant
Norway	A - Compliant
Slovenia	A - Compliant
South Africa	A - Compliant
Spain	A - Compliant
Sweden	A - Compliant
Argentina	B - Largely Compliant
Bahamas	B - Largely Compliant
Bahrain	B - Largely Compliant
Belize	B - Largely Compliant
Bermuda	B - Largely Compliant
Brazil	B - Largely Compliant
British Virgin Islands	D - Largely Compliant
Cayman Islands	B - Largely Compliant
Chile	B - Largely Compliant
Cook Islands	B - Largely Compliant
Cyprus	D - Largely Compliant
Czech Republic	D - Largely Compliant
Estonia	B - Largely Compliant
Germany	B - Largely Compliant
Greece	B - Largely Compliant
Grenada	B - Largely Compliant
Guernsey	B - Largely Compliant
Hong Kong	B - Largely Compliant
Hungary	B - Largely Compliant
Italy	B - Largely Compliant
Jamaica	B - Largely Compliant
Jersey	B - Largely Compliant
Latvia	B - Largely Compliant
Liechtenstein	B - Largely Compliant
Luxembourg	B - Largely Compliant
Macau	B - Largely Compliant
Malta	B - Largely Compliant
Mauritius	B - Largely Compliant
Monaco	B - Largely Compliant
Netherlands	B - Largely Compliant
Philippines	B - Largely Compliant
Poland	B - Largely Compliant
Portugal	B - Largely Compliant
Qatar	B - Largely Compliant
Russia	B - Largely Compliant
Saint Kitts and Nevis	B - Largely Compliant
Saint Vincent and the Grenadines	B - Largely Compliant
San Marino	B - Largely Compliant
Seychelles	B - Largely Compliant
Singapore	B - Largely Compliant
Slovak Republic	B - Largely Compliant
Turks and Caicos Islands	B - Largely Compliant
United Kingdom	B - Largely Compliant
United States	B - Largely Compliant
Uruguay	B - Largely Compliant
Austria	C - Partially Compliant
Costa Rica	C - Partially Compliant
Curacao	C - Partially Compliant
Indonesia	C - Partially Compliant
Israel	C - Partially Compliant
Saint Lucia	C -Partially Compliant
Samoa	C - Partially Compliant
Sint Maarten	C - Partially Compliant
Turkey	C - Partially Compliant

=== 2016 Ratings ===
The following jurisdictions have completed the Phase 1 review, i.e. their legal framework had been reviewed and they were eligible to move to Phase 2:

Country/Region
Croatia
Lebanon
Liberia
Nauru
Peru
Tunisia
Ukraine
Vanuatu

The following countries and territories had passed a Phase 2 review:

Country/Region	Overall Rating
Albania	B - Largely Compliant
Azerbaijan	B - Largely Compliant
Barbados	B - Largely Compliant
Botswana	B - Largely Compliant
Brunei Darussalam	B - Largely Compliant
Burkina Faso	B - Largely Compliant
Cameroon	B - Largely Compliant
Dominica	C - Partially Compliant
Dominican Republic	C - Partially Compliant
El Salvador	B - Largely Compliant
Gabon	B - Largely Compliant
Georgia	B - Largely Compliant
Israel	B - Largely Compliant
Kenya	B - Largely Compliant
Lesotho	B - Largely Compliant
Marshall Islands	D - Non-Compliant
Mauritania	B - Largely Compliant
Morocco	B - Largely Compliant
Nigeria	B - Largely Compliant
Niue	B - Largely Compliant
Pakistan	B - Largely Compliant
Panama	D - Not-Compliant
Romania	B - Largely Compliant
Saint Lucia	B - Largely Compliant
Saudi Arabia	B - Largely Compliant
Senegal	B - Largely Compliant
Switzerland	B - Largely Compliant
Uganda	B - Largely Compliant
United Arab Emirates	C - Partially Compliant

For the first time, a Combined review of both Phase 1 and Phase 2 was introduced as part of the review process :

Country/Region	Overall Rating
Bulgaria	B - Largely Compliant

=== 2017 Ratings ===
Starting 2017, the Global Forum started its second round of Reviews, assessing new members for the first time as well as the progress made by the jurisdictions that underwent a review in the first Round. The following jurisdictions have completed a Combined review of both Phase 1 (legal and regulatory framework) and Phase 2 (implementation)

Country/Region	Overall Rating
Australia	B - Largely Compliant
Bermuda	B - Largely Compliant
Canada	B - Largely Compliant
Cayman Islands	B - Largely Compliant
Curacao	C - Partially Compliant
Germany	B - Largely Compliant
India	B - Largely Compliant
Ireland	B - Largely Compliant
Isle of Man	A - Compliant
Italy	A - Compliant
Jamaica	C - Partially Compliant
Jersey	A - Compliant
Mauritius	A - Compliant
Norway	A - Compliant
Qatar	B - Largely Compliant

=== 2018 Ratings ===
The following jurisdictions have completed a Combined review of both Phase 1 (legal and regulatory framework) and Phase 2 (implementation)

Country/Region	Overall Rating
Aruba	B - Largely Compliant
Austria	B - Largely Compliant
Bahamas	B - Largely Compliant
Bahrain	A - Compliant
Belgium	B - Largely Compliant
Brazil	B - Largely Compliant
Estonia	A - Compliant
France	A - Compliant
Ghana	C - Partially Compliant
Guernsey	A - Compliant
Hungary	B - Largely Compliant
Indonesia	B - Largely Compliant
Jamaica	B - Largely Compliant
Japan	
Kazakhstan	C - Partially Compliant
Monaco	A - Compliant
New Zealand	A - Compliant
Philippines	B - Largely Compliant
Saint Kitts and Nevis	B - Largely Compliant
San Marino	A - Compliant
Singapore	A - Compliant
United Kingdom	B - Largely Compliant
United States	B - Largely Compliant

=== Automated Exchange of Information ===
As of September 2023, 120 countries have committed to adopting the Common Reporting Standard:

Jurisdiction	Commitment to first exchanges	Primary legislation	Secondary legislation
Albania	2021	✔	✔
Andorra	2018	✔	✔
Anguilla	2017	✔	✔
Antigua and Barbuda	2018	✔	✔
Argentina	2017	✔	✔
Armenia	2025		
Aruba	2018	✔	✔
Australia	2018	✔	
Austria	2018	✔	✔
Azerbaijan	2018	✔	✔
Bahamas	2018	✔	✔
Bahrain	2018	✔	✔
Barbados	2018	✔	✔
Belgium	2017	✔	✔
Belize	2018	✔	✔
Bermuda	2017	✔	✔
Brazil	2018	✔	✔
British Virgin Islands	2017	✔	
Brunei Darussalam	2018	✔	✔
Bulgaria	2017	✔	
Canada	2018	✔	
Cayman Islands	2017	✔	✔
Chile	2018	✔	
China (People's Republic of)	2018	✔	✔
Colombia	2017	✔	✔
Cook Islands	2018	✔	✔
Costa Rica	2018	✔	✔
Croatia	2017	✔	✔
Curaçao	2018	✔	✔
Cyprus	2017	✔	✔
Czech Republic	2017	✔	✔
Denmark	2017	✔	✔
Dominica	2018	✔	
Ecuador	2021	✔	✔
Estonia	2017	✔	✔
Faroe Islands	2017	✔	✔
Finland	2017	✔	✔
France	2017	✔	✔
Georgia	2024		
Germany	2017	✔	
Ghana	2019	✔	
Gibraltar	2017	✔	✔
Greece	2017	✔	✔
Greenland	2018	✔	✔
Grenada	2018	✔	✔
Guernsey	2017	✔	✔
Hong Kong (China)	2018	✔	
Hungary	2017	✔	
Iceland	2017	✔	✔
India	2017	✔	✔
Indonesia	2018	✔	✔
Ireland	2017	✔	✔
Isle of Man	2017	✔	✔
Israel	2018	✔	✔
Italy	2017	✔	✔
Jamaica	2022	✔	
Japan	2018	✔	✔
Jersey	2017	✔	✔
Jordan	2023		
Kazakhstan	2021		
Kenya	2024	✔	✔
Korea	2017	✔	✔
Kuwait	2019	✔	
Latvia	2017	✔	✔
Lebanon	2018	✔	✔
Liechtenstein	2017	✔	✔
Lithuania	2017	✔	✔
Luxembourg	2017	✔	✔
Macau (China)	2018	✔	✔
Malaysia	2018	✔	✔
Maldives	2022	✔	✔
Malta	2017	✔	✔
Marshall Islands	2018	✔	✔
Mauritius	2018	✔	✔
Mexico	2017	✔	✔
Moldova	2024	✔ and ✔	
Monaco	2018	✔	
Mongolia	2026		
Montenegro	2023		
Montserrat	2017	✔	✔
Morocco	2025		
Nauru	2018	✔	✔
Netherlands	2017	✔	✔
New Zealand	2018	✔	
Nigeria	2020	✔	✔
Niue	2018	✔	✔
Norway	2017	✔	✔
Oman	2020	✔	✔
Pakistan	2018	✔ and ✔	✔
Panama	2018	✔	✔
Peru	2020	✔	✔
Poland	2017	✔	
Portugal	2017	✔	✔
Qatar	2018		
Romania	2017	✔	✔
Russian Federation	2018	✔	✔
Rwanda	2025	✔	
Saint Kitts and Nevis	2018	✔	✔
Saint Lucia	2018	✔	
Saint Vincent and the Grenadines	2018	✔	✔
Samoa	2018	✔	
San Marino	2017	✔	✔
Saudi Arabia	2018	✔	✔
Seychelles	2017	✔	✔
Singapore	2018	✔	✔
Sint Maarten	2018	✔	
Slovak Republic	2017	✔	✔
Slovenia	2017	✔	✔
South Africa	2017	✔	✔
Spain	2017	✔	✔
Sweden	2017	✔	✔
Switzerland	2018	✔	✔
Thailand	2023		
Trinidad and Tobago	2018		
Tunisia	2024		
Turkey	2018	✔	✔
Turks and Caicos Islands	2017		✔
Uganda	2023		
Ukraine	2024	✔	✔
United Arab Emirates	2018	✔	✔
United Kingdom	2017	✔	✔
Uruguay	2018	✔	✔
Vanuatu	2018	✔	✔

== See also ==
- FATF blacklist
- List of offshore financial centres
- Financial Secrecy Index
- European Union withholding tax
- Corporate tax havens
