= CARF =

The acronym CARF can mean multiple things:

- Calcium-responsive transcription factor, a protein encoded by the gene CARF
- Campaign Against Racism and Fascism, a British pressure group
- Canadian Amateur Radio Federation
- Commission on Accreditation of Rehabilitation Facilities
- Crypto-Asset Reporting Framework
