= Henrik Kleven =

Danish economist (born 1971)

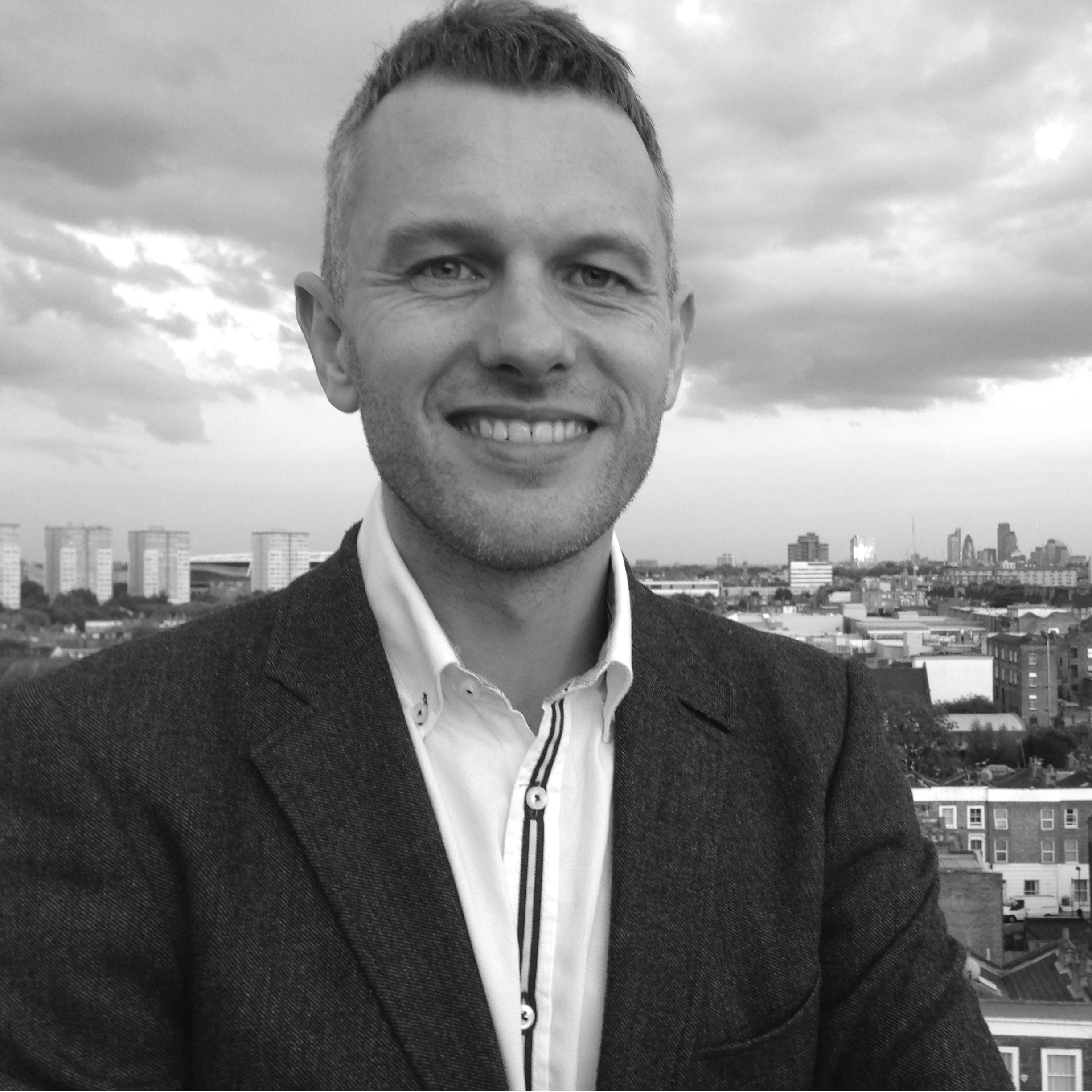
- Kleven in 2014
- Born: April 28, 1971 (age 55); Copenhagen, Denmark

Academic background
- Education: University of Copenhagen (B.Sc., M.Sc., Ph.D.)
- Thesis: Taxation, Time Allocation, and Economic Efficiency (2003)
- Doctoral advisor: Peter Birch Sørensen

Academic work
- Discipline: Public Economics, Public Finance, Labor Economics, Gender Economics
- Institutions: Princeton University; London School of Economics; University of Copenhagen
- Notable ideas: Sufficient Statistics, Bunching, Third-Party Reporting, Child Penalties, Administrative Data
- Website: henrikkleven.com

Henrik Kleven (born April 28, 1971) is a Danish economist, currently the Lynn Bendheim Thoman, Class of 1977, and Robert Bendheim, Class of 1937, Professor of Economics and Public Affairs at Princeton University. He earned his Ph.D. from the University of Copenhagen in 2003 and has held faculty positions at the London School of Economics and at the University of Copenhagen. Kleven has served in major editorial roles: he was Chief Editor of the Journal of Public Economics (until 2017) and co-editor of the American Economic Review (until 2021). He is a Research Associate of the National Bureau of Economic Research (NBER), Research Fellow at the Centre for Economic Policy Research (CEPR), and elected Fellow of the Econometric Society. His research combines economic theory and empirical evidence to study the impact and design of public policies, including tax policy, welfare programs, and family policy. He has a separate interest in gender inequality, focusing on the role of child penalties. This work has been published in leading academic journals and is regularly cited in academic and media discussions. It has influenced policy debates in multiple countries.

== Research ==
Henrik Kleven’s research links theory and data—often using large administrative datasets from Scandinavian countries—to produce policy-relevant work on taxation, poverty alleviation, tax enforcement, and inequality, especially gender inequality. He is particularly known for his contributions to research on optimal taxation, sufficient statistics, bunching, tax evasion, migration, and child penalties.

=== Gender Inequality and Child Penalties ===
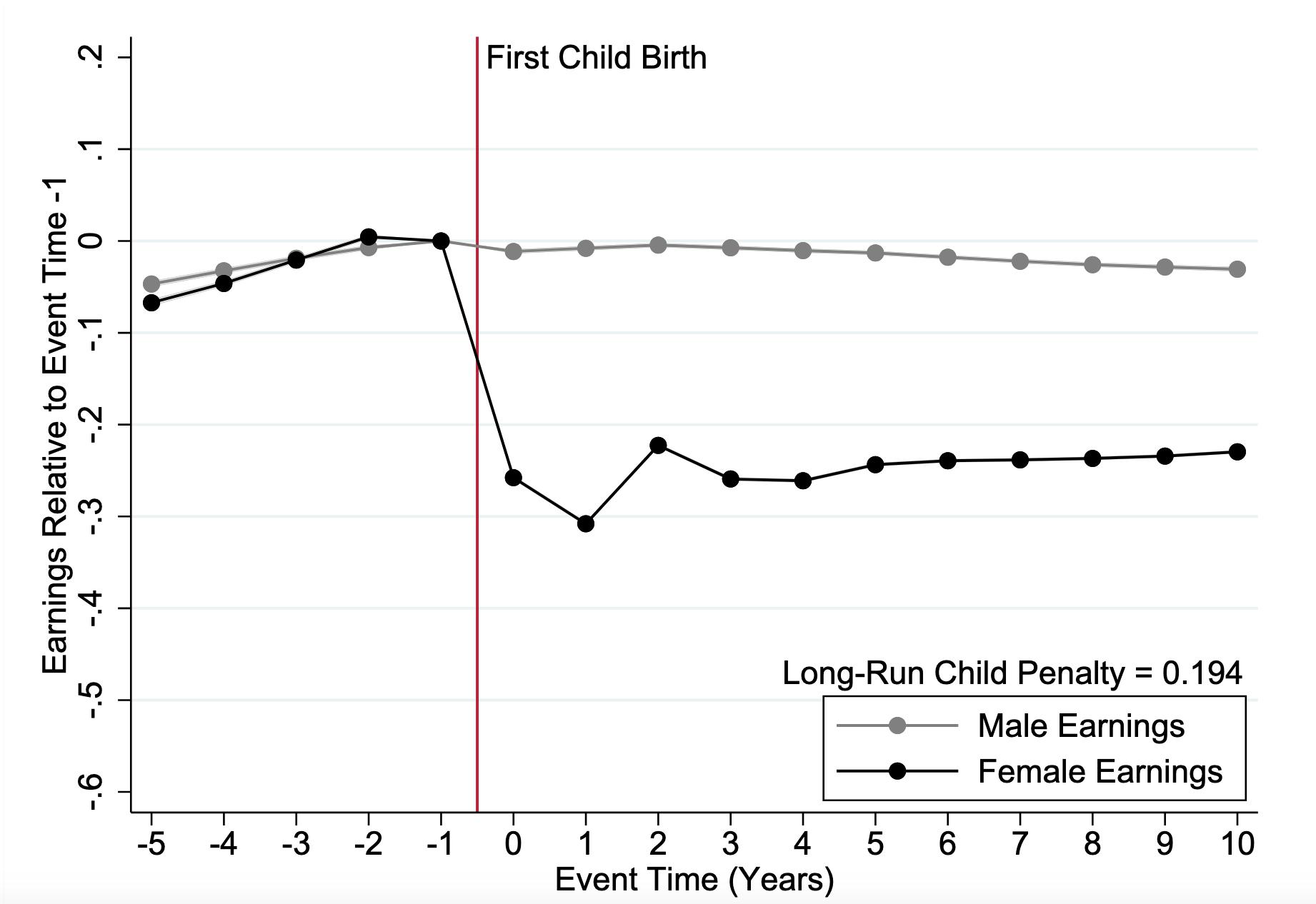
This figure presents one of the first empirical estimates of the child penalty for Denmark. Source: Kleven, Landais & Søgaard (2019).

Kleven’s research, together with Camille Landais and others, has reframed gender inequality research to focus on the impact of parenthood. They introduced the concept of child penalties—the negative impact of childbirth on women’s labor market outcomes relative to men’s—using administrative data and an event-study method has become the standard in the literature. Kleven’s empirical findings consistently demonstrate that child penalties are large, persistent, and widespread. In Denmark, childbirth is responsible for a long-run gender gap in earnings of about 20%, explaining more than 80% of earnings inequality between men and women. Expanding the analysis to countries around the globe, the Child Penalty Atlas project documents substantial variation across 134 countries, with larger penalties in richer nations than in poorer nations—highlighting the role of economic development and labor market structure. Penalties persist even in countries with generous family policies. Kleven’s papers show that child penalties are driven by parenthood itself—not by biology or comparative advantage. (1) Adoptive mothers face similar penalties to biological mothers, and women with high earnings capacity face similar penalties to those with low earnings capacity, contradicting Becker’s specialization theory. (2) Family policies such as parental leave and childcare have short-term impacts, but play a limited role for long-term child penalties. (3) Gender norms play a central role: societies that view caregiving as a maternal responsibility and career as a paternal responsibility have larger child penalties. (4) Cultural persistence is confirmed by Kleven’s 2025 study of U.S. movers and immigrants, showing that penalties reflect the norms of individuals’ regions of origin. (5) Labor market rigidity further amplifies disparities by penalizing mothers who seek flexibility after childbirth.

=== Optimal Taxation and Sufficient Statistics Approach ===
Kleven’s research connects economic theory with empirical analysis using the so-called “sufficient statistics” approach. This approach simplifies policy evaluation by relying on a few measurable behavioral responses (“elasticities”) instead of estimating a fully specified structural model. Kleven (2021) shows that the validity of this approach rests on three key assumptions: small policy changes, government intervention as the sole market imperfection, and simplifications of preferences and the environment. Under these conditions, welfare impacts and optimal policies can be expressed as simple formulas that depend on just a few elasticities, offering clear guidance to researchers and policymakers. Beyond the general theory, Kleven and co-authors have applied the sufficient statistics approach to several domains. Applications include: (1) the Marginal Cost of Public Funds, MCPF; (2) the optimal income taxation of married couples; and (3) the optimal taxation of top earners in a world with social externalities.

=== Behavioral Responses to Taxation and Welfare Programs ===
Kleven’s research explores how taxes and welfare programs shape individual behavior—central to designing policies that balance equality and efficiency. His work relies on range of quasi-experimental methods: difference-in-differences, event studies, regression discontinuity and bunching methods, he shows that individual earnings cluster: around tax thresholds, revealing sensitivity to incentives. His work has evaluated labor supply and taxable income responses to taxation, as well as capital and wealth accumulation responses. In a recent paper, he reappraised the effects of the Earned Income Tax Credit (EITC) on employment rates, showing that the program has had much smaller effects than traditionally thought.

=== Tax-Induced Migration ===
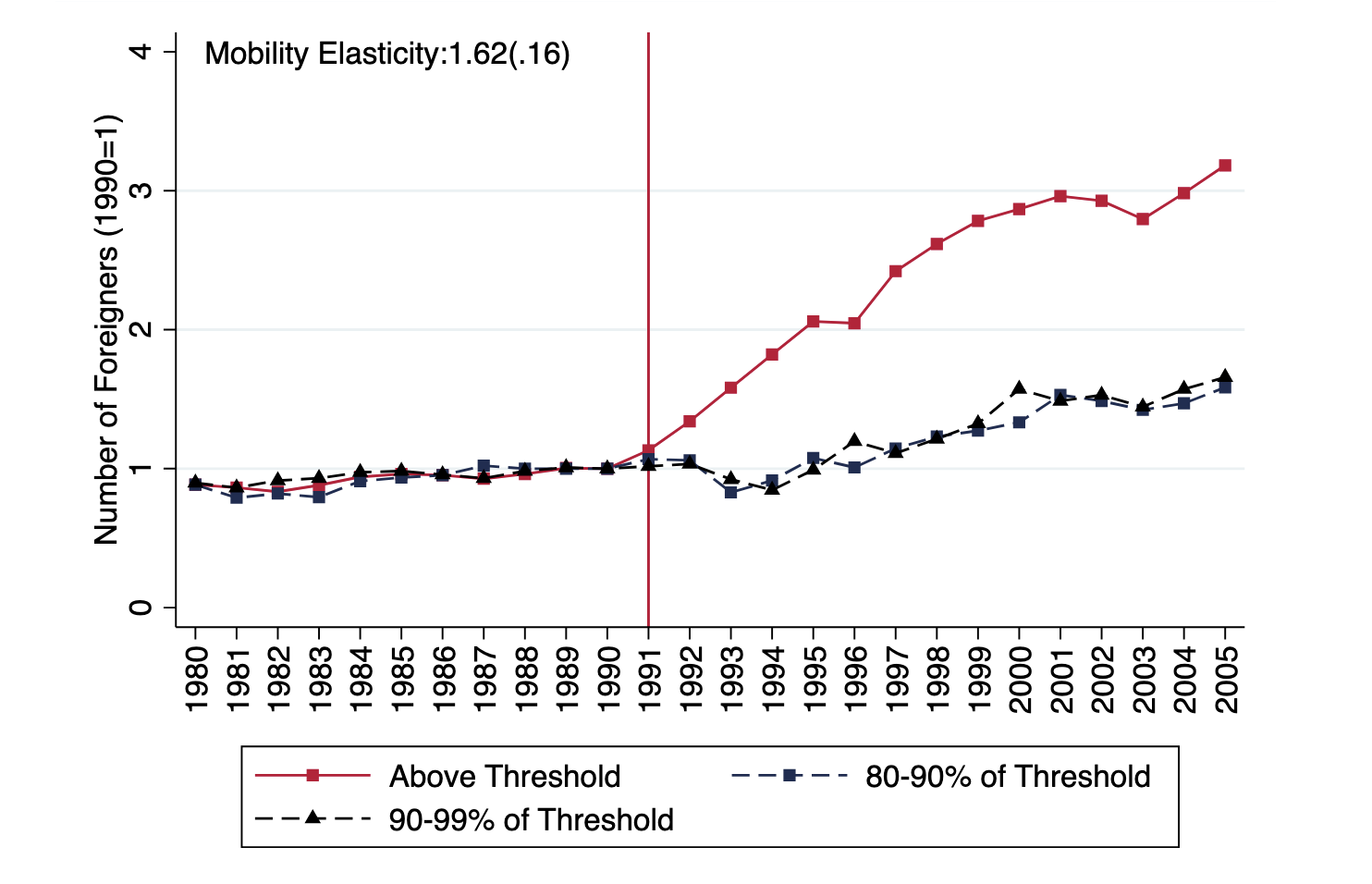
Migration and Wage Effects of Taxing Top Earners: Evidence from the Foreigners' Tax Scheme in Denmark

Tax-induced mobility challenges the ability of governments to tax top earners and sustain generous welfare models. Kleven’s research documents how income taxes, wealth taxes, and welfare benefits shape mobility at the top and bottom of the distribution. His work has shown that high-income and high-worth individuals respond to income and wealth taxes by relocating across countries. His work also shows that low-income migrants respond to the generosity of welfare benefits when choosing location—the so-called “welfare magnet” effect. Together, these findings highlight the need to account for cross-border spillovers when designing redistribution.

=== Tax Evasion and Third-Party Reporting ===
Why do people comply with taxes? Kleven’s research shows that successful enforcement depends critically on the use of third-party information. In a large audit experiment conducted with the Danish tax authorities, Kleven et al. (2011) find near-perfect compliance when income is double-reported by employers or financial institutions, and almost full evasion when income is purely self-reported. The high compliance rates of modern economies can be explained by the fact that most income generated is subject to third-party information trails. Building on this, Kleven et al. (2016) frame firms as “fiscal intermediaries” that enable states to raise substantial revenue. Compliance is also shaped by social incentives: a field experiment in Germany finds that many individuals pay out of intrinsic motivation, and these motivations are not undermined by audit threats (Dwenger et al., 2016). Together, these results show that institutions—formal enforcement and informal norms—are central to explaining compliance.

In developing countries, third-party reporting and digital records are often limited. Kleven et al. (2016) show that, in such contexts, tax bases are narrow until economic development—and the associated changes in firm structure—allows for effective third-party reporting and an expansion of state capacity. In low-income contexts, Best et al. (2015) show that turnover taxes, while distortionary, substantially increase revenue. Kleven and Waseem (2013) find that tax notches—discrete jumps in tax liability at specific earnings threshold—create strong bunching, suggesting that smoother tax schedules can improve both compliance and efficiency. This paper led to a nation-wide income tax reform in Pakistan.

=== Awards and honors ===
Kleven’s honors include his election as Fellow of the Econometric Society in 2024. In 2024, he was also the recipient of the Richard Musgrave Prize (awarded by CESifo and the International Institute of Public Finance). His research has earned recognition from the American Economic Association: Kleven and co-authors won an award for the best paper published in the American Economic Journal: Applied Economics in 2020. Kleven has been invited to give the Zeuthen Lectures at Copenhagen University (2021), the Lindahl Lectures at Uppsala University (2022), and a lecture at the Nobel Symposium on Inequality in Stockholm (2022).

=== Selected Work ===
- “Children and Gender Inequality: Evidence from Denmark” (with Camille Landais and Jakob Søgaard), American Economic Journal: Applied Economics 11, 181–209, 2019.
- “Unwilling or Unable to Cheat? Evidence from a Tax Audit Experiment in Denmark” (with Martin Knudsen, Claus Kreiner, Søren Pedersen, and Emmanuel Saez), Econometrica 79, 651–692, 2011.
- “Using Notches to Uncover Optimization Frictions and Structural Elasticities: Theory and Evidence from Pakistan” (with Mazhar Waseem), Quarterly Journal of Economics 128, 669–723, 2013.
- “Child Penalties Across Countries: Evidence and Explanations” (with Camille Landais, Johanna Posch, Andreas Steinhauer, and Josef Zweimüller), AEA Papers and Proceedings 109, 122–126, 2019.
- “Bunching,” Annual Review of Economics 8, 435–464, 2016.
- “Taxation and International Migration of Superstars: Evidence from the European Football Market” (with Camille Landais and Emmanuel Saez), American Economic Review 103, 1892–1924, 2013.
