= Crypto-Asset Reporting Framework =

Global rules for tax reporting on cryptocurrency

The Crypto-Asset Reporting Framework (commonly referred to as CARF) is a global initiative led by the OECD Global Forum on Transparency and Exchange of Information for Tax Purposes which is intended to promote the automatic exchange of information between countries to tackle emerging tax evasion risks related to cryptocurrency and digital assets.

The rules will require Crypto-Asset Service Providers (CASPs) to collect information on users including individuals' tax residences and tax identification numbers and report that information to their domestic tax authority. Tax authorities will then exchange that information between themselves to assist with tax compliance, assessment and monitoring.

== History ==
Following the widespread adoption of cryptocurrency and blockchain technologies, there has been concern that they could facilitate illicit activity, including tax evasion. In a 2022 Impact Assessment:, the European Commission stated that the lack of centralised control, pseudo-anonymity and digitalised nature of cryptocurrency gave rise to elevated tax evasion risks.

The EU impact assessment report goes on to estimate that 12 million accounts may be reportable within the EU, and 100 million accounts globally.

A 2022 article in The Washington Post, highlighted similar problems in the US, indicating that even in 2014/5, more than 5 million people were trading cryptocurrencies, but fewer than 1,000 taxpayers included gains on their tax returns.

In July 2023, the International Monetary Fund indicated that "crude estimates suggest that a 20 percent tax on capital gains from crypto would have raised about $100 billion worldwide amid soaring prices in 2021". However, they went on to note that the market had since contracted, and under normal circumstances crypto taxes would "probably average less than $25 billion a year." A more detailed working paper prepared by the IMF stated that "the distinctive feature of crypto, arising from its anonymity, is naturally thought of as a particularly low probability of detection and hence particular appeal as a device for evasion".

In August 2023, a letter sent by Elizabeth Warren, Bernie Sanders, Bob Casey Jr., and Richard Blumenthal to United States Department of the Treasury and the Internal Revenue Service indicated that the US tax gap related to non-disclosure of cryptocurrency transactions was $1.5 billion in 2024, and $28 billion over 'the next 8 years'. US Treasury had previously announced rules requiring transfers of cryptocurrency to be reported due to increased risks of tax evasion.

=== OECD Global Forum response ===
In early 2022, the OECD published a consultation on a proposed package of rules called the Crypto-Asset Reporting Framework requesting comments from industry participants.

On 10 October 2022, the OECD Global forum published their final report which set out the new and amended reporting requirements covering the reporting of crypto-assets and e-money. The report also contains broader revisions to the existing Common Reporting Standard (CRS).

That report was subsequently adopted by the OECD in June 2023, and CRS and CARF together form the International Standards for Automatic Exchange of Information in Tax Matters.

As at 30 September 2023, the OECD has yet to confirm an adoption timeline for CARF, although the 27 Member States of the EU will be required to adopt the rules from 1 January 2026 onwards.

=== Adoption in the EU ===
Following the endorsement of the OECD for CARF, the European Union confirmed that it would adopt the rules beginning on 1 January 2026 for all EU Member States. That adoption will be through an amendment to the Directive on Administrative Co-operation in the field of Taxation (2011/16).

The EU's rules are intended to be aligned to the Markets in Crypto-Assets Regulation (MiCA), and as the 8th change to the DAC will be commonly known as DAC8.

The EU rules extend beyond the scope of the OECD rules as they are extraterritorial in scope; the rules will require cryptocurrency exchanges and others involved in digital assets to report on EU residents even where they are not themselves operating in the EU.

In a press release confirming the adoption of rules, Swedish Finance Minister, Elisabeth Svantesson stated:

"Today’s decision is bad news for those who have misused crypto-assets for their illegal activities, to circumvent EU sanctions or to finance terrorism and war. Doing so will no longer be possible in Europe without exposure – it is an important step forward in the fight against money laundering."

=== Potential United States participation ===
The United States does not participate in the OECD's Common Reporting Standard, instead relying on a unilateral data gathering regime known as FATCA.

However, in August 2023, US Treasury and the IRS published rules for the US's own tax information reporting on cryptocurrencies, due to take effect from 1 January 2025. Those proposed rules expressly allow for the US participating in an international exchange of information on cryptocurrencies, indicating that the US may participate in CARF. The information required for the US regime, to be reported on a new Form 1099-DA, is compatible with the information gathering requirements under the CARF.

That draft followed earlier media reports that the United States was working towards participation in CARF, which would see information collected from US-based exchanges and sent to tax authorities globally.

Notably, the US rules also apply extraterritorially to exchanges not based in the US but dealing with US persons. Therefore, in the absence of agreement between the US and OECD, the resulting rules would be similar to the CRS/FATCA split that applies to financial account reporting.

== Scope ==
Obligations under CARF apply to “Reporting Crypto-Asset Service Providers” (CASPs) which is defined as any individual or entity that as a business provides a service to “effectuate” transactions in Crypto-Assets. That definition is likely to apply to all cryptocurrency exchanges other than those that operate in a purely decentralized manner. It will also capture a wide range of other providers involved in providing Crypto-Assets.

The OECD notes that CASPs are also expected to also fall within the scope of obligated entities for FATF purposes (i.e., virtual asset service providers), so they should already be collecting and reviewing documentation from their customers, including anti-money laundering or know-your-client documentation.

Crypto-Assets are defined as assets which use cryptographically secured distributed ledger technology and which are used for payment or investment purposes. The term is defined widely, and the CARF notes that it will likely include cryptocurrencies, ERC-20 tokens, non-fungible tokens which can be traded on an exchange, as well as any other tokens or digital assets which meet the requirements. Central bank digital currency (CBDCs) are expressly excluded from inclusion in CARF, and instead will be reportable in the same way as a bank account under the Common Reporting Standard. Stablecoins are included within CARF, although specific coins may be designated in the future as out of scope of CARF and in scope of CRS in the same way as CBDCs.

=== Application to De-Fi ===
In respect of decentralized finance applications, the OECD rules apply where an entity or individual exercises sufficient control over the platform that they could comply with the due diligence and reporting requirements under CARF.

Many institutions who will be in scope of the CARF offer hybrid services to crypto-asset investors, which may mean that investors do not hold assets directly on the blockchain but rather hold them through omnibus wallets of CASPs. CARF does not require that a reportable transaction is reflected on the blockchain itself, just that there is a transaction in a crypto-asset. Accordingly, a CASP may have to report a transaction because a transaction over a relevant crypto-asset even if it did not result in a transaction on the blockchain.

== Requirements ==
CASPs are required to collect personal information from users, including a certification of the tax residence of the user and their taxpayer identification number. They are required to review the 'reasonableness' of information provided based on other information available about the user.

CASPs will report annually on 3 types of transactions.

1. Exchanges between crypto-assets and fiat currency
2. Exchanges between one or more forms of crypto-assets
3. Transfers of crypto-assets, which includes the use of crypto to pay for goods and services, and transfers to unhosted wallets

The original CARF proposal published by the OECD in March 2022 included a requirement for CASPs to report the wallet addresses as well as the value of any transfers to unhosted wallets. That element was removed from the final rules reflecting the comments submitted by industry participants, a decision that was criticised by the Tax Justice Network.

CASPs will report annually to their domestic tax authority. In the EU, the rules take effect from 1 January 2026 and therefore first reports will be submitted in 2027.

== XML Schemas and Guidance ==
On the 2 October 2024, the OECD published the XML schemas and Guidance to support the transmission of information between tax authorities for CARF and the amended Common Reporting Standard (CRS); including reporting requirements for both regulations.

First exchanges under both the CARF and the amended CRS are expected to commence in 2027.

== See also ==
- Common Reporting Standard
- Exchange of information
- Foreign Account Tax Compliance Act
- Global Forum on Transparency and Exchange of Information for Tax Purposes
