= Digital platform =

Digital platform may refer to:

- Computing platform, the environment in which a piece of software is executed
- Web portal, a specially designed website that brings information from diverse sources, like emails, online forums and search engines, together in a uniform way
- Digital platform (infrastructure), a software-based online infrastructure that facilitates interactions and transactions between users
