= Julie Cohen =

Julie Cohen may refer to:

- Julie E. Cohen, American legal scholar in intellectual property and Internet law
- Julie Cohen (documentarian), American filmmaker

== See also ==
- Julie Coin, French tennis player
- Julia Cohen, American tennis player
