= AEOI =

AEOI most commonly refers to:

- Atomic Energy Organization of Iran (AEOI)
- Automatic Exchange of Financial Account Information (AEOI), such as the OECD's Common Reporting Standard
