= Directive on Administrative Co-operation in the field of Taxation (2011/16) =

EU tax and data collection

Directive 2011/16
- European Union directive
- Title: Directive on Administrative Co-operation in the field of Taxation
- Made under: Articles 113 and 115 TFEU
- Journal reference: OJ L 64, 11.3.2011, p. 1–12

History
- Council Vote: Unanimous
- Date made: 15 February 2011

Other legislation
- Replaces: Directive 77/799/EEC
- Amended by: Council Directives 2014/107, 2015/2376, 2016/881, 2016/2258, 2018/822, 2021/514 and pending amendment by Procedure File 2022/0413

The Directive on Administrative Co-operation in the field of taxation (commonly referred to as 'the DAC') is a Directive (European Union) which sets rules for the Automatic Exchange of Information (AEOI) which apply to members of the European Union (EU).

The DAC's primary purpose is to tackle tax evasion and avoidance through the sharing of information on individuals and entities within the EU.

== Overview ==
The Directive has been amended 7 times to expand the scope of AEOI within the EU, reflecting both global initiatives in this area undertaken by the OECD as well as the EU's own initiatives. In addition, an amendment to the Regulation on administrative cooperation and combating fraud in the field of value added tax adds an additional AEOI reporting requirement in respect of payments.

Amendment	Amending Directive	Information Reported	OECD equivalent measure	Effective from
DAC	Council Directive 2011/16	Employment Income; Capital Gains; Director's Fees; Pensions	-	2012
DAC2	Council Directive 2014/107	Financial accounts	Common Reporting Standard	2014
DAC3	Council Directive 2015/2376	Tax rulings	BEPS Action 5	2012
DAC4	Council Directive 2016/881	Country-by-country tax reporting for multinationals	BEPS Action 13	2016
DAC5	Council Directive 2016/2258	Beneficial ownership of entities	-	2017
DAC6	Council Directive 2018/822	Cross-border arrangements which meet a hallmark of (potential) tax avoidance	BEPS Action 12	2018
DAC7	Council Directive 2021/514	Sellers using digital platforms to: 1. Rent property 2. Rent transportation 3. Sell goods 4. Provide personal services	Digital Platforms Information Reporting (DPI)	2023
DAC8	Council Directive 2023/2226	Transactions involving the buying, selling, exchange or other acquisitions and disposals of cryptocurrency and other digital assets	Crypto-Assets Reporting Framework (CARF)	2026
CESOP	Council Regulation (EU) 2020/283	Cross-border payment transactions where the payer/sender is in the EU, including bank transfers, direct debits, credit and debit card transactions.	-	2024

== History ==
The original Directive (Council Directive 2011/16) entered into force in 2011 and established a framework for co-operation between Member states of the European Union in direct tax matters. The Directive excludes from its scope value-added tax matters, although a separate regulation (Council Regulation No. 904/2010) establishes similar principles.

The first Directive established 2 key principles:

1. Spontaneous Exchange of Information - for tax authorities to inform each other where there may be loss of tax, tax avoidance or profit shifting.
2. Automatic Exchange of Information - for information in the possession of tax authorities related to residents of another EU Member State, such as employment income, director's income or pensions.

=== Common Reporting Standard / DAC2 ===
In 2014, the OECD agreed the principles of Automatic Exchange of Information for financial accounts, under the Common Reporting Standard.

In order to implement these rules with the EU, the DAC was amended by Directive 2014/107 to include the exchange of information on financial accounts. This change required banks, asset managers and certain insurance companies in the EU to gather information on the tax residence of customers and to provide reports to their domestic tax authority every year for onward exchange with other EU Member States.

As a result, an EU resident who holds a bank account, investment account or other investment in another EU country will have details of that account reported to their domestic tax authority. A report by the European Parliament on the implementation of DAC2 indicated that more than 8 million accounts held by EU residents in other countries were reported in 2018.

A 2019 report into the effectiveness of the Common Reporting Standard noted that it was "substantially different from any initiative in the field of information exchange launched so far, including its role model FATCA".

=== Exchange of Information on Tax Rulings / DAC3 ===
In 2015, the Directive was amended (DAC3) to include the mandatory exchange of information on tax rulings granted to residents of other EU Member States. This implemented Action 5 of the OECD's Base Erosion and Profit Shifting (BEPS) project. Unlike subsequent amendments, DAC3 does not impose reporting obligations on companies, as the relevant information is already held by tax authorities.

=== Country-by-country reporting / DAC4 ===
In 2016, the Directive was amended to add the exchange of Country-by-Country Reporting by companies operating in the EU. This gave effect to Action 13 of the OECD's BEPS initiative in the EU.

All multinational companies with revenues greater than €750 million are required to submit reports annually to their tax authority, including groups which are parented outside of the EU but operate in the EU.

In 2021, the EU agreed Directive 2021/2101 which requires public country-by-country reporting to be published by the same companies from 2026 and available on the company's website or on a central register. The requirement under DAC4 remains in place, as more information is required under DAC4 than under the public disclosure rules.

=== Exchange of beneficial ownership information / DAC5 ===
The Directive was amended again in 2016 to provide access to beneficial ownership registers which were established under Anti Money Laundering Directives. In particular, Council Directive 2015/849, the EU's 4th Anti-Money Laundering Directive created a requirement for the registration of information on beneficial ownership in a central register.

=== Mandatory Disclosure Rules / DAC6 ===
In 2018, the Directive was amended to include the exchange of information on "reportable cross-border arrangements." These are transactions involving EU residents that meet one or more "hallmarks" of potential tax avoidance. The Directive defines 15 such hallmarks, including secrecy requirements, the conversion of income into capital, double deductions for expenses, and the cross-border movement of assets or business functions.

Those rules also gave effect to the OECD's Model Mandatory Disclosure Rules for CRS Avoidance Arrangements and Opaque Offshore Structures which require reporting on transactions which seek to avoid reporting under DAC2.

Due to the COVID-19 pandemic, the EU Council subsequently amended the Directive to allow 6-months of additional time for implementation.

=== Digital Platforms Information reporting / DAC7 ===
In 2020, the Directive was amended to include rules which require digital platforms to report information on sellers who use the platform to:

1. Rent property
2. Rent transportation
3. Sell goods
4. Provide personal services

The rules mirror the OECD's Digital Platforms Information package and implement the rules in the EU.

DAC7 has two notable differences from previous amendments to the Directive:

- Extraterritorial scope: The rules apply to digital platforms globally, regardless of where they are based, provided they facilitate activities for sellers resident in the EU. For instance, a US-based platform must report data on its EU-resident users.
- Domestic reporting: Unlike previous amendments focused solely on cross-border activities to support the European single market, DAC7 also mandates reporting on purely domestic transactions (e.g., a French platform reporting on French sellers).

In Germany, DAC7 was transposed into national law through the Plattformen-Steuertransparenzgesetz (PStTG), which entered into force on 1 January 2023. According to a response by the German federal government, platform operators reported 131,386 user records to the Federal Central Tax Office (Bundeszentralamt für Steuern) for the 2023 reporting period, rising to 157,336 records in 2024. A representative survey conducted by the accounting software provider BuchhaltungsButler found that 52.9% of respondents felt uncertain or overwhelmed when assessing their tax obligations related to platform and cryptocurrency income.

=== Crypto-Assets Reporting Framework / DAC8 ===
In 2023, the EU agreed an amendment to the Directive to implement the OECD's Crypto-Assets Reporting Framework for all member states. That adoption was closely tied to the EU's adoption of Markets in Crypto-Assets (MiCA) regulations, with the two regimes intended to work together. These rules require Crypto-Asset Service Providers to report on all transactions which involve the acquisition, disposal or exchange of cryptocurrency and other digital assets.

Like DAC7, the scope of DAC8 is extraterritorial - for example, requiring cryptocurrency exchanges based in the US to report on EU resident customers.

The DAC8 establishes new amendments to the developed set of rules on administrative cooperation in the field of taxation.

The rules are due to go into effect from 1 January 2026.

=== Central Electronic System of Payments (CESOP) ===
In addition to the amendments to the DAC, an additional AEOI reporting requirement was added in 2020 in respect of VAT. This was added through amendments to the VAT Directive and the Regulation on administrative cooperation and combating fraud in the field of value added tax as the DAC only applies to direct tax matters.

Those amendments create a reporting obligation known as CESOP, which requires Payment Service Providers in the EU to report on payments made by EU residents.

== Mechanism for information gathering and exchange ==
With the exception of the original DAC and DAC3, all other amendments to the Directive require information to be provided by private companies to their domestic tax authorities, who then exchange information with EU Member States through the Common Communication Network. In the case of DAC2, DAC3, DAC4, DAC7 and DAC8, EU Member States will also exchange the information collected with non-EU countries operating under the rules established by the OECD's Global Forum on Transparency and Exchange of Information for tax purposes. This also applies to a sub-set of information exchanged under DAC6.

As a result of the DAC, a wide range of companies are required to establish procedures to identify EU residents and report information on their activities to their domestic tax authority. These companies are commonly referred to as 'intermediaries' in the text of the DACs.

=== Intermediaries with obligations under the DAC ===
DAC	In scope intermediaries	Information reported
DAC2	Banks, asset managers, trust companies, wealth managers and other investment vehicles	Balance and income on financial accounts held outside country of residence.
DAC5	Trust companies, company secretaries	Beneficial owners of certain vehicles
DAC6	Lawyers, accountants, tax advisors and other who provide tax advice as an ancillary service	Information on transactions which meet one of 15 hallmarks of tax avoidance
DAC7	Digital platforms who connect buyers and sellers engaged in the sale of goods, rental of accommodation, rental of transport or provision of personal services	Quarterly breakdown of income received from activities, fees paid to the platform and any taxes withheld
DAC8	Cryptocurrency exchanges, fintechs, other digital assets protocols other than fully decentralized finance	Full transaction details on the acquisition and disposal of cryptocurrencies and other digital assets, whether for fiat money or other digital assets.
CESOP	Payment Service Providers under the Payment Services Directive (PSD2)	Full transaction details on cross-border payments at a transaction level, including identifying information for the recipient.

=== Impact on individuals resident in the EU ===
EU residents must provide specific tax information to intermediaries regulated by the DAC. When opening bank or investment accounts, or onboarding as sellers on digital platforms, individuals are typically required to provide:

- Tax residency status;
- Tax Identification Number (TIN).

As of 2026, these requirements also apply to users of cryptocurrency exchanges and other digital asset providers. Additional documentation may be requested in complex cases, such as when an individual's declared tax residency differs from their physical address.

==== Legal Challenges and Privacy ====
The broad scope of the DAC has led to several legal challenges regarding data security and professional ethics:

- Data Privacy: Notable cases include challenges by individuals against the exchange of information under the Common Reporting Standard (DAC2), such as disputes involving the UK's HMRC.
- Legal professional privilege: In 2022, the European Court of Justice ruled that DAC6 requirements forcing law firms to report on certain client activities breached legal professional secrecy obligations.
