= Common Reporting Standard =

2014 OECD data sharing initiative

The Common Reporting Standard (CRS) is an information standard for the Automatic Exchange Of Information (AEOI) regarding financial accounts on a global level, between tax authorities, which the Organisation for Economic Co-operation and Development (OECD) developed in 2014.

Its purpose is to combat tax evasion. The idea was based on the US Foreign Account Tax Compliance Act (FATCA) implementation agreements and its legal basis is the Convention on Mutual Administrative Assistance in Tax Matters (MCAA). 120 countries have signed the agreement to implement, and the MCAA remains open for more countries to adopt. First reporting occurred in 2017, with many of the rest starting in 2018.

== History ==
Until 2014, the parties to most treaties for sharing asset, income and tax information internationally had shared it upon request, which was not effective in preventing tax evasion.

=== 2014 declaration ===
In May 2014, forty-seven countries tentatively agreed on a "common reporting standard", formally referred to as the Standard for Automatic Exchange of Financial Account Information: an agreement to share information on their residents' assets and income automatically in conformation with the standard. Endorsing countries included all 38 OECD countries, as well as Argentina, Brazil, China, Colombia, Costa Rica, India, Indonesia, Malaysia, Saudi Arabia, Singapore, and South Africa.

In September 2014, the G-20 major economies, at their meeting in Cairns, Australia, issued a G20 Common Reporting Standard implementation plan.

The new system was intended to transfer all relevant information automatically and systematically. The agreement has informally been referred to as GATCA (the global version of FATCA)", but "CRS is not just an extension of FATCA".

=== Multilateral Competent Authority Agreement, 2014-present ===
As of October 2014, 51 countries had signed up to the Multilateral Competent Authority Agreement (MCAA), to automatically exchange information based on Article 6 of the Convention on Mutual Administrative Assistance in Tax Matters The agreement specifies the details of what information will be exchanged and when, as set out in the Standard.

As of July 2015, 53 jurisdictions had signed the agreement to automatically exchange information; As of July 2016 83 jurisdictions had signed the agreement.

All European Union (EU) countries, China, India, Hong Kong, Russia and 109 countries altogether have agreed to become signatories. Yet many countries will not participate in the automatic information exchange. Many of those that have not signed are small countries. In April 2016, shortly after the release of the controversial Panama papers, Panama adopted the Multilateral Competent Authorities Agreement (MCAA) and signed the MCAA in Paris in January 2018 joining the CRS MCAA as the 98th jurisdiction. In the United States, a different cross-border tax compliance approach is promoted through the Foreign Account Tax Compliance Act (FATCA). The U.S. receives information relating to US citizens' accounts from many countries due to the compliance requirements of the FATCA. The United States, in many cases, will reciprocate by sharing banking data with countries for accounts which their citizens hold in the U.S., but not automatically, as is required by the U.S. in FATCA.

In 2023, the Common Reporting Standard and the related MCAA became part of the International Standards for Automatic Exchange of Information in Tax Matters. That new agreement primarily reflects the agreement by the OECD of a new exchange of information standard applicable to crypto-assets, the Crypto-Asset Reporting Framework, commonly referred to as CARF. However, the OECD members also agreed a substantial number of changes to the CRS regime itself, designed to improve compliance.

== Information exchanged ==
The information and its exchange format are governed by a detailed standard, whose details are listed in a 44-page long document.

Each participating country will annually automatically exchange with the other country the below information in the case of Jurisdiction A with respect to each Jurisdiction B reportable account, and in the case of Jurisdiction B with respect to each Jurisdiction A reportable account:

1. Name, address, Taxpayer Identification Number (TIN) and date and place of birth of each Reportable Person.
2. Account number
3. Name and identifying number of the reporting financial institution;
4. Account balance or value as of the end of the relevant calendar year (or other appropriate reporting period) or at its closure, if the account was closed.
5. Distributions made to the account (dividends, interest, gross proceeds/redemptions, other)

== Information collection ==
Like FATCA, the Standard requires all financial institutions operating in a country to apply specified due diligence procedures to customers to determine the customers' country or countries of tax residence. Financial institutions typically include all banks and asset managers, as well as certain insurance companies. Those financial institutions then report information to their domestic tax authority annually in advance of 30 September, for onward exchange with other jurisdictions.

The key compliance tool used by the Standard is the 'self-certification' of tax residence, which is required to be completed by all individuals and most entities who open an 'in scope' financial account. Financial accounts are generally in scope where they represent assets of the individual or entity - such as banks accounts, investments in bonds or equities, or investments into collective investment vehicles. Loans, credit cards and other financial products are not in scope for reporting.

As a result, most individuals opening bank accounts in participating countries will be asked for the tax residence and, if they are not resident in the country in which they are opening the account, their Taxpayer Identification Number.

The Standard allows some discretion for each national authority to determine the due diligence approach, but only within minimum standards determined by the OECD: "The term "reportable account" means a [Jurisdiction A] reportable account or a [Jurisdiction B] reportable account, depending on the context, provided it has been identified as such pursuant to due diligence procedures, consistent with the Annex, in place in [Jurisdiction A] or [Jurisdiction B]."

The OECD conducts peer reviews of jurisdictions to ensure compliance with the Standard and requires jurisdictions with deficiencies to correct domestic laws or guidance to bring their approach into line with the OECD's minimum standards.

== Participants ==
Participants in the Common Reporting Standard

The European Union adopted the CRS on 1 January 2016 after amending the Directive on Administrative Cooperation in the field taxation (Directive 2011/16). First reports were submitted by September 2017 and subsequently exchanged between jurisdictions.

As of June 2017, the following countries committed to start reporting in 2017:

Anguilla, Argentina, Barbados, Belgium, Bermuda, British Virgin Islands, Bulgaria, Cayman Islands, Colombia, Croatia, Curaçao, Cyprus, Czech Republic, Denmark, Estonia, Faroe Islands, Finland, France, Germany, Gibraltar, Georgia, Greece, Greenland, Guernsey, Hungary, Iceland, India, Ireland, Isle of Man, Italy, Jersey, South Korea, Latvia, Liechtenstein, Lithuania, Luxembourg, Malta, Mexico, Montserrat, Netherlands, Niue, Norway, Poland, Portugal, Romania, San Marino, Seychelles, Slovak Republic, Slovenia, South Africa, Spain, Sweden, Trinidad and Tobago, Turks and Caicos Islands, United Kingdom

Starting to report in 2018:

Albania, Andorra, Antigua and Barbuda, Aruba, Australia, Austria, The Bahamas, Bahrain, Belize, Brazil, Brunei Darussalam, Canada, Chile, China, Cook Islands, Costa Rica, Dominica, Ghana, Grenada, Hong Kong, Indonesia, Israel, Japan, Kuwait, Lebanon, Marshall Islands, Macau, Malaysia, Mauritius, Monaco, Nauru, New Zealand, Pakistan, Panama, Qatar, Russia, Saint Kitts and Nevis, Samoa, Saint Lucia, Saint Vincent and the Grenadines, Saudi Arabia, Singapore, Sint Maarten, Turkey, Switzerland, United Arab Emirates, Uruguay, Vanuatu

Starting to report in 2024: Ukraine.

The OECD maintains a full list of participants, which includes details of primary legislation, guidance and other relevant information.

=== Non-CRS countries participating in global transparency for tax purposes ===
Of the 154 countries which have signed on the Global Forum on Transparency and Exchange of Information for Tax Purposes, the following countries have not signed on to the CRS:

Incomplete list as of June 2017: Armenia, Azerbaijan, Botswana, Burkina Faso, Cameroon, Chad, Djibouti, Dominican Republic, Ecuador, Egypt, El Salvador, Gabon, Guatemala, Guyana, Ivory Coast, Jamaica, Kenya, Kingdom of Lesotho, Liberia, Maldives, Mauritania, Moldova, Morocco, Niger, Nigeria, Papua New Guinea, Paraguay, Peru, Philippines, North Macedonia, Senegal, Tanzania, Togo, Tunisia, Uganda, United States.

=== Non-participating countries ===
As of June 2019, 59 countries have not signed the CRS Standard: Afghanistan, Algeria, Angola, Bangladesh, Belarus, Benin, Bhutan, Bolivia, Burundi, Cambodia, Central African Republic, Comoros, Congo, Cuba, East Timor, Equatorial Guinea, Eritrea, Eswatini, Ethiopia, Fiji, Gambia, Guinea-Bissau, Honduras, Iran, Iraq, Jordan, Kiribati, Kyrgyzstan, Laos, Libya, Malawi, Mali, Mozambique, Myanmar, Namibia, Nepal, Nicaragua, North Korea, Palau, São Tomé and Príncipe, Sierra Leone, Solomon Islands, Somalia, South Sudan, Sri Lanka, Sudan, Suriname, Syria, Taiwan, China, Tajikistan, Tonga, Turkmenistan, Tuvalu, Uzbekistan, Vatican City State, Venezuela, Vietnam, Yemen, Zambia, Zimbabwe.

== Reactions ==
=== Private sector ===
In 2016, a legal expert complained that "The CRS has a much more ambitious scope, however, and modelling the standard on the FATCA rules has created problems for implementing it in Europe". And a "private sector advocacy group representing financial services and law firms" went even further seeing a "showdown" between the two regimes. In developed countries, the introduction of the CRS has raised professional concerns about the protection of privacy rights for clients of certain legal entities, such as trusts, where protection of sensitive financial information from public disclosure safeguards the beneficiaries against potential financial exploitation and ensures discretion in personal and family matters.

=== Developing countries ===
Transparency groups have reacted in various ways, some of them criticising how developing countries were (not) considered and involved. Collecting and providing information can be so costly and difficult for developing countries obviating participation in the scheme. Instead of offering a period of non-reciprocity, where developing countries could simply receive financial data, the only mention of non-reciprocity agreements is catering to tax havens who do not receive information from other jurisdictions since they would have no use for it (such jurisdictions are still required to provide information under CRS).

=== Loopholes ===
While tax havens will have to provide some information, they can use a number of loopholes (e.g., unequal standards for how information is shared) and also elect not to receive any info in return. The Financial Transparency Coalition criticised the access cost of $73 to download OECD’s report itself, being "a perfect illustration of why this process needs to include low income countries from the start".

The OECD conducts peer reviews to check compliance by each jurisdiction, as well as reviewing compliance to identify risks in compliance and loopholes. It opened a website for whistle-blowers to anonymously report CRS violations including for pensions, insurance, and citizenship-for-sale tools. The OECD has investigated and labeled specifically as "low-risk" an investment tool in Hong Kong called ORS (Occupational Retirement Scheme) which is classified as a "non-reporting financial institutions" and can be used to bypass CRS as it does not need reporting under CRS guidelines and can be used to effectively be like a shell company.

The OECD has also published Model Mandatory Disclosure Rules for CRS Avoidance Arrangements and Opaque Offshore Structures. These rules require intermediaries, like tax advisors, law firms and others to report to their domestic tax authority if they advise on ways to circumvent reporting under the CRS. As of January 2023, 17 jurisdictions have committed to implementing these rules, although all 27 EU Member States and the UK have already implemented these rules as part of an amendment to the Directive on Administrative Co-operation in the field of Taxation (2011/16).

== See also ==
- Exchange of information
- Foreign Account Tax Compliance Act (FATCA)
- Global Forum on Transparency and Exchange of Information for Tax Purposes
- Qualified intermediary
