= Multilateral Convention on Mutual Administrative Assistance in Tax Matters =

Multilateral Convention on Mutual Administrative Assistance in Tax Matters (and amending protocol)
- Original version Original and amended version Amended version Signatories that did not ratify
- Signed: 25 January 1988 (27 May 2010)
- Location: Strasbourg (Paris)
- Effective: 1 April 1995 (1 June 2011)
- Condition: 5 ratifications (5 ratifications)
- Signatories: 132
- Parties: 28 (amended version: 121)
- Depositary: Secretary General of the Council of Europe and the Secretary General of OECD
- Languages: English and French

The Multilateral Convention on Mutual Administrative Assistance in Tax Matters, sometimes abbreviated to MAC, MAAC or MAATM, is a convention to facilitate the entering into bilateral tax information exchange agreements between state parties. The convention was developed by the OECD and the Council of Europe and was open for signature to members of both organizations on 25 January 1988, and entered into force in 1995.

An amending protocol was concluded on 27 May 2010, which since coming into force became open to any state at the invitation of present state parties.

== Ratifications ==
The convention as well as the amending protocol entered into force upon the ratification of five members.

As of January 2025, one state (the United States) is a party to the original convention only, 26 states have ratified the original 1995 convention and the amending protocol, while 70 others are parties to the amended convention. The table below shows between whom the convention applies.

Category	Name	Number of States	Convention applies between other states of category
O	Original Convention	1	O + O&AP
O&AP	Original Convention and Amending Protocol	26	O + O&AP + AC (all states)
AC	Amended Convention	70	O&AP + AC

Country	Ratification (original convention)	Ratification (amending protocol, AP)/ amended convention (AC)	Comments
Albania		8 August 2013 (AC)	
Algeria			Signed the amended convention on 10 October 2024 but has not ratified it.
Andorra		25 August 2016 (AC)	
Antigua and Barbuda		16 October 2018 (AC)	
Argentina		13 September 2012 (AC)	
Armenia		6 February 2020 (AC)	
Austria		28 August 2014 (AC)	
Australia		30 August 2012 (AC)	
Azerbaijan	3 June 2004	29 May 2015 (AP)	
Bahamas		26 April 2018 (AC)	
Bahrain		3 May 2018 (AC)	
Barbados		4 July 2016 (AC)	
Belgium	1 August 2000	8 December 2014 (AP)	
Belize		29 May 2013 (AC)	
Benin		24 January 2023 (AC)	
Bosnia and Herzegovina		21 September 2020 (AC)	
Botswana		15 June 2021 (AC)	
Brazil		1 June 2016 (AC)	
Brunei		28 March 2019 (AC)	
Bulgaria		14 March 2016 (AC)	
Burkina Faso		13 December 2022 (AC)	
Cabo Verde		6 January 2020 (AC)	
Cameroon		30 June 2015 (AC)	
Canada		21 November 2013 (AP)	
Chile		7 July 2016 (AC)	
China		16 October 2015 (AC)	Includes Hong Kong (2018) and Macau (2018)
Colombia		19 March 2014 (AC)	
Costa Rica		5 April 2013 (AC)	
Côte d'Ivoire			Signed the amended convention on 23 April 2025 but has not ratified it.
Croatia		28 February 2014 (AP)	
Cyprus	19 December 2014	19 December 2014 (AP)	
Czech Republic		11 October 2013 (AC)	
Denmark	1 April 1995	28 January 2011 (AP)	Including Faroe Islands (since 2007) and Greenland
Dominica		30 April 2019 (AC)	
Dominican Republic		12 August 2019 (AC)	
Ecuador		26 August 2019 (AC)	
El Salvador		26 February 2019 (AC)	
Estonia		8 July 2014 (AC)	
Eswatini		16 March 2021 (AC)	
Finland	1 April 1995	21 December 2010 (AP)	
France	25 May 2005	13 December 2011 (AP)	
Fiji			Signed the amended convention on 15 January 2026 but has not ratified it.
Gabon			Signed the amended convention on 3 July 2014 but has not ratified it.
Georgia		28 February 2011 (AP)	
Germany	28 August 2015	28 August 2015 (AP)	
Ghana		29 May 2013 (AC)	
Greece	29 May 2013	29 May 2013 (AP)	
Grenada		31 May 2018 (AC)	
Guatemala		9 June 2017 (AC)	
Honduras			Signed the amended convention on 11 July 2022 but has not ratified it.
Hungary	7 November 2014	7 November 2014 (AP)	
Iceland	22 July 1996	28 October 2011 (AP)	
India		21 February 2012 (AC)	
Indonesia		21 January 2015 (AC)	
Ireland		29 May 2013 (AC)	
Israel		31 August 2016 (AC)	
Italy	31 January 2006	17 January 2012 (AP)	
Jamaica		29 November 2018 (AC)	
Japan	28 June 2013	28 June 2013 (AP)	
Jordan		11 August 2021 (AC)	
Kazakhstan		8 April 2014 (AC)	
Kenya		22 July 2020 (AC)	
Kuwait		17 August 2018 (AC)	
Latvia		15 July 2014 (AC)	
Lebanon		12 May 2017 (AC)	
Liberia		26 August 2021 (AC)	
Liechtenstein		22 August 2016 (AC)	
Lithuania	4 February 2014	4 February 2014 (AP)	
Luxembourg	11 July 2014	11 July 2014 (AP)	
Madagascar			Signed the amended convention on 7 July 2022 but has not ratified it.
Malaysia		3 January 2017 (AC)	
Maldives		20 September 2021 (AC)	
Malta		29 May 2013 (AC)	
Marshall Islands		22 December 2016 (AC)	
Mauritania		29 April 2022 (AC)	
Mauritius		31 August 2015 (AC)	
Mexico	23 May 2012	23 May 2012 (AP)	
Moldova	24 November 2011	24 November 2011 (AP)	
Monaco		14 December 2016 (AC)	
Mongolia		19 February 2020 (AC)	
Montenegro		28 January 2020 (AC)	
Morocco		22 May 2019 (AC)	
Namibia		9 December 2020 (AC)	
Nauru		28 June 2016 (AC)	
Kingdom of the Netherlands	15 October 1996	29 May 2013 (AP)	includes Caribbean Netherlands, Aruba, Curacao, and Sint Maarten
New Zealand		21 November 2013 (AC)	includes Cook Islands and Niue.
Nigeria		29 May 2015 (AC)	
North Macedonia		30 September 2019 (AC)	
Norway	13 June 1989	18 February 2011 (AP)	
Oman		7 July 2020 (AC)	
Pakistan		14 December 2016 (AC)	
Panama		16 March 2017 (AC)	
Papua New Guinea		31 August 2023 (AC)	
Paraguay		15 July 2021 (AC)	
Peru		28 May 2018 (AC)	
Philippines		7 January 2025 (AP)	
Poland	25 June 1997	22 June 2011 (AP)	
Portugal		17 November 2014 (AC)	
Qatar		17 September 2018 (AC)	
Romania	11 July 2014	11 July 2014 (AP)	
Russia		4 March 2015 (AC)	
Rwanda		29 August 2022 (AC)	
Saint Kitts and Nevis		25 August 2016 (AC)	
Saint Lucia		21 November 2016 (AC)	
Saint Vincent and the Grenadines		31 August 2016 (AC)	
Samoa		31 August 2016 (AC)	
San Marino		28 August 2015 (AC)	
Saudi Arabia		17 December 2015 (AC)	
Senegal		25 August 2016 (AC)	
Seychelles		25 June 2015 (AC)	
Serbia		30 August 2019 (AC)	
Singapore		20 January 2016 (AC)	
Slovakia		21 November 2013 (AC)	
Slovenia	31 January 2011	31 January 2011 (AP)	
South Africa		21 November 2013 (AC)	
South Korea	26 March 2012	26 March 2012 (AP)	
Spain	10 August 2010	28 September 2012 (AP)	
Sweden	4 July 1990	27 May 2011 (AP)	
Switzerland		26 September 2016 (AC)	
Thailand		22 December 2021 (AC)	
Togo			Signed the amended convention on 30 January 2020 but has not ratified it.
Trinidad and Tobago		3 December 2024 (AC)	
Tunisia		31 October 2013 (AC)	
Turkey		26 March 2018 (AC)	
Uganda		26 May 2016 (AC)	
Ukraine	26 March 2009	22 May 2013 (AP)	
United Arab Emirates		21 May 2018 (AC)	
United Kingdom	24 January 2008	30 June 2011 (AP)	Also extended to Anguilla, Bermuda, British Virgin Islands, Cayman Islands, Gibraltar, Guernsey, Isle of Man, Jersey, Montserrat, and Turks and Caicos Islands
United States	30 January 1991		Including all territories under its jurisdiction; has signed but not ratified the amending protocol
Uruguay		31 August 2016 (AC)	
Vanuatu		28 August 2018 (AC)	
Vietnam		31 August 2023 (AC)	

== See also ==
- Tax information exchange agreements
- International taxation
