= Calcium-responsive transcription factor =

Protein found in humans

CARF

Identifiers
- Aliases: CARF, ALS2CR8, NYD-SP24, calcium responsive transcription factor
- External IDs: OMIM: 607586; MGI: 2182269; GeneCards: CARF

Gene location (Human)
Chr.	Chromosome 2 (human)
Band	2q33.2	Start	202,912,214 bp
Band	2q33.2	End	202,988,263 bp

Gene location (Mouse)
Chr.	Chromosome 1 (mouse)
Band	1|1 C2	Start	60,098,247 bp
Band	1|1 C2	End	60,153,953 bp
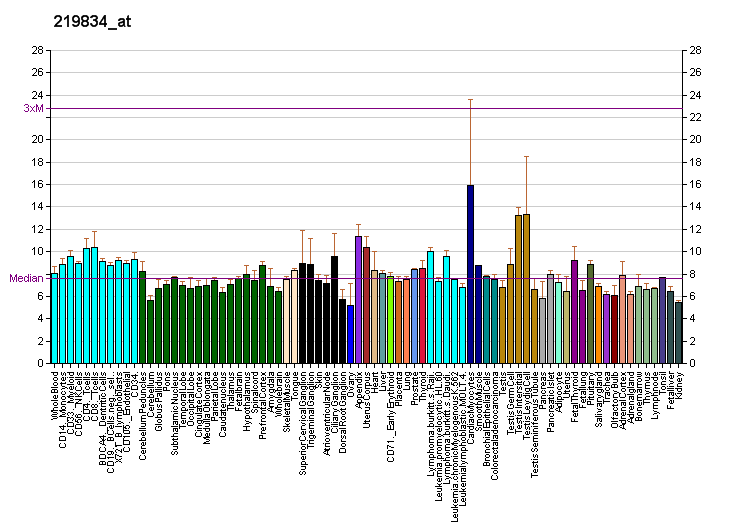
RNA expression pattern
Bgee	Human / Mouse (ortholog); Top expressed in: Achilles tendon; testicle; gonad; ventricular zone; right uterine tube; sural nerve; gallbladder; ganglionic eminence; C1 segment; popliteal artery / Top expressed in: spermatocyte; pineal gland; spermatid; lumbar spinal ganglion; dorsal striatum; seminiferous tubule; medullary collecting duct; superior frontal gyrus; olfactory tubercle; primary visual cortex; More reference expression data
BioGPS	More reference expression data
Gene ontology
Molecular function	DNA-binding transcription factor activity; RNA polymerase II cis-regulatory region sequence-specific DNA binding; DNA binding; DNA-binding transcription activator activity, RNA polymerase II-specific
Cellular component	nucleolus; nucleoplasm; nucleus
Biological process	cellular response to calcium ion; positive regulation of transcription from RNA polymerase II promoter in response to calcium ion; regulation of transcription, DNA-templated; transcription, DNA-templated; cellular response to potassium ion; positive regulation of transcription by RNA polymerase II; transcription by RNA polymerase II
Sources:Amigo / QuickGO
Orthologs
Databases	NCBI: entry; OMA: entry
Species	Human	Mouse
Entrez	79800	241066
Ensembl	ENSG00000138380	ENSMUSG00000026017
UniProt	Q8N187	Q8VHI4
RefSeq (mRNA)	NM_001104586; NM_001282910; NM_001282911; NM_001282912; NM_024744 NM_001322427; NM_001322428; NM_001322429; NM_001322430; NM_001352676; NM_001352677; NM_001352678; NM_001352679	NM_001285463; NM_001285473; NM_139150
RefSeq (protein)	NP_001098056; NP_001269839; NP_001269840; NP_001269841; NP_001309356 NP_001309357; NP_001309358; NP_079020; NP_001339605; NP_001339606; NP_001339607; NP_001339608	NP_001272392; NP_001272402; NP_631889
Location (UCSC)	Chr 2: 202.91 – 202.99 Mb	Chr 1: 60.1 – 60.15 Mb
PubMed search
- Wikidata
View/Edit Human	View/Edit Mouse

Calcium-responsive transcription factor (CaRF) is a protein that in humans is encoded by the CARF gene (formerly ALS2CR8).

Knocking out the Carf (Als2cr8) gene in mice results in learning associated deficits. Furthermore, Carf has been shown to function as a transcription factor that regulates the expression of BDNF.
