= Tax information exchange agreement =

Tax information exchange agreements (TIEA) provide for the exchange of tax-related information.

In 2002, a model TIEA was developed by the OECD Global Forum Working Group on Effective Exchange of Information. Provisions allowing for the exchange of information on request were supplemented by text allowing for the automatic exchange of information on 29 October 2014. The automatic process is based on the Common Reporting Standard.

== Purposes ==
Typically, a TIEA contains the following provisions:

- It provides for exchange of information that is "foreseeably relevant" to the administration and enforcement of domestic tax laws on the Contracting Parties.
- The information provided under a TIEA is protected by confidentiality obligations. Disclosure can be made to courts or judicial forums only for the purpose of determination of the taxation matter in question.
- Information requested may relate to a person who is not a resident of a Contracting Party.
- There is an obligation on the part of the requested Party to gather information if it is not in its possession, notwithstanding that it does not itself need that information. Therefore, no "domestic interest" for tax purposes is required for the provision of information.
- Information is defined in an expansive manner to cover banking details, ownership details of companies/persons/funds/trusts, etc.
- Apart from the exchange of information, representatives of one Party may be permitted to conduct tax examinations in the territory of another party, including interviews of individuals and the examination of records.

== Bilateral agreements (by date of signature) ==
- Denmark – Guatemala (15 May 2012)
- Greenland – Guatemala (15 May 2012)
- Finland – Guatemala (15 May 2012)
- Iceland – Guatemala (15 May 2012)
- Faroe Islands – Guatemala (15 May 2012)
- Norway – Guatemala (15 May 2012)
- Sweden – Guatemala (15 May 2012)
- Denmark – Uruguay (14 December 2011)
- Faroe Islands – Uruguay (14 December 2011)
- Greenland – Uruguay (14 December 2011)
- Iceland – Uruguay (14 December 2011)
- Norway – Uruguay (14 December 2011)
- Sweden – Uruguay (14 December 2011)
- Iceland – Mauritius (1 December 2011)
- Denmark – Mauritius (1 December 2011)
- Faroe Islands – Mauritius (1 December 2011)
- Finland – Mauritius (1 December 2011)
- Greenland – Mauritius (1 December 2011)
- Norway – Mauritius (1 December 2011)
- Czech Republic – San Marino (25 November 2011)
- Greenland – Barbados (3 November 2011)
- Denmark – Barbados (3 November 2011)
- Faroe Islands – Barbados (3 November 2011)
- Faroe Islands – Bahrain (14 October 2011)
- Denmark – Bahrain (14 October 2011)
- Finland – Bahrain (14 October 2011)
- Greenland – Bahrain (14 October 2011)
- Iceland – Bahrain (14 October 2011)
- Norway – Bahrain (14 October 2011)
- Sweden – Bahrain (14 October 2011)
- The Bahamas – South Africa (14 September 2011)
- Bermuda – South Africa (6 September 2011)
- Bermuda – Argentina (22 August 2011)
- Czech Republic – Bermuda (15 August 2011)
- Australia – Liberia (11 August 2011)
- Aruba – The Bahamas (8 August 2011)
- The Bahamas – Guernsey (8 August 2011)
- Czech Republic – Isle of Man (18 July 2011)
- Australia – Macao (12 July 2011)
- Czech Republic – Jersey (12 July 2011)
- Australia – Costa Rica (1 July 2011)
- Sweden – Costa Rica (29 June 2011)
- Norway – Costa Rica (29 June 2011)
- Denmark – Costa Rica (29 June 2011)
- Finland – Costa Rica (29 June 2011)
- Iceland – Costa Rica (29 June 2011)
- Faroe Islands – Costa Rica (29 June 2011)
- Greenland – Costa Rica (29 June 2011)
- Slovenia – Isle of Man (27 June 2011)
- Bermuda – Indonesia (22 June 2011)
- Isle of Man – Indonesia (22 June 2011)
- Japan – Isle of Man (21 June 2011)
- Australia – Liechtenstein (21 June 2011)
- Czech Republic – British Virgin Islands (13 June 2011)
- Ireland – Vanuatu (31 May 2011)
- Grenada – Vanuatu (31 May 2011)
- San Marino – Vanuatu (19 May 2011)
- Denmark – Macau (29 April 2011)
- Faroe Islands – Macau (29 April 2011)
- Finland – Macau (29 April 2011)
- Greenland – Macau (29 April 2011)
- Iceland – Macau (29 April 2011)
- Norway – Macau (29 April 2011)
- Sweden – Macau (29 April 2011)
- Greenland – The Seychelles (30 March 2011)
- Faroe Islands – The Seychelles (30 March 2011)
- Iceland – The Seychelles (30 March 2011)
- Finland – The Seychelles (30 March 2011)
- Denmark – The Seychelles (30 March 2011)
- Norway – The Seychelles (30 March 2011)
- Sweden – The Seychelles (30 March 2011)
- Ghana – Liberia (24 February 2011)
- India – The Bahamas (11 February 2011)
- Japan – The Bahamas (27 January 2011)
- Sweden – Liechtenstein (29 December 2010)
- Denmark – Liechtenstein (29 December 2010)
- Faroe Islands – Liechtenstein (29 December 2010)
- Greenland – Liechtenstein (29 December 2010)
- Iceland – Liechtenstein (29 December 2010)
- Finland – Liechtenstein (29 December 2010)
- Norway – Liechtenstein (29 December 2010)
- Argentina – People's Republic of China (13 December 2010)
- Australia – Mauritius (8 December 2010)
- Bermuda – People's Republic of China (3 December 2010)
- United States – Panama (30 November 2010)
- Australia – Montserrat (23 November 2010)
- Aruba – St. Kitts and Nevis (23 November 2010)
- France – Belize (22 November 2010)
- Finland – Montserrat (22 November 2010)
- Norway – Montserrat (22 November 2010)
- Denmark – Montserrat (22 November 2010)
- Greenland – Montserrat (22 November 2010)
- Iceland – Montserrat (22 November 2010)
- Sweden – Montserrat (22 November 2010)
- Faroe Islands – Montserrat (22 November 2010)
- Mexico – Cook Islands (22 November 2010)
- Ireland – Belize (18 November 2010)
- Denmark – Liberia (10 November 2010)
- Sweden – Liberia (10 November 2010)
- Norway – Liberia (10 November 2010)
- Faroe Islands – Liberia (10 November 2010)
- Greenland – Liberia (10 November 2010)
- Iceland – Liberia (10 November 2010)
- Finland – Liberia (10 November 2010)
- United Kingdom – Aruba (5 November 2010)
- United Kingdom – Liberia (1 November 2010)
- Canada – San Marino (27 October 2010)
- Portugal – Belize (22 October 2010)
- Greenland – Vanuatu (13 October 2010)
- Sweden – Vanuatu (13 October 2010)
- Norway – Vanuatu (13 October 2010)
- Iceland – Vanuatu (13 October 2010)
- Finland – Vanuatu (13 October 2010)
- Faroe Islands – Vanuatu (13 October 2010)
- Denmark – Vanuatu (13 October 2010)
- India – Bermuda (7 October 2010)
- Germany – British Virgin Islands (5 October 2010)
- Portugal – British Virgin Islands (5 October 2010)
- Portugal – Dominica (5 October 2010)
- Ireland – Marshall Islands (4 October 2010)
- Guernsey – San Marino (29 September 2010)
- Norway – Marshall Islands (28 September 2010)
- Iceland – Marshall Islands (28 September 2010)
- Greenland – Marshall Islands (28 September 2010)
- Finland – Marshall Islands (28 September 2010)
- Faroe Islands – Marshall Islands (28 September 2010)
- Sweden – Marshall Islands (28 September 2010)
- Denmark – Marshall Islands (28 September 2010)
- Germany – Dominica (21 September 2010)
- Finland – Belize (15 September 2010)
- Norway – Belize (15 September 2010)
- Iceland – Belize (15 September 2010)
- Denmark – Belize (15 September 2010)
- Greenland – Belize (15 September 2010)
- Faroe Islands – Belize (15 September 2010)
- Sweden – Belize (15 September 2010)
- France – Cook Islands (15 September 2010)
- Portugal – Antigua & Barbuda (13 September 2010)
- United Kingdom – Netherlands Antilles (10 September 2010)
- Spain – San Marino (6 September 2010)
- Antigua and Barbuda – Aruba (1 September 2010)
- Mexico – Cayman Islands (28 August 2010)
- New Zealand – Samoa (24 August 2010)
- New Zealand – Marshall Islands (4 August 2010)
- New Zealand – Vanuatu (4 August 2010)
- Portugal – St. Kitts and Nevis (29 July 2010)
- Germany – Monaco (27 July 2010)
- Portugal – St. Lucia (14 July 2010)
- Portugal – Jersey (9 July 2010)
- Portugal – Isle of Man (9 July 2010)
- Portugal – Guernsey (9 July 2010)
- Canada – Dominica (29 June 2010)
- Canada – Cayman Islands (24 June 2010)
- Sweden – Monaco (23 June 2010)
- Iceland – Monaco (23 June 2010)
- Norway – Monaco (23 June 2010)
- Finland – Monaco (23 June 2010)
- Denmark – Monaco (23 June 2010)
- Greenland – Monaco (23 June 2010)
- Faroe – Monaco (23 June 2010)
- Canada – Saint-Lucia (18 June 2010)
- Canada – The Bahamas (17 June 2010)
- Canada – Bermuda (14 June 2010)
- Canada – St. Kitts and Nevis (14 June 2010)
- Germany – Saint Lucia (7 June 2010)
- Germany – Turks and Caicos Islands (4 June 2010)
- Germany – Cayman Islands (27 May 2010)
- Netherlands – Liberia (27 May 2010)
- Norway – Antigua and Barbuda (19 May 2010)
- Norway – Dominica (19 May 2010)
- Norway – Grenada (19 May 2010)
- Norway – Saint Lucia (19 May 2010)
- Groenland – Antigua and Barbuda (19 May 2010)
- Groenland – Dominica (19 May 2010)
- Groenland – Grenada (19 May 2010)
- Groenland – Saint Lucia (19 May 2010)
- Sweden – Grenada (19 May 2010)
- Sweden – Dominica (19 May 2010)
- Sweden – Saint Lucia (19 May 2010)
- Sweden – Antigua and Barbuda (19 May 2010)
- Iceland – Grenada (19 May 2010)
- Iceland – Dominica (19 May 2010)
- Iceland – Saint Lucia (19 May 2010)
- Iceland – Antigua and Barbuda (19 May 2010)
- Finland – Antigua and Barbuda (19 May 2010)
- Finland – Dominica (19 May 2010)
- Finland – Grenada (19 May 2010)
- Finland – Saint Lucia (19 May 2010)
- Faroe Islands – Grenada (19 May 2010)
- Faroe Islands – Saint Lucia (19 May 2010)
- Faroe Islands – Dominica (19 May 2010)
- Faroe Islands – Antigua and Barbuda (19 May 2010)
- Denmark – Grenada (19 May 2010)
- Denmark – Dominica (19 May 2010)
- Portugal – Cayman Islands (13 May 2010)
- Australia – Marshall Islands (12 May 2010)
- Aruba – Saint-Lucia (10 May 2010)
- Portugal – Bermuda (10 May 2010)
- Netherlands – Gibraltar (23 April 2010)
- Australia – Vanuatu (21 April 2010)
- Aruba – Cayman Islands (20 April 2010)
- France – St. Vincent and the Grenadines (13 April 2010)
- Germany – Bahamas (9 April 2010)
- Australia – Monaco (1 April 2010)
- France – St. Kitts and Nevis (1 April 2010)
- France – Saint Lucia (1 April 2010)
- Australia – Dominica (31 March 2010)
- Australia – Belize (31 March 2010)
- United Kingdom – Grenada (31 March 2010)
- United Kingdom – Dominica (31 March 2010)
- France – Grenada (31 March 2010)
- Australia – Turks and the Caicos (30 March 2010)
- Australia – Grenada (30 March 2010)
- Australia – Saint Lucia (30 March 2010)
- Australia – Cayman Islands (30 March 2010)
- Australia – Bahamas (30 March 2010)
- Germany – St. Vincent and the Grenadines (29 March 2010)
- France – Antigua and Barbuda (26 March 2010)
- United Kingdom – Belize (25 March 2010)
- Finland – St. Vincent and the Grenadines (24 March 2010)
- Iceland – St. Vincent and the Grenadines (24 March 2010)
- Sweden – St. Vincent and the Grenadines (24 March 2010)
- Faroe – St. Vincent and the Grenadines (24 March 2010)
- Norway – St. Vincent and the Grenadines (24 March 2010)
- Greenland – St. Vincent and the Grenadines (24 March 2010)
- Iceland – St Kitts and Nevis (24 March 2010)
- Sweden – St Kitts and Nevis (24 March 2010)
- Faroe – St Kitts and Nevis (24 March 2010)
- Norway – St Kitts and Nevis (24 March 2010)
- Greenland – St Kitts and Nevis (24 March 2010)
- Finland – St Kitts and Nevis (24 March 2010)
- Australia – Anguilla (20 March 2010)
- Germany – Anguilla (19 March 2010)
- Australia – St Vincent and the Grenadines (18 March 2010)
- Belgium – Grenada (18 March 2010)
- New Zealand – Dominica (16 March 2010)
- New Zealand – St. Vincent and the Grenadines (16 March 2010)
- Spain – Bahamas (11 March 2010)
- Finland – Bahamas (10 March 2010)
- Iceland – Bahamas (10 March 2010)
- Norway – Bahamas (10 March 2010)
- Sweden – Bahamas (10 March 2010)
- Greenland – Bahamas (10 March 2010)
- The Faroe Islands (10 March 2010)
- Denmark – Bahamas (10 March 2010)
- Australia – Saint Kitts and Nevis (5 March 2010)
- Australia – San Marino (4 March 2010)
- Belgium – Dominica (26 February 2010)
- Sweden – Andorra (24 February 2010)
- Iceland – Andorra (24 February 2010)
- Greenland – Andorra (24 February 2010)
- Norway – Andorra (24 February 2010)
- Faroe Islands – Andorra (24 February 2010)
- Finland – Andorra (24 February 2010)
- Denmark – Andorra (24 February 2010)
- Mexico – The Bahamas (23 February 2010)
- Netherlands – Grenada (18 February 2010)
- United Kingdom – San Marino (16 February 2010)
- Belgium – Montserrat (16 February 2010)
- Netherlands – Belize (4 February 2010)
- Japan – Bermuda (1 February 2010)
- France – Uruguay (28 January 2010)
- Netherlands – San Marino (27 January 2010)
- United Kingdom – St Kitts & Nevis (18 January 2010)
- United Kingdom – Saint Lucia (18 January 2010)
- United Kingdom – St. Vincent and the Grenadines (18 January 2010)
- United Kingdom – Antigua & Barbuda (18 January 2010)
- Spain – Andorra (14 January 2010)
- Finland – San Marino (12 January 2010)
- Norway – San Marino (12 January 2010)
- Sweden – San Marino (12 January 2010)
- Iceland – San Marino (12 January 2010)
- Denmark – San Marino (12 January 2010)
- Netherlands – Monaco (11 January 2010)
- France – Vanuatu (31 December 2009)
- Belgium – Belize (29 December 2009)
- Ireland – Saint Lucia (22 December 2009)
- Belgium – Saint-Kitts and Nevis (18 December 2009)
- Belgium – Gibraltar (16 December 2009)
- Australia – Samoa (16 December 2009)
- Australia – Aruba (16 December 2009)
- Denmark – Cook Islands (16 December 2009)
- Denmark – Samoa (16 December 2009)
- Faroe Islands – Cook Islands (16 December 2009)
- Faroe Islands – Samoa (16 December 2009)
- Faroe Islands – Turks & Caicos (16 December 2009)
- Finland – Cook Islands (16 December 2009)
- Finland – Samoa (16 December 2009)
- Finland – Turks & Caicos (16 December 2009)
- Greenland – Cook Islands (16 December 2009)
- Greenland – Samoa (16 December 2009)
- Greenland – Turks & Caicos (16 December 2009)
- Iceland – Cook Islands (16 December 2009)
- Iceland – Gibraltar (16 December 2009)
- Iceland – Samoa (16 December 2009)
- Iceland – Turks & Caicos (16 December 2009)
- Norway – Cook Islands (16 December 2009)
- Norway – Gibraltar (16 December 2009)
- Norway – Samoa (16 December 2009)
- Norway – Turks & Caicos (16 December 2009)
- Sweden – Cook Islands (16 December 2009)
- Sweden – Gibraltar (16 December 2009)
- Sweden – Samoa (16 December 2009)
- Sweden – Turks & Caicos (16 December 2009)
- Ireland – Antigua & Barbuda (15 December 2009)
- Ireland – St Vincent & Grenadines (15 December 2009)
- Faroe Islands – Anguilla (14 December 2009)
- Finland – Anguilla (14 December 2009)
- Greenland – Anguilla (14 December 2009)
- Iceland – Anguilla (14 December 2009)
- Norway – Anguilla (14 December 2009)
- Sweden – Anguilla (14 December 2009)
- New Zealand – Turks & Caicos (11 December 2009)
- New Zealand – Anguilla (11 December 2009)
- Liechtenstein – St Kitts & Nevis (11 December 2009)
- Denmark – Saint Lucia (10 December 2009)
- Netherlands – Montserrat (8 December 2009)
- Ireland – Cook Islands (8 December 2009)
- Ireland – Samoa (8 December 2009)
- Argentina – San Marino (7 December 2009)
- Belgium – St Lucia (7 December 2009)
- Belgium – St Vincent & the Grenadines (7 December 2009)
- Belgium – Antigua & Barbuda (7 December 2009)
- Bahamas – France (7 December 2009)
- Ireland – British Virgin Islands (7 December 2009)
- Bahamas – Belgium (7 December 2009)
- Bahamas – Netherlands (4 December 2009)
- Bahamas – Argentina (3 December 2009)
- St. Lucia – The Netherlands (2 December 2009)
- Bahamas – China (1 December 2009)
- Portugal – Andorra (30 November 2009)
- New Zealand – Saint Kitts and Nevis (24 November 2009)
- Liechtenstein – Antigua & Barbuda (24 November 2009)
- Argentina – Costa Rica (23 November 2009)
- New Zealand – Bahamas (18 November 2009)
- Belgium – Liechtenstein (10 November 2009)
- Netherlands – Liechtenstein (10 November 2009)
- Andorra – Netherlands (6 November 2009)
- Antigua and Barbuda – Netherlands Antilles (29 October 2009)
- St. Lucia – Netherlands Antilles (29 October 2009)
- Netherlands Antilles – Cayman Islands (29 October 2009)
- United Kingdom – Bahamas (29 October 2009)
- Australia – Cook Islands (27 October 2009)
- Argentina – Andorra (26 October 2009)
- Netherlands – Cook Islands (23 October 2009)
- Belgium – Andorra (23 October 2009)
- Aruba – Bermuda (20 October 2009)
- Faroe Islands – Gibraltar (20 October 2009)
- Finland – Gibraltar (20 October 2009)
- Greenland – Gibraltar (20 October 2009)
- Mexico – Bermuda (15 October 2009)
- Portugal – Gibraltar (14 October 2009)
- Ireland – Liechtenstein (13 October 2009)
- Argentina – Monaco (13 October 2009)
- France – Bermuda (8 October 2009)
- Australia – Guernsey (7 October 2009)
- France – Cayman Islands (5 October 2009)
- Liechtenstein – St Vincent & the Grenadines (2 October 2009)
- The Bahamas (28 Sept 2009)
- The Bahamas – San Marino (24 September 2009)
- France – Turks and Caicos (24 September 2009)
- France – San Marino (22 September 2009)
- France – Liechtenstein (22 September 2009)
- France – Gibraltar (22 September 2009)
- France – Andorra (22 September 2009)
- Greenland – San Marino (22 September 2009)
- Monaco – Liechtenstein (21 September 2009)
- Monaco – Andorra (18 September 2009)
- Monaco – Bahamas (18 September 2009)
- Andorra – San Marino (21 September 2009)
- Andorra – Liechtenstein (18 September 2009)
- Austria – Gibraltar (17 September 2009)
- Austria – Andorra (17 September 2009)
- Austria – Monaco (17 September 2009)
- Austria – St Vincent & the Grendines (14 September 2009)
- Netherlands – Samoa (14 September 2009)
- Netherlands – British Virgin Islands (11 September 2009)
- Aruba – British Virgin Islands (11 September 2009)
- Netherlands Antilles – British Virgin Islands (11 September 2009)
- Netherlands Antilles – St Kitts & Nevis (11 September 2009)
- Aruba – St Kitts & Nevis (11 September 2009)
- Denmark – Aruba (10 September 2009)
- The Faroe Islands – Aruba (10 September 2009)
- Finland – Aruba (10 September 2009)
- Greenland – Aruba (10 September 2009)
- Iceland – Aruba (10 September 2009)
- Norway – Aruba (10 September 2009)
- Sweden – Aruba (10 September 2009)
- Denmark – Netherlands Antilles (10 September 2009)
- The Faroe Islands – Netherlands Antilles (10 September 2009)
- Finland – Netherlands Antilles (10 September 2009)
- Greenland – Netherlands Antilles (10 September 2009)
- Iceland – Netherlands Antilles (10 September 2009)
- Sweden – Netherlands Antilles (10 September 2009)
- The Faroe Islands – San Marino (10 September 2009)
- United States – Monaco (8 September 2009)
- Denmark – Turks & Caicos Islands (7 September 2009)
- Monaco – Samoa (7 September 2009)
- Netherlands – Antigua & Barbuda (2 September 2009)
- Denmark – Antigua (2 September 2009)
- Denmark – Gibraltar (2 September 2009)
- Denmark – Anguilla (2 September 2009)
- Germany – Liechtenstein (2 September 2009)
- Netherlands – St Vincent & the Grenadines (1 September 2009)
- Denmark – St Vincent & Grenadines (1 September 2009)
- Denmark – St Kitts & Nevis (1 September 2009)
- Netherlands – St Kitts & Nevis (1 September 2009)
- Mexico – Netherlands Antilles (1 September 2009)
- San Marino – Samoa (1 September 2009)
- Aruba – St. Vincent and the Grenadines (1 September 2009)
- Canada – Netherlands Antilles (29 August 2009)
- United Kingdom/Gibraltar (27 August 2009)
- Australia/Gibraltar (25 August 2009)
- New Zealand – British Virgin Islands (14 August 2009)
- New Zealand – Cayman Islands (14 August 2009)
- New Zealand – Gibraltar (13 August 2009)
- Germany – Gibraltar (13 August 2009)
- Liechtenstein – UK (11 August 2009)
- Monaco – San Marino (29 July 2009)
- Bermuda – Ireland (28 July 2009)
- New Zealand – Isle of Man (27 July 2009)
- New Zealand – Jersey (27 July 2009)
- United Kingdom – Turks & Caicos (23 July 2009)
- Netherlands – Turks & Caicos (22 July 2009)
- Netherlands – Anguilla (22 July 2009)
- Ireland – Turks & Caicos (22 July 2009)
- Ireland – Anguilla (22 July 2009)
- New Zealand – Guernsey (21 July 2009)
- UK – Anguilla (20 July 2009)
- Belgium – Monaco (15 July 2009)
- New Zealand – Cook Islands (9 July 2009)
- The Netherlands – The Cayman Islands (8 July 2009)
- Germany – Bermuda (3 July 2009)
- Ireland – Gibraltar (24 June 2009)
- Ireland – Cayman Islands (23 June 2009)
- France – British Virgin Islands (17 June 09)
- Australia – Jersey (10 June 2009)
- The Netherlands – Bermuda (8 June 2009)
- Denmark – British Virgin Islands (19 May 2009)
- Faroes – British Virgin Islands (19 May 2009)
- Finland – British Virgin Islands (19 May 2009)
- Greenland – British Virgin Islands (19 May 2009)
- Iceland – British Virgin Islands (19 May 2009)
- Norway – British Virgin Islands (19 May 2009)
- Sweden – British Virgin Islands (19 May 2009)
- New Zealand – Bermuda (17 April 2009)
- Denmark – Bermuda Denmark – Cayman Islands (16 April 2009)
- Faroes – Bermuda Faroes – Cayman Islands (16 April 2009)
- Finland – Bermuda Finland – Cayman Islands (16 April 2009)
- Greenland – Bermuda Greenland – Cayman Islands (16 April 2009)
- Iceland – Bermuda Iceland – Cayman Islands (16 April 2009)
- Norway – Bermuda Norway – Cayman Islands (16 April 2009)
- Sweden – Bermuda Sweden – Cayman Islands (16 April 2009)
- Denmark – Cayman Islands (1 April 2009)
- Faroes – Cayman Islands (1 April 2009)
- Finland – Cayman Islands (1 April 2009)
- Greenland – Cayman Islands (1 April 2009)
- Iceland – Cayman Islands (1 April 2009)
- Norway – Cayman Islands (1 April 2009)
- Sweden – Cayman Islands (1 April 2009)
- USA – Gibraltar (31 March 2009)
- France – Isle of Man (26 March 2009)
- Ireland – Jersey (26 March 2009)
- Ireland – Guernsey (26 March 2009)
- Germany – Guernsey (26 March 2009)
- France – Guernsey (24 March 2009)
- France – Jersey (23 March 2009)
- The United Kingdom – Jersey (10 March 2009)
- Germany – Isle of Man (2 March 2009)
- Australia – Isle of Man (29 January 2009)
- The United Kingdom – Guernsey (20 January 2009)
- The United States – Liechtenstein (8 December 2008)
- Portugal – Andorra (30 November 2008)
- Spain – Aruba (24 November 2008)
- United Kingdom – British Virgin Islands (29 October 2008)
- Denmark – Guernsey (28 October 2008)
- Denmark – Jersey (28 October 2008)
- Faroes – Guernsey (28 October 2008)
- Faroes – Jersey (28 October 2008)
- Finland – Guernsey (28 October 2008)
- Finland – Jersey (28 October 2008)
- Greenland – Guernsey (28 October 2008)
- Greenland – Jersey (28 October 2008)
- Iceland – Guernsey (28 October 2008)
- Iceland – Jersey (28 October 2008)
- Norway – Guernsey (28 October 2008)
- Norway – Jersey (28 October 2008)
- Sweden – Guernsey (28 October 2008)
- Sweden – Jersey (28 October 2008)
- Australia – British Virgin Islands (27 October 2008)
- Isle of Man – United Kingdom (29 September 2008)
- Jersey – Germany (4 July 2008)
- Netherlands Antilles – Spain (10 June 2008)
- Guernsey – Netherlands (25 April 2008)
- Isle of Man – Ireland (24 April 2008)
- Bermuda – United Kingdom (4 December 2007)
- Denmark – Isle of Man (30 October 2007)
- Faroes – Isle of Man (30 October 2007)
- Finland – Isle of Man (30 October 2007)
- Greenland – Isle of Man (30 October 2007)
- Iceland – Isle of Man (30 October 2007)
- Isle of Man – Norway (30 October 2007)
- Isle of Man – Sweden (30 October 2007)
- Jersey – Netherlands (20 June 2007)
- Netherlands Antilles – New Zealand (1 March 2007)
- Australia – Netherlands Antilles (1 March 2007)
- Antigua & Barbuda – Australia (30 January 2007)
- Australia – Bermuda (10 November 2005)
- Isle of Man – Kingdom of The Netherlands (12 October 2005)
- Aruba – United States (21 November 2003)
- Jersey – United States (4 November 2002)
- Isle of Man – United States (2 October 2002)
- Guernsey – United States (19 September 2002)
- Netherlands Antilles – United States (17 April 2002)
- British Virgin Islands – United States (3 April 2002)
- Bahamas – United States (25 January 2002)
- Cayman Islands – United States (27 November 2001)
- Antigua & Barbuda – United States (6 December 2000)

== See also ==
- International taxation
- Double taxation
- Tax equalization
- Tax evasion
- Tax haven
- OECD
- Global Forum on Transparency and Exchange of Information for Tax Purposes
- Financial Action Task Force
