= Country-by-Country Reporting =

Initiative against tax avoidance

Country-by-Country Reporting (CbCR, with the related report pertaining to a particular entity referred to as a Country-by-Country report or CbC report) is an international initiative pioneered by the OECD. It establishes a reporting standard for multinational enterprises (MNEs) with total consolidated group revenues > EUR 750 million containing key tax-related information including financial information and information on employees and non-cash tangible assets. Under the OECD rules, the information is to be exchanged between the tax authorities of the exchanging countries. However, the EU adopted legislation to make Country-by-Country reports publicly available after 2024.

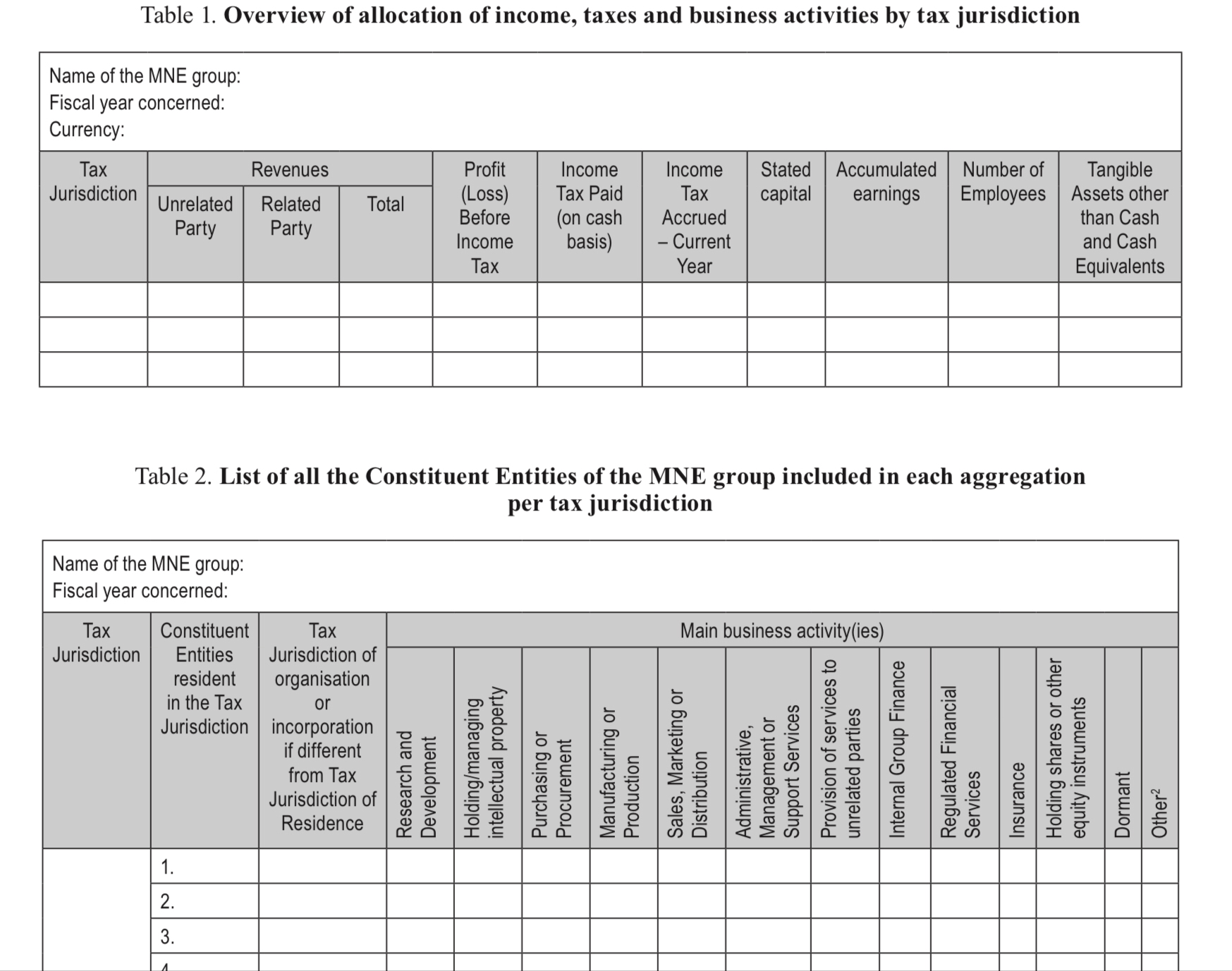
CbCR reporting requirements

== History ==
Country-by-Country Reporting was initially proposed in 2003 as an accounting standard. The proposal emanated originally from the Tax Justice Network. The key component was information that would allow reconciliation of financial statements across different national jurisdictions. The initiative was initially considered as utopian and remained unsuccessful, until the Base erosion and profit shifting (OECD project) took it over in the context of combatting tax avoidance. In 2015, Country-by-Country Reporting was formally adopted in Action 13 of OECD's final report on Base erosion and profit shifting (OECD project). Under Article 13 of the report, MNEs are required to provide information in a standardized format on their international income and tax allocation to national tax authorities.

The OECD initiative led to a growing number of national and internationals proposals built around Country-by-Country Reporting requirements.

== Public Country-by-Country Reporting ==
Country-by-Country reports are exchanged between tax administrations and are generally not released to the wider public. Campaigners and commentators have called for public disclosure of the information in the reports to allow investors to make more informed decisions. The U.S. Securities and Exchange Commission would be in a position to require such disclosure from listed companies.

In 2016, the United Kingdom decided to make Country-by-Country reports public; however, this decision was reversed in 2020 by Rishi Sunak.

In 2021, the EU adopted new legislation which requires companies to publicly disclose Country-by-Country reports. Most EU Member States supported the initiative. Large companies, including non-European multinationals, will have to comply with disclosure from 2025, depending on their country of residence. The first EU pCbCR compliant reports began to first emerge in Romania in early 2025: with implementation ranging from full to partial compliance. This was followed by pCbCR filings in Croatia and Spain, with widescale application of the Directive anticipated across the whole of Europe in 2026.

== Reception and shortcomings ==
Country-by-Country Reporting is expected to challenge the administrative capacity of the finance departments of companies subjected to the disclosure requirements.

According to commentators, Country-by-Country Reporting fails to effectively address tax avoidance, especially as the OECD rules do not require the reports to be made public. The responsibility remains with individual countries to require the public disclosure of information regarding the subject MNEs' tax structuring. Commentators have also pointed to shortcomings in the EU legislation. The scope of public reporting on national profits was reduced from the initial proposal to only include European countries and certain jurisdictions considered as tax havens, the list of which seems incomplete, as for example Bermuda is excluded. Oxfam expressed concerns in respect of the companies to which the disclosure requirements apply, as only the largest MNEs would fall under the public Country-by-Country Reporting rules.

== See also ==
- Base erosion and profit shifting (OECD project)
- Double Irish arrangement
- Ireland v Commission
