= Julie E. Cohen =

American legal scholar

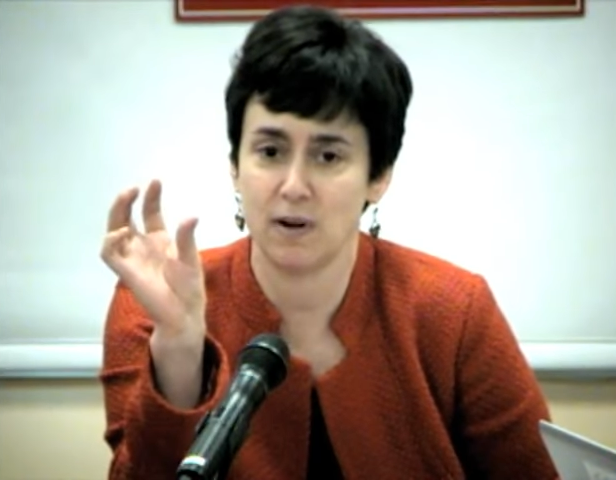
Cohen speaking around 2010

Julie E. Cohen is an American legal scholar. Since 1999, she has been a professor of law at Georgetown University Law Center, teaching and writing about copyright, intellectual property, and privacy. She is also currently a member of the advisory board for public interest organizations Electronic Privacy Information Center and Public Knowledge. Along with academic articles, Cohen is the author of Configuring the Networked Self: Law, Code, and the Play of Everyday Practice and a co-author of casebook Copyright in a Global Information Economy.

== Education and early career ==
After receiving her A.B. from Harvard University and her J.D. from Harvard Law School, Cohen went on to be law clerk for Judge Stephen Reinhardt of the United States Court of Appeals for the Ninth Circuit. From 1992 to 1995, she practiced with the San Francisco firm of McCutchen, Doyle, Brown & Enersen, specializing in intellectual property litigation. In 1995, she joined the University of Pittsburgh School of Law as the assistant professor of law.

== Academic writing ==
=== Intellectual property ===
Cohen has been an important participant in the discussion surrounding intellectual property and copyright. There has been an ongoing debate about the use of technology instead of, or in addition to, copyright to protect intellectual property in digital form. She has expressed concern about the potential legal impact of these technologies, as well as mass market contracts as they threaten individual privacy and autonomy.

=== Subjectivity and the self ===
Cohen uses a philosophical approach to legal theory. She questions and analyzes legal theory's conception of the self, and argues that the assumptions that contemporary legal policy often makes about the self "subtly structure debates about information policy." Cohen introduces postmodernist conceptions of the self into discussions of information policy.
