= Tax information reporting =

Tax information reporting in the United States is a requirement for organizations to report wage and non-wage payments made in the course of their trade or business to the Internal Revenue Service (IRS). This area of government reporting and corporate responsibility is continuously growing, carrying with it a large number of regulatory requirements established by the federal government and the states. There are currently more than 30 types of tax information returns required by the federal government, and they provide the primary cross-checking measure the IRS has to verify accuracy of tax returns filed by individual taxpayers.

== Information returns ==
The most familiar tax information return is Form W-2, which reports "wages and compensation paid to employees." There are also many forms used to report non-wage income, and to report transactions that may entitle a taxpayer to take a credit on an individual tax return. These non-wage forms are the Forms 1099 (16 types), 1098 (4 types), and 5498 (3 types).

Each form covers different payments or transactions, some for multiple types. Each has unique rules about when, what, and how much to report, making compliance complex. Due to this complexity, many filers rely on third-party reporting software.

Form 1099-INT reports interest paid on deposits at financial institutions (and some other types of business interest as well). Form 1099-S reports income from the sale of real estate. Form 1099-R reports payments from pensions, annuities, retirement and profit-sharing plans, IRA accounts, and some forms of insurance. Forms 1099-DIV, 1099-B and 1099-OID report various investment income and transactions. Form 1099-MISC reports a variety of payments including rent, crop insurance proceeds, so-called "golden parachute" payments, royalties, payments for medical treatment, income from fish that are sold for cash, and payments for business services.

Form 1098 reports interest on a mortgage; Form 1098-T reports tuition and other educational expenses; Form 1098-E reports interest on student loans; Form 1098-C reports the value of a vehicle that has been donated to a charitable organization.

== State reporting ==
These are a few of the federal forms. States have many equivalent forms and reporting requirements. Taken together, these tax information reporting forms affect hundreds of millions of individuals and businesses, and require a time commitment on the part of businesses, nonprofit organizations, and educational institutions to administer, prepare and file.

== Penalties ==
In its continual effort to enforce the tax laws and identify unreported and under-reported income, the IRS uses tax information returns in electronic cross-matching against income tax returns. Because of this reliance on receiving information returns from the payers of income, the IRS administers a system of assessing monetary penalties, which can be severe, on businesses and other entities that do not file all of the information returns they are required to file, or file the returns with errors that make it more difficult for the IRS to identify the taxpayers who received the income.

The deadline for filing 1099 forms is typically January 31st of each year. This means that both the payer and the recipient should have their copies by this date. Missing this deadline could result in penalties, making it crucial to maintain excellent organization.

== Tax gap ==
An increasing amount of attention, and government enforcement, is being focused on tax information reporting as the United States Congress and the federal administration seek ways to close the "tax gap" of over $300 billion annually that would be collected by the federal government if all income were reported by U.S. individuals and businesses.

== Proposed changes ==
Current proposals to the regulations include tax withholding on payments to independent contractors, a requirement for credit card companies to report to the IRS the gross receipts for businesses that accept their cards, and the elimination of corporate exemption to 1099 reporting.
