= Digital platform (infrastructure) =

Online infrastructure where users can exchange information

A digital platform is a software-based online infrastructure that facilitates user interactions and transactions.

Digital platforms can act as data aggregators to help users navigate large amounts of information, as is the case with search engines; as matchmakers to enable transactions between users, as is the case with digital marketplaces; or as collaborative tools to support the development of new content, as is the case with online communities. Digital platforms can also combine several of these features, such as when a social media platform enables both searching for information and matchmaking between users.

Digital platforms can be more or less decentralized in their data architecture and can be governed based on more or less distributed decision-making.

== Operations ==
Based on governance principles that can evolve, platforms shape how their users orchestrate digital resources to create social connections and perform market transactions. Digital platforms typically rely on big data stored in the cloud to perform algorithmic computations that facilitate user interactions. For instance, algorithms can be designed to analyze a user's historical preferences to provide targeted recommendations of new users with whom to connect or of new content likely to be of interest.

Platforms can be multisided, meaning that qualitatively different groups of users come to the platform to be matched with each other, such as buyers with sellers of goods, developers with users of applications, or consumers with advertisers. Digital platforms can thus act as catalogs, as marketplaces, as mediators, and as service providers, depending on their focus and the groups of users that they manage to attract. Platform operations are such that platform organizations "connect-and-coordinate" more often than they "command-and-control".

== Economic and social significance ==
Digital platforms orchestrate many aspects of our lives, from social interactions to consumption and mobility. That's why law and technology scholar Julie E. Cohen described the digital platform as "the core organizational form of the emerging informational economy" that can, in some circumstances, replace traditional markets.

While measuring the size of the platform economy in absolute terms is notably difficult due to methodological disagreements, there is consensus that revenues derived from digital platform transactions have been growing rapidly and steadily over the past twenty years, with the World Economic Forum estimating the growth to be 15-25% a year in emerging markets. As of October 5, 2020, the five most valuable corporations publicly listed in the U.S. were all primarily digital platform owners and operators (Apple, Microsoft, Amazon, Facebook, Alphabet) and so were the top two in China (Alibaba, Tencent).

Digital platforms also increasingly mediate the global labor markets as part of the so-called gig economy.

== Competition between digital platforms ==
Due to the existence of network effects, competition among digital platforms follows unique patterns studied from multiple perspectives in the fields of economics, management, innovation, and legal studies. One of the most striking features of digital platform competition is the strategic use of negative prices to subsidize growth. Negative prices happen, for instance, when a credit card company gives consumers cashback rewards on top of a free credit card to entice merchants to join their payment network. This represents a case of a platform subsidizing one side of the network (consumers) to attract users on the other side (merchants). More recently, another striking pattern has been the growing competition between centralized corporate platforms and decentralized blockchain platforms, such as the competition, in the banking sector, between traditional financial institutions and new "decentralized finance" (DeFi) ventures, or in the file hosting sector, between the likes of Dropbox, BOX, Amazon Cloud, SpiderOak, and Google Drive, on the one hand, and decentralized peer-to-peer alternative InterPlanetary File System, on the other.

== Impact on politics ==
Digital platforms have a significant influence on politics, through enabling rapid information sharing which has shaped public discourse and the spread of misinformation. Social media platforms, in particular such as Facebook, Google and Twitter have become instrumental to political campaigns, allowing politicians to spread their messages across these platforms. These platforms have used algorithms by analysing user behaviour and preferences to target messages toward influencing individuals. This has been seen in elections such as the 2016 UK European Union membership referendum where 'political bots' on digital platforms targeted older age groups with concerns on immigration for the argument that the U.K. should leave the European Union. The involvement of digital platforms in political campaigns has sparked lots of controversy. This has raised concerns on the impact that these digital platforms actually have in terms of influencing politics. There has been discussions and laws put in place to regulate the power these platforms have. Laws such as the Digital Services Act have been put in place to regulate and ensure digital programmes are abiding by content moderation, privacy, consent and data protection laws.

== Examples ==
Some of the most prominent digital platforms are owned, designed, and operated by for-profit corporations such as Google, Amazon, Facebook, Alibaba, Tencent, Baidu, and Yandex. By contrast, non-corporate digital platforms, including the Linux operating system, Wikipedia and Ethereum, are community-managed; they do not have shareholders nor do they employ executives in charge of achieving predefined goals.

== Criticism ==
Despite their notable ability to create value for individuals and businesses, large corporate platforms have received backlash in recent years. Some platforms have been suspected of anticompetitive behavior, of promoting a form of surveillance capitalism, of violating labor laws, and more generally, of shaping the contours of a digital dystopia. The digital platforms operating in social media operate a business model that nudges content creators toward circulating disinformation.
