= Instalment =

Instalment or installment may refer to:

== Economics and finance ==
- Equated monthly installment, a fixed payment amount made by a borrower to a lender at a specified date each calendar month
- Installment Agreement, an Internal Revenue Service program that allows individuals to pay tax debt in monthly payments
- Installment loan, a loan that is repaid over time with a set number of scheduled payments
- Installment note, a form of promissory note calling for payment of both principal and interest in specified amounts at specific time intervals
- Installment plan, an arrangement whereby a customer agrees to a contract to acquire an asset by paying an initial installment and repaying the balance of the price of the asset plus interest over a period of time
- Installment sale, a disposition of property where at least 1 loan payment is to be received after the close of the taxable year in which the disposition occurs
  - Monetized installment sale, a special type of installment sale whereby a seller of appreciated assets attempts to defer U.S. federal income tax liability over a period of years while currently receiving cash or other liquid assets via a monetization transaction
- Installment sales method, an approach used to recognize revenue under the U.S. GAAP, specifically when revenue and expense are recognized at the time of cash collection rather than at the time of sale

== Media ==
- An entry in a book, film, or video game series
- An episode of a podcast, radio, television, or web series
- Serial (literature), a printing or publishing format by which a single larger work is published in smaller, sequential installments

== Other uses ==
- Installation (Christianity), or installment, the enthronement of a bishop
