= Private annuity trust =

Before 2006, a private annuity trust (PAT) was an arrangement to enable the value of highly appreciated assets, such as real estate, collectables or an investment portfolio, to be realized without directly selling them and incurring substantial taxes from their sale.

A PAT was used to defer United States federal capital gains tax on the sale of an asset, to provide a stream of income, and in effect to remove the asset from the owner's estate, thus reducing or eliminating estate taxes. With these advantages, a PAT provided an alternative to other methods of deferring capital gains taxes, such as the charitable remainder trust (CRT), installment sale, or tax-deferred 1031 exchange.

As of October 2006 the Internal Revenue Service (IRS) proposed a rule that would have provided that the PAT was no longer a valid capital gains tax deferral method. Those persons who used the PAT before the IRS ruling were to be grandfathered in and would continue to result in tax deferral benefits.

Before October 2006, PATs were attractive to sellers of highly appreciated real estate. A PAT allowed the owner of investment property to defer up to 100% of the taxes without ever having to buy another property. This is very important because good quality investment properties are difficult to locate. The PAT also allowed the seller of a highly appreciated primary residence to defer up to 100% of the taxes as well. This is important because all gains on primary residences over $250,000 for a single person and $500,000 for a married couple will be taxed if a PAT is not used.

A properly structured PAT involves first transferring the asset to the PAT in return for a lifetime income stream in the form of an annuity. The transfer of the asset is not a taxable transaction. A PAT is not issued by a commercial insurance company. Anytime after the asset is placed into the PAT, the asset can be sold without taxation to the trust. There is no tax on the sale to the PAT because the PAT has actually purchased the asset from the owner for the fair market value of the asset. The PAT pays the owner for the asset with a lifetime income stream. The PAT has a basis equal to the fair market value so the PAT can sell the asset for fair market value and not be subject to taxation. The original owner of the asset pays taxes only on the PAT payments received, not on the transfer of the asset to the PAT.

PAT payment amounts are based on IRS Life expectancy tables for a single individual, or for the joint lives of the asset owner and his or her spouse. The lifetime annuity payments are then made from the PAT assets and/or investment earnings from asset or, alternately, the asset is sold and the proceeds are reinvested by the trustee to fund the payments. PAT payments are calculated using an IRS formula based on the age of the asset owner(s), the value of the asset, and the current IRS interest rate called the Applicable Federal Rate (AFR). PAT payments can be made monthly, quarterly, or annually.

Neither the transfer of the asset to the trust nor its later sale is subject to income taxes if, as is usually the case, the annuity payment is established at a level that gives the annuity a present value equal to the value of the asset sold. However, each annuity payment when received will be partially taxable on the share of capital gains, depreciation recapture and ordinary income included in the payment. The portion representing recovery of original tax basis is not taxable.

To preserve the benefits of a PAT, a trustee must be independent, the annuity cannot be secured in any way, and annuitants cannot have any control over the trust or its investments. Informal suggestions and advice, however, are not prohibited.

The primary benefit of a PAT is that it allows the full appreciated value of the asset to be invested and to earn income before capital gains and recapture taxes are paid. This means that the incurrence of tax liability can be stretched out over the owner's entire lifetime. The IRS does not charge any interest or penalties for this form of tax deferral. If the trust's earnings are greater than the annuity amounts paid, the excess value will accrue or can be paid out to the ultimate beneficiaries. The owner's heirs who will also receive any remaining investments in the PAT completely free of estate taxes after the owner has died. If the owner dies before living out his or her life expectancy, the trust might be required to pay a portion of the deferred capital gains taxes. On the other hand, in most cases if the owner lives at least 2/3 of his or her life expectancy, the trust will receive additional tax benefits.

The investment of the pre-tax proceeds potentially gives private annuity trusts the ability to generate substantially more money over the long run than a direct and taxed sale. Partially offsetting this advantage are the compressed income tax brackets for trusts that cause the investment earnings to reach the maximum income tax bracket when income exceeds $9,000–$10,000 annually. The PAT is not allowed to deduct the amount of imputed interest built into the annuity payments that it makes. Sometimes the PAT will invest in a deferred annuity in an effort to minimize trust income taxes, but at the expense of sizable commissions, fees, and taxes. Investing PAT assets in a deferred annuity issued by a commercial insurance company should be avoided at ALL costs.

Potential benefits from a private annuity trust include lifetime income, deferral of capital gains and depreciation recapture, investment flexibility and diversification, enhancement of retirement income, and tax-free inheritance of the remaining trust funds by the designated beneficiaries. These benefits in many cases enabled a PAT to provide superior results as compared to a charitable remainder trust (CRT), installment sale, or tax-deferred 1031 exchange.

== Subsequent developments ==
After October 2006 the PAT is no longer a method to defer capital gains taxes. Allstate Insurance developed the structured sale which uses a structured annuity. The structured sale (ensured installment sale) has generally been considered to be a much superior tax deferral method to the PAT. However, this is heavily debated by E. Anthony Reguero, who contends that if used properly, the private annuity trust is superior to the structured sale both in terms of the tax benefits to the beneficiary or client as well as the number of ways the IRS can benefit by taxing the trust.

== Alternatives ==
Following changes to the tax treatment of private annuities, several other transactions based on installment sale law have become increasingly popular. These have included: structured sales, installment sales trusts, deferred sales trusts, and monetized installment sale. Monetized installment sales have been used by several public companies to help defer recognition of capital gains while monetizing the value of the appreciated assets they have sold.
