= Exchange fund =

U.S. investment fund

An exchange fund, also known as a swap fund, is a private investment vehicle that allows investors holding large, appreciated positions in publicly traded stock to pool their shares into a single fund, diversifying their holdings without triggering a taxable event. Each investor contributes concentrated stock and receives a proportional interest in the fund, which holds a diversified portfolio of contributed securities.

The tax treatment depends on provisions of the U.S. Internal Revenue Code, making exchange funds a mechanism specific to the United States. The legal foundation was established as early as the 1930s through Section 351 exchanges, and the modern partnership-based structure traces to the codification of 26 U.S.C. § 721 in 1954.

The primary benefit is diversification of a concentrated stock position while deferring capital gains taxes. The tax is not eliminated, but deferred: the full pre-tax value of the contributed stock remains invested, avoiding the tax drag that results from selling, paying capital gains, and reinvesting a smaller post-tax amount. When the diversified holdings are eventually sold, tax is due on the difference between the sales price and the original cost basis of the contributed stock, which carries over throughout the process.

== Background ==
Exchange funds address a common dilemma faced by investors who hold highly appreciated stock, particularly executives, founders, and employees who have accumulated equity compensation over time. Research by Hendrik Bessembinder has shown that stock market wealth creation is highly concentrated in a small number of firms — only 4% of publicly traded U.S. stocks accounted for the entirety of net shareholder wealth creation between 1926 and 2025, while the majority of individual stocks underperformed Treasury bills over their lifetimes. This concentration of returns means that holding a single stock carries significant long-term risk relative to a diversified portfolio.

Investors in this position face a tradeoff: selling the stock to diversify triggers a large capital gains tax liability, while continuing to hold it exposes the investor to concentration risk. The capital gains tax on a sale reduces the amount of capital available for reinvestment, and this tax drag compounds over time. Exchange funds offer a path between these two options by allowing the investor to diversify while deferring the tax event.

== History ==
Exchange funds have existed in various forms since the 1930s, when Section 351 of the Internal Revenue Code established the principle of tax-free transfers of property to corporations in exchange for stock. Early "swap funds" were generally structured as corporations due to securities law constraints and limitations in state partnership laws at the time.

The Internal Revenue Code of 1954 codified 26 U.S.C. § 721, extending the principle of nonrecognition of gain or loss to contributions of property to a partnership. As state partnership laws evolved through the 1960s and early 1970s, swap funds increasingly adopted partnership structures. In 1975, Eaton Vance obtained a favorable private letter ruling from the IRS confirming the tax-free treatment of securities exchanged for partnership interests, which established the template for modern exchange funds.

Congress responded to this development in the Tax Reform Act of 1976, which added Section 721(b) to require recognition of gain when appreciated securities are transferred to a partnership that would be treated as an "investment company" if incorporated. To avoid this classification, exchange funds must hold a minimum percentage of qualifying non-investment assets, giving rise to the structural requirement that at least 20% of fund assets consist of illiquid holdings such as real estate.

For decades, exchange funds were offered exclusively by a small number of institutional wealth managers, primarily Goldman Sachs and Morgan Stanley (through Eaton Vance), serving ultra-high-net-worth clients who met the qualified purchaser threshold of $5 million or more in investments, with minimum contributions of $500,000 to $1 million. More recently, newer providers like Cache have launched exchange funds structured to track established market benchmarks such as the Nasdaq-100 and S&P 500, with minimums as low as $100,000.

== Legal framework ==
The tax-deferred treatment of exchange funds rests on several interconnected provisions of the Internal Revenue Code.

Section 721(a) provides the general rule: no gain or loss is recognized by a partnership or its partners when property is contributed to the partnership in exchange for a partnership interest. This allows investors to contribute appreciated stock to an exchange fund without triggering capital gains taxes at the time of contribution.

Section 721(b), added by the Tax Reform Act of 1976, creates an exception: if the partnership would be treated as an "investment company" under the standards of Internal Revenue Code section 351 were it incorporated, gain is recognized on the transfer. The investment company test under the Treasury regulations generally treats a partnership as an investment company if more than 80% of its assets consist of stocks, securities, and similar investment assets.

The 20% qualifying asset rule derives from this investment company test. Exchange funds avoid investment company classification by ensuring that at least 20% of their assets consist of qualifying illiquid assets that are not treated as investment assets under Section 351(e)(1)(B). In practice, this typically means holding interests in real estate. This requirement is structural — it exists to satisfy the tax code. The real estate is typically acquired using leverage (borrowed capital), which means the allocation can be accretive to fund performance when the real estate returns exceed the cost of borrowing. However, leverage also amplifies losses if real estate underperforms its funding cost.

Cost basis carries over from the contributed stock to the investor's partnership interest under Section 722, and then to the securities received upon redemption. This means the investor's original cost basis follows the investment through the entire lifecycle of participation in the fund.

== How exchange funds work ==
Exchange funds are structured as private limited partnerships under Regulation D, which governs private placements. Each investor becomes a limited partner in the fund.

Contribution. Investors contribute shares of publicly traded stock during specific contribution windows. The fund accepts stocks in proportions designed to achieve a particular investment objective, such as approximating the composition of a market index. Because the fund has specific diversification targets, capacity for any given stock may be limited, and not all stocks may be accepted at all times.

Fund composition. A typical exchange fund holds a diversified portfolio of contributed equities alongside at least 20% in qualifying illiquid assets (primarily real estate interests) required by the tax code. The equity portion is constructed to target a specific benchmark or investment objective.

Holding period. To qualify for tax-deferred treatment, the current tax code requires investors to hold their investment in the fund for at least seven years. If an investor redeems before seven years, they generally receive back their original contributed stock rather than a diversified basket, typically at the lesser of the original contribution value or the current net asset value of their shares. Early redemption penalties may also apply.

Redemption. After the seven-year holding period, investors may withdraw a diversified basket of securities from the fund. The investor's original cost basis carries over to the redeemed securities. Taxes become due only when those securities are eventually sold.

Estate planning. Under current tax law, heirs who inherit exchange fund interests may benefit from a stepped-up basis at the original holder's death, potentially eliminating the deferred capital gains entirely.

== Eligibility ==
Exchange funds require investors to meet specific regulatory thresholds:

Traditional exchange fund providers — Goldman Sachs, Morgan Stanley/Eaton Vance — typically require investors to be qualified purchasers with at least $5 million in investable assets, with minimum contributions of $500,000 to $1 million in publicly traded stock.

Cache's exchange funds also serve qualified purchasers, but with lower contribution minimums starting at $100,000. Cache additionally offers an Access Series of exchange funds available to accredited investors — those with annual income of $200,000 ($300,000 jointly with a spouse) or net worth of $1 million excluding a primary residence.

Only publicly traded securities can be contributed. Privately held stock is generally not eligible.

== Benefits and risks ==
Exchange funds can benefit long-term investors by allowing them to diversify concentrated positions while keeping the full pre-tax value of their stock invested, to defer capital gains taxes that would otherwise reduce their investable capital, to reduce the correlated risk of holding both employment income and a large equity stake in the same company, and to maintain flexibility over when (or whether) to realize capital gains in the future.

The primary risks and limitations include limited liquidity during the seven-year holding period, investment risk inherent in any equity portfolio (diversification reduces concentration risk but does not eliminate market risk), the possibility that tax laws could change during the holding period (though existing investments may be grandfathered), leverage risk on the real estate allocation (since the qualifying illiquid assets are typically acquired with borrowed capital, underperformance relative to funding costs can reduce overall fund returns), and the constraint that exchange funds generally do not sell contributed stocks, limiting the ability to rebalance as aggressively as other investment vehicles.

== Notable participants ==
SEC Form 4 filings, which corporate insiders are required to submit when they transact in their company's securities, document exchange fund participation spanning virtually every sector of the U.S. economy.

Notable participants include Adobe co-founder John Warnock, Broadcom CEO Hock Tan, and Nvidia CFO Colette Kress in technology; Moody's CEO Raymond McDaniel and Visa executive Kelly Mahon Tullier in financial services; Humana director David Jones Jr. in healthcare; the O'Reilly Automotive founding family and Tractor Supply board chair Cynthia Jamison in consumer and retail; and executives at industrials including Masco, Curtiss-Wright, and Applied Industrial Technologies.

Many executives file repeatedly over multiple years. Broadcom's Tan has filed seven exchange fund transactions since 2022, and Moody's McDaniel filed more than ten between 2021 and 2023, indicating that exchange fund contributions are often a recurring component of executive financial planning rather than a one-time event.

Exchange funds first attracted broad media attention when senator Mitt Romney's participation in Goldman Sachs exchange funds was reported during the 2012 presidential election. Philanthropist Eli Broad was identified as an exchange fund user in a 1996 New York Times investigation into tax strategies used by wealthy individuals.

== Policy considerations ==
There is public policy disagreement about whether the tax deferral provided by exchange funds serves the public interest.

Proponents argue that exchange funds reduce deadweight loss in the economy. Without a tax-deferred path to diversification, many holders of appreciated stock choose to hold their concentrated positions indefinitely and borrow against them rather than sell — a practice sometimes described as "buy, borrow, die," in which the investor never realizes capital gains during their lifetime and their heirs receive a stepped-up basis that eliminates the deferred tax entirely. Under this alternative, no capital gains tax is ever collected. Exchange funds, by contrast, create a path to eventual diversification and liquidation: the investor's original cost basis carries through, and capital gains tax is owed when the redeemed securities are eventually sold. Proponents contend that exchange funds therefore generate tax revenue that would otherwise never materialize, while unlocking concentrated capital for productive reallocation in the broader economy.

Opponents argue that exchange funds primarily serve wealthy investors, enabling them to defer significant tax liabilities for extended periods. Critics have also noted that because exchange funds require either accredited investor or qualified purchaser status, the benefits are unavailable to ordinary taxpayers.

== See also ==
- Capital gains tax in the United States
- Diversification (finance)
- Concentration risk
- Like-kind exchange
- Tax deferral
- Accredited investor
- Stepped-up basis
