= Tenants-in-common 1031 exchange =

Tenants in common 1031 Exchange is a form of real estate asset ownership in the United States in which two or more persons have an undivided, fractional interest in the asset, where ownership shares are not required to be equal, and where ownership interests can be inherited. Each co-owner receives an individual deed at closing for his or her undivided percentage interest in the entire property. In brief, a TIC owner has the same rights and benefits as a single owner of property.

Although the TIC ownership form has been used for many years, its popularity has recently started increasing dramatically due to IRS ruling. Exchangers often have difficulty in locating and closing suitable replacement property within the 45-day identification period and the 180-day closing period. 1031 TIC exchanges can significantly reduce these risks.

== How a 1031 exchange is accomplished ==
The following sequence represents the order of steps in a typical 1031 exchange.

1. An investor decides to sell investment property and do a 1031 exchange. He contacts a qualified intermediary (QI) and they enter into an agreement.
2. The investment property is placed on the market.
3. An offer to purchase the investment property is accepted and signed by the QI.
4. Escrow for the sale is opened, and a preliminary title report is produced.
5. The QI sends required exchange documents to the escrow closer for signing at property closing.
6. Escrow closes.
7. Within the first 45 days after the close of escrow on the sale of the relinquished property, the investor identifies replacement properties as required by law. This is known as the "Identification Period".
8. Within 180 days after the close of escrow on the sale of the relinquished property, the investor closes on one of the replacement properties which he has identified. This is called the "Exchange Period". This completes the exchange. No cash – or boot, as it is known – is taken by the exchanger.

== An alternative to the 1031 exchange ==
A structured sale annuity or "Ensured Installment Sale" is a capital gains tax deferral tool that enables the seller to gain benefits that other sales and capital gains deferral methods do not offer. It is a hybrid of the common installment sale and a structured annuity, and it enables the seller to collect a stream of payments, leverage equity, earn a pre-tax return, and other benefits. This method is a tool for those who want to do a 1031 exchange but cannot find a property within the time frame, and it allows the seller to have a backup plan.

== See also ==
- See 1031 exchange for the traditional use of IRS regulation 1031
