= Companies of the United States with untaxed profits =

Companies of the United States with untaxed profits deals with those U.S. companies whose offshore subsidiaries earn profits which are retained in foreign countries to defer paying U.S. corporate tax. The profits of United States corporations are subject to a federal corporate tax rate of 21%. In principle, the tax is payable on all profits of corporations, whether earned domestically or abroad. However, overseas subsidiaries of U.S. corporations are entitled to a tax deferral of profits on active income until repatriated to the U.S., and are regarded as untaxed. When repatriated, the corporations are entitled to a foreign tax credit for taxes (if any) paid in foreign countries.

Retaining such profits offshore may be regarded as a tax strategy. Many corporations have accumulated substantial untaxed profits offshore, especially in countries with low corporate tax rates. The Wall Street Journal noted that the "[u]ntaxed foreign earnings are part of a contentious debate over U.S. fiscal policy and tax code." The profits earned abroad and retained there are subject to a foreign exchange risk, besides other financial risks.

The downside of a strategy of retaining profits offshore is that corporations may want or need to pay dividends to shareholders, or to make investments in the United States, besides other reasons. The alternative may be to borrow funds in the U.S., or access the funds retained offshore in the form of inter-company loans.

The Tax Cuts and Jobs Act of 2017 (TCJA) imposed a one time tax on these offshore profits at 8% (non-cash) and 15.5% (cash) respectively. The Act also includes a provision that taxes all foreign profits in the US in the year they are earned ending the ability of US companies to defer paying US tax on unrepatriated earnings.

== Politics and tax policy issues ==
It has been suggested that companies were holding profits overseas hoping for a repatriation tax holiday. In 2012 Northwestern University law professor Thomas Brennan asserted that "companies are holding money outside the U.S. in part because they are waiting for Congress to repeat a 2004 tax holiday law that set a maximum tax rate for repatriation profits of 5.25%. 'Why not do it?' he said. 'It’s pure upside. In the worst-case scenario, you’re going to be taxed as you would have been in any event.'" The 2004 tax holiday, under President George W. Bush, yielded a lot of repatriation but not much economic benefit, according to one view. A number of the large U.S.-based companies that would benefit, including Google, Cisco Systems Inc., Qualcomm Inc. and Oracle Corp., were lobbying during 2011-2012 to obtain a repatriation holiday. At the time, however, President Obama was believed to oppose a one-time tax holiday, as it would be a giveaway to big corporations.

President Obama's February 2015 budget proposal called for a 14% tax to be applied on untaxed overseas profits, indicating that the proposal would yield $238 billion, implying a $1.7 trillion estimate of untaxed profits. It was proposed as a one-time tax to be imposed whether or not funds are repatriated. The proposal has not been heard about since.

In 2015, the topic of U.S. taxation of companies' operations abroad was addressed by several potential U.S. presidential candidates. For example, Republican senators Marco Rubio and Mike Lee have called for elimination of U.S. taxes on companies' operations abroad, within a broader proposal for corporate and individual tax rate changes.

== Comparative tax rates ==
Corporate tax rates vary between tax jurisdictions. The national rates of Organisation for Economic Co-operation and Development (OECD) countries vary from a low of 8.5% in Switzerland to a high of 35% in the United States, with an average of 22%. In addition to the federal tax rates, provincial, state and local taxes may also apply in most jurisdictions. For example, the 2015 provincial corporate tax rates in Canada range from 11.5% to 16% in addition to the federal tax rate of 15%, unless taxable profits of small corporations are low enough to qualify for a lower tax rate.

In comparing national corporate tax rates one should also take into account the taxes on dividends paid to shareholders. For example, the overall U.S. tax on corporate profits of 35% is less than or similar to that of European countries such as Germany, Ireland, Switzerland and the United Kingdom, which have lower corporate tax rates but higher taxes on dividends paid to shareholders.

Many large multinational companies retain untaxed profits in tax haven jurisdictions which offer no or very low corporate taxes, as well as other tax benefits.

== List of companies with untaxed profits ==
During 2018, 91 Fortune 500 companies "paid an effective federal tax rate of 0% or less" as a result of Donald Trump´s Tax Cuts and Jobs Act of 2017. Large U.S. multinational companies which are known to have significant untaxed profits include:

- General Electric
- Microsoft
- Pfizer
- Merck & Co
- Apple
- Google
- Medtronic
- Abbott Laboratories
- Johnson & Johnson
- Honeywell

== See also ==
- Tax inversion
- Microsoft Corp. v. Internal Revenue Service
- Repatriation tax holiday
