= Internal Revenue Code section 1031 =

Defer capital gains tax on real property

A Section 1031 exchange, commonly known as a like-kind exchange, is a transaction under the 26 U.S.C. § 1031 of the Internal Revenue Code that allows owners of investment or business real estate to defer certain taxes when selling property and reinvesting the proceeds into other qualifying real property. It is most commonly used by real estate investors and property owners with low tax basis, for whom an outright sale would otherwise trigger capital gains tax and depreciation recapture. By exchanging rather than selling, taxpayers may defer recognition of these taxes while maintaining continuity of investment in real estate.

Section 1031 exchanges are frequently used as part of long-term real estate investment and estate-planning strategies. Because the exchange defers, rather than eliminates, tax liability by carrying forward the taxpayer’s adjusted basis, investors may continue exchanging properties over time. If the property is held until death, the deferred gain may be eliminated through a step-up in basis under U.S. tax law, a feature that has made Section 1031 exchanges particularly common among long-term property owners seeking to defer taxes across generations.

Before 2018, section 1031 also applied to certain exchanges of personal property, but the Tax Cuts and Jobs Act of 2017 limited nonrecognition treatment to exchanges of real property.

== Summary ==
To qualify for section 1031 treatment, both the relinquished property and the replacement property must be real property held for productive use in a trade or business or for investment, and not held primarily for sale. Properties are of like kind if they are of the same nature or character, even if they differ in grade or quality; in general, most interests in real property in the United States are treated as of like kind to one another.

Real properties generally are of like kind, regardless of whether the properties are improved or unimproved. However, a real property within the United States and a real property outside the United States would not be like-kind properties. Generally, "like kind" in terms of real estate, means any property that is classified real estate in any of the 50 U.S. states or Washington, D.C., and in some cases, the U.S. Virgin Islands.

Taxpayers who hold real estate as inventory, or who purchase real estate for re-sale, are considered "dealers". These properties are not eligible for Section 1031 treatment. However, if a taxpayer is a dealer and also an investor, he or she can use Section 1031 on qualifying like properties. Personal use property will not qualify for Section 1031.

Taxpayers may wonder whether items such as equipment used on a property are included in the lump-sum sale of the property, and whether recognition of related gains may be deferred. Under Treasury regulation §1.1031(k)-1(c)(5)(i), property that is transferred together with the larger item of value that does not exceed 15% of the fair market value of the larger property does not need to be identified within the 45-day identification period, but still needs to be exchanged for like kind property to defer gain.

Cash to equalize a transaction cannot be deferred under Code Section 1031 because cash is not of like kind. This cash is called "boot" and the gain, to the extent of the receipt of this cash, is taxed at ordinary income tax rates.

If liabilities assumed by the buyer exceed those of the seller (taxpayer), the realized gain of the seller will be recognized. If, however, the seller assumes a greater liability than the buyer, the realized loss cannot offset any realized and recognized gain of receiving boot such as cash or other personal property considered boot.

Originally, 1031 cases needed to be simultaneous transfers of ownership. But after the rendering of the decision in Starker v. United States, a contract to exchange properties in the future is practically the same as a simultaneous transfer. This case invented the concept of the Starker exchange. It is under this case, decided in 1979, that the rules for election of a delayed 1031 originated. To elect the 1031 recognition, a taxpayer must identify the property for exchange before closing, identify the replacement property within 45 days of closing, and acquire the replacement property within 180 days of closing. A Qualified Intermediary must also be used to facilitate the transaction, by holding all the profits from the sale, and then disbursing those monies at the closing, or sometimes for fees associated with acquiring the new property.

== Section 1031 like-kind exchanges ==
Section 1031(a) of the Internal Revenue Code (26 U.S.C. § 1031) states the recognition rules for realized gains (or losses) that arise as a result of an exchange of like-kind property held for productive use in trade or business or for investment. It states that none of the realized gain or loss will be recognized at the time of the exchange.

It also states that the property to be exchanged must be identified within 45 days, and received within 180 days.

1031(b) states when like-kind property and boot can be received. The gain is recognized to the extent of boot received.

1031(c) covers cases similar to those in 1031(b), except when the transaction results in a loss. The loss is not recognized at the time of the transaction, but must be carried forward in the form of a higher basis on the property received.

1031(d) defines the basis calculation for property acquired during a like-kind exchange. It states that the basis of the new property is the same as the basis of the property given up, minus any money received by the taxpayer, plus any gain (or minus any loss) recognized on the transaction. If the transaction falls under 1031(b) or (c), the basis shall be allocated between the properties received (other than money) and for purposes of allocation, there shall be assigned to such other property, an amount equivalent to its fair market value at the date of the exchange.

1031(e) stipulates that livestock of different sexes do not qualify for like-kind exchange.

1031(h)(1) stipulates that real property outside the United States and real property located in the United States are not of like kind.

The sale of the relinquished property and the acquisition of the replacement property do not have to be simultaneous. A non-simultaneous exchange is sometimes called a Starker tax-deferred exchange, named for an investor who won a case against the Internal Revenue Service (IRS).

For a non-simultaneous exchange, the taxpayer must use a Qualified Intermediary, follow guidelines of the IRS, and use the proceeds of the sale to buy qualifying, like-kind, investment or business property. The replacement property must be "identified" within 45 days after the sale of the old property and the acquisition of the replacement property must be completed within 180 days of the sale of the old property.

As of 2018, Section 1031 can only be used in connection with sales of real property. Prior to the 2018 tax law changes, exchanges of personal property could qualify under Section 1031. Exchanges of shares of corporate stock in different companies did not qualify. Also not qualifying were exchanges of partnership interests in different partnerships and exchanges of livestock of different sexes. However, as of a 2002 IRS ruling (see tenants in common 1031 exchange), tenants-in-common (TIC) exchanges are allowed. For real property exchanges under Section 1031, any property that is considered "real property" under the law of the state where the property is located will be considered "like-kind" so long as both the old and the new property are held by the owner for investment, or for active use in a trade or business, or for the production of income.

In order to obtain full benefit, the replacement property must be of equal or greater value, and all of the proceeds from the relinquished property must be used to acquire the replacement property. The taxpayer cannot receive the proceeds of the sale of the old property; doing so will disqualify the exchange for the portion of the sale proceeds that the taxpayer received. For this reason, exchanges (particularly non-simultaneous changes) are typically structured so that the taxpayer's interest in the relinquished property is assigned to a Qualified Intermediary prior to the close of the sale. In this way, the taxpayer does not have access to or control over the funds when the sale of the old property closes.

At the close of the relinquished property sale, the proceeds are sent by the closing agent (typically a title company, escrow company, or closing attorney) to the Qualified Intermediary, who holds the funds until such time as the transaction for the acquisition of the replacement property is ready to close. Then the proceeds from the sale of the relinquished property are deposited by the Qualified Intermediary to purchase the replacement property. After the acquisition of the replacement property closes, the Qualified Intermediary delivers the property to the taxpayer, all without the taxpayer ever having constructive receipt of the funds.

The prevailing idea behind the 1031 exchange is that since the taxpayer is merely exchanging one property for another property (or more) of "like-kind", there is nothing received by the taxpayer that can be used to pay taxes. In addition, the taxpayer has a continuity of investment by replacing the old property. All gain is still locked up in the exchanged property and so no gain or loss is recognized or claimed for income tax purposes.

=== Boot ===
Although the term "boot" does not appear in the Internal Revenue Code, it is commonly used to describe money and the fair market value of other non–like-kind property received by the taxpayer in an exchange. To the extent a taxpayer receives boot, gain is recognized up to the amount of boot received.

There are many ways for a taxpayer to receive boot, even inadvertently. The most common sources of boot include:

- Cash boot taken from the exchange. This will usually be in the form of "net cash received", or the difference between cash received from the sale of the relinquished property and cash paid to acquire the replacement property (or properties). Net cash received can result when a taxpayer is "trading down" in the exchange, when the sale price of replacement property is less than that of the relinquished.
- Debt reduction boot, which occurs when a taxpayer's debt on replacement property is less than the debt which was on the relinquished property. As with cash boot, debt reduction boot can occur when a taxpayer is trading down in the exchange. Debt reduction can be offset with cash used to purchase the replacement property.
- Sale proceeds being used to pay non-qualified expenses, such as service costs at closing which are not closing expenses. If proceeds from the sale are used to service non-transaction costs at closing, the result is the same as if the taxpayer had received cash from the exchange, and then used the cash to pay these costs.
- Excess borrowing to acquire replacement property. Borrowing more money than is necessary to close on replacement property will not result in the taxpayer receiving tax-free money from the closing. The funds from the loan will be the first to be applied toward the purchase. If the addition of exchange funds creates a surplus at the closing, all unused exchange funds will be returned to the Qualified Intermediary, presumably to be used to acquire more replacement property.
- Non-like-kind property which is received from the exchange, in addition to like-kind property (real estate).

== Section 1031 and second residences ==
There is and has been much confusion surrounding the use of section 1031 and second residences. Although most taxpayers purchase second residences with the expectation of appreciation, the Service has ruled that properties that are purchased for personal use are not investment properties, and therefore do not qualify for section 1031 treatment.

Until 2008 many people were exchanging in and out of second properties as there was little to no guidance surrounding what did and did not constitute property held for investment. Finally, in Revenue Procedure 2008-16 the IRS clearly defined what is acceptable. This revenue procedure creates a safe harbor for taxpayers wishing to use section 1031 with properties that follow a simple set of rules:

For a minimum of two years prior to, and after the exchange:

- The property must be rented for a minimum of 2 weeks to a non-relative.
- You can rent to a relative if it is their primary residence at fair market value rent.
- The property must only be used personally for 2 weeks or 10% of the time rented.
- You can maintain the property for an unlimited amount of time, but documentation must be kept for these activities.
- The property should be placed on Schedule E of your tax return and reported as income property.

=== Vacation property ===
For dwelling units (such as vacation houses), the IRS established a safe harbor in Rev. Proc. 2008-16 under which the Service will not challenge investment intent if specified rental and limited personal-use conditions are met around the exchange.

== Time limits ==
The §1031 exchange begins on the earliest of the following:

1. the date the deed records, or
2. the date possession is transferred to the buyer,

and ends on the earlier of the following:

1. 180 days after it begins, or
2. the date the Exchanger's tax return is due, including extensions, for the taxable year in which the relinquished property is transferred.

The identification period is the first 45 days of the exchange period. The exchange period is a maximum of 180 days. If the Exchanger has multiple relinquished properties, the deadlines begin on the transfer date of the first property. These deadlines may not be extended for any reason, except for the declaration of a Presidentially declared disaster.

A deadline that falls on any weekend day or holiday does not permit extension. For example, if your tax return is due April 15, but that date falls on a Saturday, then your tax return due date is forwarded to the first business day following April 15, or Monday, April 17. However, if a deadline falls on a Sunday, the requirements for the exchange must be met no later than the last business day prior to the deadline date, i.e. the prior Friday.

Identified replacement property that is destroyed by fire, flood, hurricane, etc. after expiration of the 45-day Identification Period does not entitle the Exchanger to identify a new property. However, the exchange may be terminated by this event so long as it is (a) specified in writing (such as a contingency in the sales contract); (b) is outside the control of the exchanger or any party to the exchange; and (c) is the only or last property that the exchanger is entitled to purchase under the exchange rules.

Mistakenly identifying condominium A, when condominium B was intended, does not permit a change in identification after the 45-day Identification Period expires. Failure to comply with these deadlines may result in a failed exchange.

IRS rules control the length of time that the replacement property must be held before it may either be sold or used to enter into a new tax deferred exchange. In highly appreciating markets, people may take the opportunity of selling their personal residence (where no capital gain is due below $250,000 for a single person or $500,000 for a married couple, see Taxpayer Relief Act of 1997) and moving into a former rental property for a specified time period in order to turn it into their new personal residence. With recent legislation, however, capital gains taxes on such a transaction are no longer completely avoided. The taxpayer will now owe a diminishing amount of capital gains taxes on the conversion of property from rental to personal residence once the final disposition of the property occurs.

In order to qualify for this exchange, certain rules must be followed:

1. Both the relinquished property and the replacement property must be held either for investment or for productive use in a trade or business. A personal residence cannot be exchanged.
2. The asset must be of like-kind. Real property must be exchanged for real property, although a broad definition of real estate applies and includes land, commercial property and residential property. Personal property must be exchanged for personal property. (There are some complicated rules surrounding this, for example, livestock of opposite sex are not considered like-kind property for the purpose of a 1031 exchange, and property outside the United States is not considered of "like-kind" with property in the United States.)
3. The proceeds of the sale must be re-invested in a like kind asset within 180 days of the sale. Restrictions are imposed on the number of properties which can be identified as potential Replacement Properties. More than one potential replacement property can be identified as long as you satisfy one of these rules:
  - The Three-Property Rule - Up to three properties regardless of their market values. All identified properties are not required to be purchased to satisfy the exchange; only the amount needed to satisfy the value requirement.
  - The 200% Rule - Any number of properties as long as the aggregate fair market value of all replacement properties does not exceed 200% of the aggregate Fair Market Value (FMV) of all of the relinquished properties as of the initial transfer date. All identified properties are not required to be purchased to satisfy the exchange; only the amount needed to satisfy the value requirement.
  - The 95% Rule - Any number of replacement properties if the fair market value of the properties actually received by the end of the exchange period is at least 95% of the aggregate FMV of all the potential replacement properties identified. In other words, 95% (or all) of the properties identified must be purchased or the entire exchange is invalid. An exception to the 95% rule is that if you close on a property within the 45 day period it still qualifies for the exchange.

=== Difficulties involved in meeting limits ===
Frequently, the most difficult component of a 1031 exchange is identifying a replacement property within the first 45 days following the sale of the relinquished property. The IRS is strict in not allowing extensions.

Practitioners report that locating and securing suitable replacement property within the 45-day identification and 180-day completion windows is a common hurdle, particularly in tight markets and complex transactions. By regulation, the identification must be in writing within 45 days, and the exchange must be completed by the earlier of 180 days or the return due date (with extensions) for the year of transfer.

A 1031 exchange is similar to a traditional IRA or 401(k) retirement plan. When someone sells assets in tax-deferred retirement plans, the capital gains that would otherwise be taxable are deferred until the holder begins to cash out of the retirement plan. The same principle holds true for tax-deferred exchanges or real estate investments. As long as the money continues to be re-invested in other real estate, the capital gains taxes can be deferred. Unlike the aforementioned retirement accounts, rental income on real estate investments will continue to be taxed as net income is realized.

Certain interests in Delaware statutory trusts (DSTs) holding real property can qualify as like-kind real property for section 1031 purposes, subject to conditions described in IRS guidance. Many accredited investors will consider a Delaware Statutory Trust to complete their 1031 exchange. An alternative to a 1031 exchange for someone who wants to defer capital gains tax, but who does not want to continue to hold property is a structured sale. This method offers both buyer and seller many benefits and is regarded as an excellent possibility for those looking to retire from or exit from the real estate or business market. However, capital gains tax will be assessed as the payments are received by the seller, unlike a 1031 exchange, whereby the capital gains tax can be deferred indefinitely for the exchanging individual.

== Reverse 1031 exchange ==
In most cases, a 1031 exchange proceeds as described above, where the relinquished property is first sold, then the replacement property is purchased. The IRS has also determined that the reverse sequence also will avoid capital gains taxes, provided certain requirements are met. This is called a "reverse 1031" or "reverse Starker". In a reverse like-kind exchange, the taxpayer acquires the replacement property before transferring the relinquished property. The IRS has provided a safe harbor for certain “parking” arrangements under which an exchange accommodation titleholder holds either the relinquished or replacement property while the taxpayer completes the exchange within the applicable time limits. The taxpayer has 45 days (after obtaining title to the replacement property) to identify the relinquished property that will be sold. The sale of the relinquished property must close within 180 days from the purchase of the replacement property.

The taxpayer cannot hold direct title of both properties during the reverse 1031 exchange process. Either the relinquished property or the replacement property must have its title held by a Qualified Intermediary throughout the exchange process.

The first option is for the taxpayer to transfer title of the relinquished property to a Qualified Intermediary at the start of the process; the Intermediary holds title to the replacement property throughout the process, until it is sold. The taxpayer can immediately take title to the replacement property when purchased.

Alternatively, when the replacement property is purchased, title is immediately taken by the Qualified Intermediary, who holds title throughout the process. After the taxpayer sells the relinquished property, the intermediary will transfer title of the replacement property to the taxpayer.

== Hypothetical examples of a 1031 exchange ==
An investor buys a commercial property for $200,000 (his cost basis). After six years, he could sell the property for $250,000. This would result in a gain of $50,000, on which the investor would typically have to pay three types of taxes: a federal capital gains tax, a state capital gains tax and a depreciation recapture tax based on the depreciation taken by the investor on the property since purchase. If the investor invests the proceeds from the $250,000 sale into another property or properties (without touching the proceeds and using a Qualified Intermediary), then he would not have to pay any taxes on the gain at that time.

An owner of a detached house on 3 acres (12,000 m^{2}) is transferred by his employer to another state. Rather than selling the house, which will no longer be his personal residence, he rents it out for a period of time. After ten years, he decides to sell it but, at the same time, he has a grown son who will be going to college in yet another state. He decides that he wants to buy an apartment building in the college town for the son and other students to rent. His house has appreciated from $200,000 to $300,000. Therefore, he arranges for a section 1031 exchange, and buys the new property, thus avoiding the capital gains tax at that time.

In this example, the investor would need to substantiate his or her investment intent to the IRS by showing an arm's-length lease to the son and other students. The investor should declare income and related depreciation deductions.

In addition to the sale of real estate, selling an interest in real property such as an easement may also qualify for a 1031 exchange.

== See also ==
- Real estate transfer tax
- Tenants in common 1031 exchange
