= Richard T. Williamson =

American non-fiction writer (born 1958)

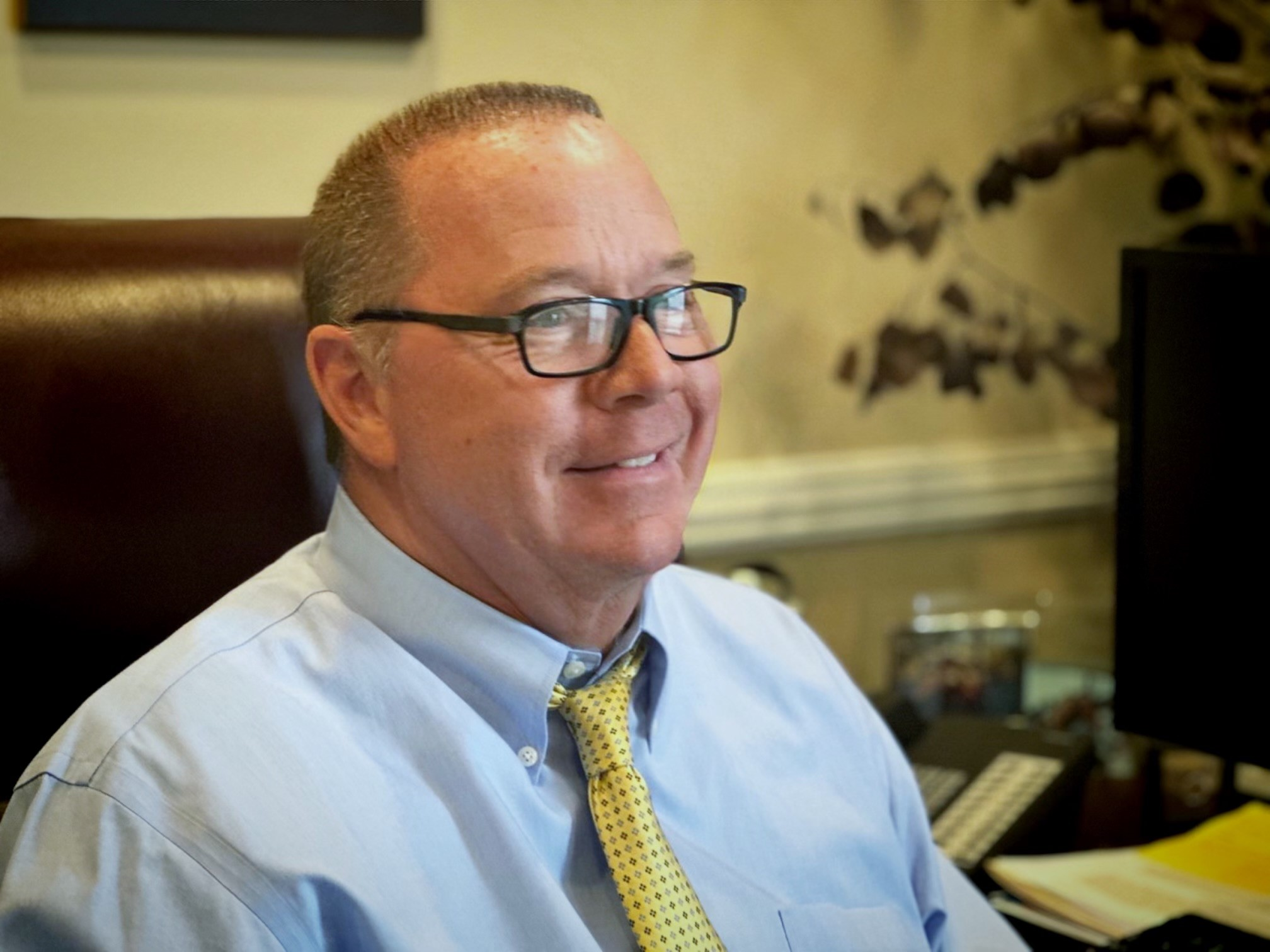
- Richard T. Williamson, Esq
- Born: Richard Thomas Williamson; 1958 (age 67–68)
- Education: University of Southern California (BS); Southwestern Law School (JD)
- Occupations: lawyer, writer

Richard Thomas Williamson (born 1958) is an American non-fiction writer who has written books and articles on asset protection, estate planning, and capital gains tax planning. He is a California attorney specializing in estate planning and forming business entities such as corporations and limited liability companies (LLCs). His books are designed to approach tax strategies and asset protection from a real estate investor's perspective.

In capital gains tax planning, Richard T. Williamson is considered one of the early experts contributing to the understanding and use of the tax deferral strategy known as the private annuity trust. After his initial book on the subject in 2003, private annuity trusts became popular with financial and real estate advisors. Specialized companies sprang up across the US marketing private annuity trusts to the general public sometimes misrepresenting the benefits or applying the strategy inappropriately. The growing popularity and perceived abuse of private annuity trusts drew the attention and scrutiny of the Internal Revenue Service and on October 18, 2006, the IRS issued a Notice of Proposed Rulemaking that basically eliminated any tax deferral benefits of private annuity trusts created after that date.

Richard's expertise in capital gains tax planning and real estate investing has been noted and called upon by The Wall Street Journal on three occasions as well as by the JT Foxx Radio Show. Additionally, he has had his work featured in Investment Adviser Magazine.

Richard earned his Bachelor of Science in Business Administration from the University of Southern California and his Juris Doctor from Southwestern University School of Law.

He currently resides and has his law practice in Long Beach, California.

== Bibliography ==
- Selling Real Estate Without Paying Taxes: A Guide to Capital Gains Tax Alternatives (1st Ed. 2003, ISBN 978-0-7931-6798-2)
- Tax Secrets of Millionaire Real Estate Investors (2005, ISBN 0-7931-9362-1)
- Selling Real Estate Without Paying Taxes: A Guide to Capital Gains Tax Alternatives (2nd Ed. 2007, ISBN 978-1-4195-8437-4)
- The Real Estate Investors Guide to Corporations, LLCs, and Asset Protection Entities (2008, ISBN 978-1-4277-9702-5)
