= Taxation in Hungary =

Taxation in Hungary (2017), Source: Deloitte.
Corporate income tax rate	9%
Branch tax rate	9%
Minimum tax	Applied to 2% of adjusted gross profit
Capital gains tax rate	9%
Tax basis	Worldwide income
Participation exemption	Yes
Loss relief	Carryforward: Indefinite, but limitations apply Carryback: Generally not available
Double taxation relief	Yes
Tax consolidation	For VAT purposes
Transfer pricing rules	Yes
Thin capitalization rules	Yes (ratio 3:1)
Controlled foreign corp. rules	Yes
Tax year	Calendar year, but different fiscal year may be elected
Advance payment of tax	Monthly/quarterly
Return due date	Last day of the fifth month following of the end of the fiscal year
Withholding tax	Dividends: 0% Interest: 0% Royalties: 0% Branch remittance tax: 0%
Social security contributions	13% of gross wages for the employer (from 2022)
Capital tax	No
Building tax/land tax	May apply at municipal level
Real estate transfer tax	4% up to a value of HUF 1bn (€3.3 million) and 2% on the excess, capped at HUF 200 million (€0.65 million)
Local business tax	maximum 2% of net sales revenue
Innovation contribution	0.3%
Financial transaction tax	0.3% of transferred amount maximum HUF 6000 (€20)
VAT	27% (standard), 18%, 5%
Hungary quick tax facts for Individuals (2017), Source: Deloitte.
Income tax rate	15%
Capital gains tax rate	15%
Tax basis	Worldwide income
Double taxation relief	Yes
Tax year	Calendar year
Return due date	20 May (Tax authority prepares it electronically to everyone automatically)
Withholding tax	Dividends: 15% Interest: 15% Royalties: 15%
Healthcare contribution	14% or 22% on some income maximum annual HUF 450 000 (€1460)
Social security contributions	18.5% of gross wages for the employee
Net wealth tax	No
Inheritance and gift tax	9% or 18%
Real estate tax	May apply at municipal level
VAT	27% (standard), 18%, 5%

Taxation in Hungary is levied by both national and local governments. Tax revenue in Hungary stood at 38.4% of GDP in 2017. The most important revenue sources include the income tax, Social security, corporate tax and the value added tax, which are all applied at the national level. Among the total tax income the ratio of local taxes is solely 5% while the EU average is 30%.

Income tax in Hungary is levied at a flat rate of 15%. Additionally there are two others contributions levied on income, a "social security contribution" of 18.5% (that is deducted from the gross salary) and an "employer's tax" of 13% (which is not part of employee's wage, but paid by the employer). Thus the effective income tax is a flat rate of 46.5%. A tax allowance is given through a family allowance (Hungarian: családi adókedvezmény), which is equal to the allowance multiplied by the number of "beneficiary dependent children". For one or two children the allowance is HUF 62,500 per child, for three or more HUF 206,250 per child. The allowance can be split between spouses or life partners.

In 2025, young people will be exempt from personal income tax until the age of 25, which can mean an annual maximum of HUF 1,146,000 in income tax contributions. The same relief applies to mothers under 30. Mothers who have raised or are raising at least four children and have been entitled to family allowances for a minimum of 12 years will benefit from a lifetime exemption. On 22 February 2025, the government announced that mothers with two or three children would receive a full lifetime income tax exemption.

The standard rate of value added tax is 27% as of January 2012 — the highest in the European Union. There is a reduced rate of 5% for most medicines and some food products, and a reduced rate of 18% for internet connections, restaurants and catering, dairy and bakery products, hotel services and admission to short-term open-air events.

In January 2017, corporate tax was unified at a rate of 9% — the lowest in the European Union. Dividends received are not subject to taxation, provided that are not received from a Controlled Foreign Company (CFC). Capital gains are included in corporate tax, with certain exemptions.

Capital gains are taxed at a flat rate of 15%.

EU VAT tax rates

== History ==
After the Ottoman conquest of central parts of Hungary, the most common tax was the Ottoman administration's levy on Christians the dhimmi. Under Austro-Hungarian rule, taxes were mostly levied by Austria, but Hungary was later given more financial autonomy in the Austro-Hungarian Compromise of 1867. In 1988, liberalization of the Soviet-influenced Kádár government introduced tax reform, establishing a comprehensive tax system of central and local taxes, consisting mainly of a personal income tax, a corporate income tax and a value added tax.
