= Multinational corporation =

Corporation operating in multiple countries

A multinational corporation (MNC) is a corporate organization that owns and controls the production or trade of goods or services in at least one country other than its home country. Control is considered an important aspect of an MNC to distinguish it from international portfolio investment organizations, such as some international mutual funds that invest in corporations abroad to diversify financial risks. A MNC may also be called a multinational enterprise (MNE), transnational enterprise (TNE), transnational corporation (TNC), international corporation, or stateless corporation.

Currently, most of the largest and most influential companies are publicly traded multinational corporations, including Forbes Global 2000 companies.

== Description ==
A multinational corporation (MNC) is a corporation incorporated in one country that produces or sells goods or services in various countries. Two common characteristics shared by MNCs are their large size and centrally controlled worldwide activities, which can include:

- Importing and exporting goods and services
- Making significant investments in a foreign country
- Buying and selling licenses in foreign markets
- Engaging in contract manufacturing—permitting a local manufacturer in a foreign country to produce its products
- Opening manufacturing facilities or assembly operations in foreign countries

Multinational enterprise (MNE) is the preferred term used by international economists and is defined as an enterprise that controls and manages production establishments, known as plants, located in at least two countries. The MNE engages in foreign direct investment (FDI) as it makes direct investments in host country plants for equity ownership and managerial control, to avoid some transaction costs.

Stateless corporation is a term used for MNCs which are broadly active across the world without a concentration in one state (these have also been called "transnational corporations" though this term is also used synonymously with MNC). As of 1992, a corporation must be legally domiciled in a particular country and engage in other countries through foreign direct investment and the creation of foreign subsidiaries. Geographic diversification can be measured across various domains, including ownership and control, workforce, sales, and regulation and taxation.

MNCs may gain from their global presence in a variety of ways. MNCs can benefit from the economy of scale by spreading R&D expenditures and advertising costs over their global sales, pooling global purchasing power over suppliers, and utilizing their technological and managerial experience globally with minimal additional costs. Furthermore, MNCs can use their global presence to take advantage of underpriced labor services often found in developing countries while gaining access to special R&D capabilities residing in advanced countries.

The problem of moral and legal constraints upon the behavior of multinational corporations, given that they are effectively "stateless" actors, is one of several urgent global socioeconomic problems that have emerged during the late twentieth century.

=== Alternatives and arrangements ===
For small corporations, registering a foreign subsidiary can be expensive and complex, involving fees, signatures, and forms; a professional employer organization (PEO) is sometimes advised as a cheaper and simpler alternative, but not all jurisdictions have laws accepting these types of arrangements.

== Economic theory ==
The actions of multinational corporations are strongly supported by economic liberalism ideology of free market systems in a globalized international society. According to the economic realist view, individuals act in rational ways to maximize their self-interest which creates markets, and that these function most efficiently in a free market system where there is little government interference. This advocates the free exchange of goods and services to maximize international wealth.

To many economic liberals, MNCs are the vanguard of the liberal order. They are seen as an embodiment of the liberal model of an interdependent world economy, taking the integration of national economies beyond trade and money to the internationalization of production. In this view, production, marketing, and investment are being organized on a global scale rather than in terms of nationally bounded economies.

Academic research has been carried out in the specialist field of international business, producing economic theories of MNCs including internalization theory and the eclectic paradigm (a.k.a. the OLI framework).

Another theoretical dimension of the role of MNCs concerns the relationship between the globalization of economic engagement and the culture of national and local responses. This has a history of self-conscious cultural management dating from the 1960s. For example, psychiatrist and marketing expert Ernest Dichter, writing in Harvard Business Review in 1963, observed that companies with "foresight to capitalize on international opportunities" must recognize that "cultural anthropology will be an important tool for competitive marketing". This involved manipulating attachments to a consumer's nation in order to internationalize the nation and facilitate a global corporate village inhabited by "world customers".

The concept of stateless corporations arose in the 1990s. A theory suggested that such entities could be empirically defined "with analytical tools at the intersection between demographic analysis and transportation research". This intersection is known as logistics management, and describes the importance of rapidly increasing global mobility of resources. For a quarter-century, stateless corporations have procured source materials on a worldwide basis to produce and customize products for markets in individual countries.

== History ==
=== Colonialism ===
The first multinational corporations are tied to the history of colonialism, and were founded to establish colonial "factories" or port cities. The two main examples are the British East India Company, founded in 1600, and the Dutch East India Company (VOC), founded in 1602. In addition to conducting trade between Great Britain and its colonies, the British East India Company became a quasi-government in its own right, with local government officials and its own army in India. Other examples include the Swedish Africa Company, founded in 1649, and the Hudson's Bay Company (HBC), founded in 1670. These early corporations engaged in international trade and exploration and set up trading posts.

The Dutch government took over the VOC in 1799, and through the 1800s other governments increasingly took over private companies, most notably in British India. HBC, while losing its trade and land monopoly in 1870, maintained its trading posts as general goods stores for settlers, evolving into a chain of modern department stores which continued until 2025. During the process of decolonization, the European colonial charter companies were disbanded, with the final colonial corporation, the Mozambique Company, dissolving in 1972.

=== Mining ===
Mining of gold, silver, and copper was a major activity in the colonial period and remains so today. International mining companies became prominent in Britain in the 19th century, such as the Rio Tinto company, founded in 1873 to purchase sulphur and copper mines from the Spanish government. The corporation made many acquisitions and expanded globally to mine aluminum, iron, copper, uranium, and diamonds. European mines in South Africa began operations in the late 19th century, producing gold and other minerals for the world market. Cecil Rhodes (1853–1902) was one of the few businessmen in the era who became Prime Minister (of South Africa 1890–1896). His mining enterprises included the British South Africa Company and De Beers. The latter company practically controlled the global diamond market from its base in southern Africa.

=== Oil ===
By the 1930s, seven MNCs dominated global oil production, owning nearly all rights to the oil in Iran, Iraq, Saudi Arabia, and the Persian Gulf. These MNCs became known as Consortium for Iran cartel or the "Seven Sisters". They shared control of the major oil fields and colluded, adjusting oil production in order to keep prices high while simultaneously forcing the countries they operated in to compete against each other for lower tax rates and oil royalties. In the 1970s, nationalized oil companies took over production, with the OPEC cartel gaining market dominance, though oil MNCs continued to be profitable. In the late 1990s and early 2000s, there were numerous mergers in the global energy sector, resulting in the "super-major" integrated oil companies or Big Oil. These MNCs are among the largest and most-profitable companies.

=== Manufacturing ===
During the 1930s, about 80% of international investment by MNCs were in resource extraction (especially oil) and agriculture (rubber, tobacco, sugar, palm oil, coffee, cocoa, and tropical fruit), mostly in colonies. This changed during the rebuilding processes following WWII, as opportunity arose for MNCs to establish manufacturing in industrialized countries, particularly in the transportation, vehicle, chemical, pharmaceutical, and electronics sectors.

Studies of host economies have also emphasized that the impact of multinational enterprises varied by national context; research on Australia, for example, has examined how foreign MNCs arrived in successive waves and interacted with local sectors, government policy, and resource-based development.

Sweden's leading manufacturing concern was SKF, a leading maker of bearings for machinery. In order to expand its international business, it decided in 1966 that it needed to use the English language. Senior officials, although mostly still Swedish, all learned English, and all major internal documents were in English, the lingua franca of multinational corporations.

=== Proliferation ===
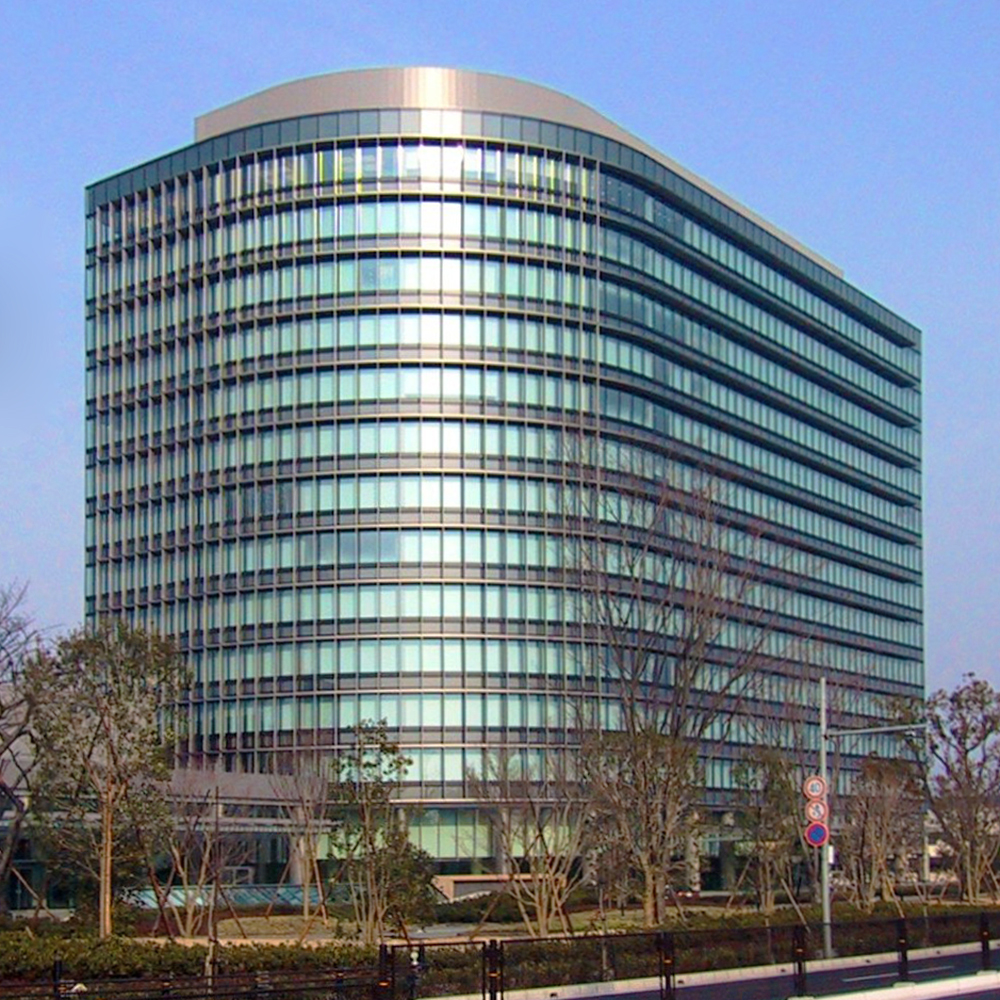
Toyota is one of the world's largest multinational corporations, with its headquarters in Toyota City, Japan.

The number of businesses having at least one foreign country operation rose from a few thousand before WWII to 78,411 in 2007. The rise in the number of MNCs could be due to a stable political environment that encourages cooperation, advances in technology that enable management of faraway regions, and favorable organizational development that encourages business expansion into other countries. Three-quarters of MNCs are headquartered in economically advanced countries. Developing and former communist countries such as China, India, and Brazil are the largest recipients of MNC investment. However, 70% of foreign direct investment went into developed countries in the form of stocks and cash flows.

== Foreign direct investment ==
When a corporation invests in a country in which it is not domiciled, this is called foreign direct investment (FDI). Countries may place restrictions on direct investment; for example, China has historically required partnerships with local firms or special approval for certain types of investments by foreigners, although some of these restrictions were eased in 2019. Similarly, the Committee on Foreign Investment in the United States reviews foreign investments in that country.

In addition, corporations may be prohibited from various business transactions by international sanctions or domestic laws. For example, Chinese citizens and domestic corporations have limitations on their ability to make foreign investments, in part to reduce capital outflow. Countries have imposed extraterritorial sanctions on foreign corporations for doing business with certain countries or corporations, which occurred with the 2019 US sanctions against Iran; European companies were faced with the possibility of losing access to the US market if they traded with Iran.

International investment agreements can facilitate direct investment between two countries, such as the North American Free Trade Agreement (1994–2020) and most favored nation status.

== Legal domicile ==
Multinationals can select from a variety of jurisdictions for various subsidiaries, but the ultimate parent company can select a single legal domicile. In 2014, The Economist suggested that the Netherlands has become a popular choice, as its company laws have fewer requirements for meetings, compensation, and audit committees, and that Great Britain had advantages due to laws on withholding dividends and a double-taxation treaty with the United States. Economist Raymond Vernon reported in 1977 that of the 455 largest manufacturing MNCs, 250 were headquartered in the US, 115 in Western Europe, 70 in Japan, and 20 in the rest of the world. Of the 45 largest banking MNCs, 20 were headquartered in the US, 13 in Europe, 9 in Japan, and 3 in Canada.

== Regulation and taxation ==
Corporations can legally engage in tax avoidance through their choice of domiciled jurisdiction, though they may be accused of breaching tax evasion laws. Multinational corporations may be subject to the laws and regulations of both their domicile and the additional jurisdictions where they are engaged in business. In some cases, the jurisdiction can help to avoid burdensome laws, but regulatory statutes often target the "enterprise" with statutory language around "control".

As of 1992, most OECD countries lack the legal authority to tax a domiciled parent corporation on its worldwide revenue, including its subsidiaries. As of 2019, the US applies its corporate taxation "extraterritorially", which has motivated tax inversions to change the domiciled state. By 2019, most OECD nations, with the notable exception of the US, had moved to territorial tax in which only revenue inside the border was taxed; however, these nations typically scrutinize foreign income with controlled foreign corporation (CFC) rules to avoid base erosion and profit shifting.

In practice, even under an extraterritorial system, taxes may be deferred until remittance, with possible repatriation tax holidays, and subject to foreign tax credits. Countries generally cannot tax the worldwide revenue of a foreign subsidiary, and taxation is complicated by transfer pricing arrangements with parent corporations.

Disputes between corporations in different nations are often handled through international arbitration.

== Criticism and debate ==
Economist Sanjaya Lall in 1974 proposed a spectrum of scholarly analysis of multinational corporations, from the political right to the left. He put the business school how-to-do-it writers at the extreme right, followed by the liberal laissez-faire economists, and the neoliberals (they remain right of center but do allow for occasional mistakes of the marketplace, such as externalities). Moving to the left side of the line are nationalists, who prioritize national interests over corporate profits, then the "dependencia" school in Latin America that focuses on the evils of imperialism, and on the far left, the Marxists. The range is so broad that scholarly consensus is difficult to discern. Recent historical scholarship has examined multinational corporations not only as economic organizations, but also as institutions with social, political, environmental, and cultural effects across different national settings.

Anti-corporate advocates criticize MNCs for being without a basis in a national ethos, which appears in their practice of doing business with countries that have low human rights or environmental standards. The aggressive use of tax avoidance schemes and multinational tax havens allows MNCs to gain competitive advantages over small and medium-sized enterprises. Organizations such as the Tax Justice Network criticize governments for allowing MNCs to escape taxation, particularly by using base erosion and profit shifting (BEPS) tax tools, since less money can be spent for public services. Moreover, academics found that profit shifting by multinational corporations led to a reduction in domestic profit in much of the world, with the European Union losing upwards of 20% while developing countries lost up to 5% due to billions being transferred to corporate tax havens. While research has found that anti-transfer pricing may be effective in raising corporate revenue, many advocates continue to argue that more needs to be done since profit shifting, coupled with other methods such as export-processing zones, reduces government revenue for services that support lower and middle-class citizens, increases income and profits for high income shareholders, and reduce after-tax income for workers.

According to Crotty, Epstein, and Kelly (1998), the mobility of multinational corporations within a neoliberal policy regime increases their bargaining power vis-à-vis labor and governments, which can lead to a "race to the bottom" in taxes, regulation, and wages. Through threat and spillover effects, this may contribute to greater inequality, persistent unemployment, and wage stagnation. However, the authors emphasize that the effects of foreign direct investment are context-dependent. When investments take place in an environment with high aggregate demand, strong institutions, and clear rules that limit coercive competition, and effective coordination among governments, multinationals may instead contribute to higher wages, improved working conditions, and broader economic development.

Economist Paul Krugman argued in his essay "In Praise of Cheap Labor" (1997) that the jobs created by multinational corporations in developing countries, despite low wages and poor working conditions, are often an improvement compared to the available alternatives such as marginal farming or the informal economy. He maintained that "bad jobs at bad wages" are better than no jobs at all, since factory work in export-oriented sectors can serve as a stepping stone to broader economic development. According to Krugman, countries such as South Korea, Taiwan, Indonesia, and Bangladesh have achieved measurable progress in income, nutrition, and living standards through export-led industrialization. Although multinationals are primarily driven by profit, Krugman argued that the main beneficiaries are not capital owners but workers in developing countries.

== See also ==
- Financial risk management § Corporate finance
- Globalization
- Global workforce
- List of multinational corporations
- Transnational Corporations Observatory
- World economy
- Multinational tax haven
