= Delaware statutory trust =

American business structure

A Delaware statutory trust (DST) is a legally recognized trust that is set up for the purpose of business, but not necessarily in the U.S. state of Delaware. It may also be referred to as an Unincorporated Business Trust or UBO.

Delaware statutory trusts are formed as private governing agreements under which either (1) property (real, tangible and intangible) is held, managed, administered, invested and/or operated; or (2) business or professional activities for profit are carried on by one or more trustees for the benefit of the trustor entitled to a beneficial interest in the trust property.

DST Investments are offered as replacement property for accredited investors seeking to defer their capital gains taxes through the use of a 1031 tax deferred exchange and as straight cash investments for those wishing to diversify their real estate holdings. The DST property ownership structure allows the smaller investor to own a fractional interest in large, institutional quality and professionally managed commercial property along with other investors, not as limited partners, but as individual owners within a Trust. Each owner receives their percentage share of the cash flow income, tax benefits, and appreciation, if any, of the entire property. DSTs provide the investor the potential for annual appreciation and depreciation (tax shelter), and most have minimum investments as low as $100,000, allowing some investors the benefit of diversification into several properties.

The DST ownership option essentially offers the same benefits and risks that an investor would receive as a single large-scale investment property owner, but without the management responsibility. Each DST property asset is managed by professional investment real estate asset managers and property managers. It used to be that only large institutional investors such as life insurance companies, pension funds, real estate investment trusts (REITS), college endowments and foundations were able to invest in these properties. Now as a viable 1031 exchange replacement property option through a DST, individual investors have the ability to invest in a diversified selection of institutional quality, investment property types that they otherwise could not purchase individually. DST Investments are located throughout the United States. Property types may include multifamily apartment communities, office buildings, industrial properties, multi-tenant retail, student housing, assisted living, self-storage facilities, medical office, single tenant retail properties and others .

== History ==
The concept for business trusts, especially those that involve the holding of property, dates back to 16th century English Common Law. In Delaware, it was not until 1947 that Common Law began recognizing statutory trusts. No legal recognition of statutory trusts existed until the passage of the Delaware Statutory Trust Act (DSTA), 12 Del. C. 3801 et. Seq., in 1988. Under The Act, developed on the premise of trust law, statutory trusts were now recognized as their own legal entity, separate from their trustee(s), offering freedom from the corporate law template. Within the tradition of trust law, freedom of contract allows the trustee(s) to structure their entity in a way that is most beneficial to the relationship of all parties and their expertise, while offering liability protection similar to that of a Limited liability company or Partnership. Since the year 2000, Delaware statutory trusts have increasingly been used as a form of tax deferral, asset protection, and balance sheet advantages in real estate, securitization, mezzanine financing, real estate investment trusts (REITs), and mutual funds. Massachusetts, another state that has trust law, refers to its legal entity as a Massachusetts business trust. Most states, however, still rely on Common Law to oversee the trusts within their jurisdiction.

== Formation requirements ==
Delaware Certificate of Statutory Trust form & official State Seal.

The formation of a Delaware statutory trust is relatively simple and inexpensive, when compared to that of the more complex filings of other entity types. To form a statutory trust, a private trust agreement must be developed by all involved parties to ensure that individual interests are protected. The private trust agreement need not be shown to any official of the State. Once the agreement is completed, a Certificate of Trust can be obtained from the Delaware Division of Corporations and completed. The signatures of the trustee(s) involved are then required, followed by submission of the forms to the Division of Corporations, along with a one-time $500 processing fee. If the statutory trust is, or will become, a registered investment company, it must maintain a registered agent and a registered office within the State of Delaware. If no desire for the statutory trust to be an investment company exists, the only remaining requirement is that it must have at least one trustee who resides in, or has a principal place of business within the State of Delaware.

== Legal and tax implications ==
=== Federal/1031 Exchange ===
On August 16, 2004, Internal Revenue Bulletin 2004-33 was published in reference to Rev. Rul. 2004-86. This involved a Delaware Statutory Trust that came before the Internal Revenue Service (IRS) and Treasury Department, who offered a ruling on the following two issues:

1. "[H]ow is a Delaware statutory trust, described in Del. Code Ann. title 12, §§ 3801 - 3824, classified for federal tax purposes?"
  "The Delaware statutory trust described above is an investment trust, under § 301.7701-4(c), that will be classified as a trust for federal tax purposes."
2. "[M]ay a taxpayer exchange real property for an interest in a Delaware statutory trust without recognition of gain or loss under § 1031 of the Internal Revenue Code?"
  "A taxpayer may exchange real property for an interest in the Delaware statutory trust described above without recognition of gain or loss under § 1031, if the other requirements of § 1031 are satisfied."

These holdings of the federal government offered a clearer notion that Delaware statutory trusts are legal entities, separate from their trustee(s), offering them limited liability. In addition, Delaware statutory trusts were shown to be considered a trust for federal tax purposes, making them a pass through entity that mitigates taxation for their trustee(s). The second holding offers the opinion that real property, being held under a Delaware statutory trust, is eligible to use a 1031 exchange, without the recognition of gain or loss, as long as the following seven restrictions are met:

1. Once the offering is closed, there can be no future contributions to the DST by either current or new beneficiaries.
2. The trustee cannot renegotiate the terms of the existing loans and cannot borrow any new funds from any party, unless a loan default exists as a result of a tenant bankruptcy or insolvency.
3. The trustee cannot reinvest the proceeds from the sale of its real estate.
4. The trustee is limited to making capital expenditures with respect to the property for normal repair and maintenance, minor nonstructural capital improvements, and those required by law.
5. Any reserves or cash held between distribution dates can only be invested in short-term debt obligations.
6. All cash, other than necessary reserves, must be distributed on a current basis.
7. The trustee cannot enter into new leases, or renegotiate the current leases unless there is a need due to a tenant bankruptcy or insolvency.

=== Local ===
As an entity that was created within the boundaries of Delaware and is written into the Delaware state charter, Title 12 Chapter 38, there is no question as to where the state stands on the backing of the Delaware statutory trust. Limited liability is offered for DSTs, affording each trustee the benefit of personal asset protection. DSTs can be structured as a pass through entity, so that any income will go straight to each individual trustee's Form 1040 and state's tax returns, thus avoiding income tax at the entity level.

Features of a Delaware statutory trust are very attractive to many business entities. These features include:

- liability protection for the trustee(s) (e.g. liens, bond obligations)
- asset protection for the beneficial owner (or vice versa: a creditor of a DST beneficial owner cannot take legal action against the DST's property)
- separate legal entity
- delegation of management
- low minimum investment requirements
- cash investors may complete a 1031 exchange upon sale
- one-time registration
- no need for annual meetings
- no franchise tax
- no limit on the number of investors
- availability of indemnification
- recognition of separate series
- ease of obtaining leases, loans, and corporate bonds and notes (as part of real estate investment trusts, etc.)
