= Alderson v. Commissioner =

- Court: United States Court of Appeals for the Ninth Circuit
- Full case name: James Alderson (Surviving Husband & Executor) & Estate of Clarissa E. Alderson, Deceased, vs. Commissioner of Internal Revenue
- Decided: May 22, 1963
- Citations: 317 F.2d 790; 11 A.F.T.R.2d 1529; 63-2 USTC (CCH) ¶ 9499

Case history
- Prior history: 38 T.C. 215 (1962)

Holding
- The exchange of property constitutes a taxable exchange; reversal of Tax Court ruling

Court membership
- Judges sitting: Stanley Barnes, Charles Merton Merrill, Elisha Avery Crary (District)

Case opinions
- Majority: Crary, joined by a unanimous court

Laws applied
- 26 U.S.C. § 1031; 26 U.S.C. § 1002

Keywords
- Like-kind exchange

Alderson v. Commissioner, 317 F.2d 790 (9th Cir. 1963) was a tax law case in which the United States Court of Appeals for the Ninth Circuit reversed the ruling of the United States Tax Court that an exchange of properties does not constitute a taxable sale under § 1031(a) of the Internal Revenue Code.

== Facts ==
The petitioners of the case, comprising James Alderson and the estate of his wife Clarissa ("Alderson"), owned a property entitled “Buena Park”. They formed a deal with Alloy Die Casting Company (“Alloy”) in which they intended to sell the property to the company. Shortly thereafter, the petitioners discovered a different property (“Salinas”) which they wanted to obtain in exchange for Buena Park. They arranged a deal with Alloy whereby Alloy would purchase Salinas and then exchange it for Buena Park. The petitioners would then give Alloy any discrepancy in the form of cash. The deal further stipulated that if Alloy could not acquire the property by September 11, 1957, the petitioners would sell Buena Park to them and then purchase Salinas themselves. Eventually, Alloy did purchase Salinas and the properties were exchanged.

== Tax Court ruling ==
The tax court held that the disposal of Buena Park and acquisition of Salinas did not constitute an exchange under § 1031(a) of the Internal Revenue Code. The court reasoned that the petitioners intended from the outset to exchange their property for another of a like kind and that Alloy acquired the title to the Salinas property for the sole purpose of an exchange of it for Buena Park. The court concluded that Buena Park was sold to Alloy and that the petitioners had purchased the Salinas property due to their escrow arrangement. Thus, the tax court ruled that the motives of the petitioners indicated a sale and not an exchange.

== Issue ==
The issue before the Court of Appeals was whether the transaction between Alloy and Alderson constituted a sale of the Buena Park property and then a subsequent purchase of the Salinas property, or a like-kind exchange under I.R.C. § 1031.

== Appellate court holding ==
The Court of Appeals held that the property transaction between Alloy and Alderson had been a like-kind exchange subject to § 1031 treatment. The holding of the tax court was thereby reversed.

== Reasoning ==
The court held that because the properties had indeed been exchanged, they are subject to nonrecognition of gain under § 1031. In the holding, the court first referenced the case of Commissioner v. Court Holding Co. From there, the court determined that, for tax purposes, the incidence taxation depends upon the substance of a transaction. It was held that any tax consequences arising from gains from property sale are not to be ultimately determined solely by the means employed to transfer legal title. Rather, the court determined, such transaction must be viewed as a whole, and each step, from the commencement of negotiations to the consummation of the sale, is relevant.

The substantive transaction concerning the court was an exchange of like-kind properties between Alloy and Alderson. The deeds were exchanged September 3 or 4, 1957, prior to when the petitioners would have sold Buena Park. The sale arrangement never came to fruition.

The Commissioner referenced the case Gregory v. Helvering where the court had held that “the question for determination is whether what was done, apart from the tax motive, was the thing which the statute intended.” The statute intends that only like-kind properties that are exchanged receive any favorable treatment under § 1031. It was held that the intentions of both parties provided motives in accord with the statute.

The court also referenced the holding from the case Mercantile Trust Company of Baltimore v. Commissioner. In that case, a similar transaction had occurred wherein the petitioner had wanted to exchange a property for one that had yet to be purchased by the other party. The deal had provided that if the other party could not acquire the desired property by a certain date, the petitioner would sell his property, in a very similar fashion to the deal between Alloy and Alderson. The other property had been acquired and an exchange occurred. The court held that “the above-mentioned agreement … evidenced an intention to exchange the … property, if certain conditions were met, and to sell it, if those conditions were not met. The property was … exchanged. That fact is controlling here.”

== Significance ==
The holding of the court maintained that so long as an exchange of properties meets all the like-kind requirements, it does not matter whether one of the properties was purchased solely for exchange purposes.

== See also ==
- Jordan Marsh Co. v. Commissioner
