= Like-kind exchange =

Transactions under U.S. tax law

A like-kind exchange under United States tax law, also known as a 1031 exchange, is a transaction or series of transactions that allows for the disposal of an asset and the acquisition of another replacement asset without generating a current tax liability from the sale of the first asset. A like-kind exchange can involve the exchange of one business for another business, one real estate investment property for another real estate investment property, livestock for qualifying livestock, and exchanges of other qualifying assets. Like-kind exchanges have been characterized as tax breaks or "tax loopholes".

== U.S. Tax Code section 1031 ==
This kind of transaction is also called a "1031 exchange", because Internal Revenue Code section 1031 of the U.S. Internal Revenue Code allows owners of certain kinds of assets to defer capital gains taxes on any exchange of like-kind properties. Both the relinquished property and the acquired property must be like-kind, and must be held for business or investment purposes. The sum of assets of each side of the exchange must be equal in value. Taxes on capital gains are not charged upon sale of a property if a qualifying replacement property is acquired. The transaction has to be properly structured, including that the taxpayer cannot be deemed to have actually or constructively received the sales price of the relinquished property. To avoid "constructive receipt" of the sales proceeds, a neutral party is often used to maintain the sales proceeds out of the reach of the taxpayer. The replacement property generally must be "identified" within 45 days of when the original property is transferred, and must be "acquired" within 180 days of when the original property is transferred. If the transaction is handled properly, the payment of tax is deferred until the replacement property is later sold with no reinvestment in a qualifying property.

The idea behind this section of the tax code is that when an individual or a business sells a property to buy another, no economic gain has been achieved. There has simply been a transfer from one property to another. For example, if a real estate investor sells an apartment building to buy another one, he or she will not be charged tax on any gains he or she made on the original apartment building. When the investor sells the original apartment building and purchases a new one, the value used from the original to buy the new one has not changed – the only thing that has changed is where the value resides.

=== Non-recognition provision ===
A like-kind exchange is a type of "non-recognition provision". According to section 1001(c) of the Internal Revenue Code, all realized gains and losses must be recognized "except as otherwise provided in this subtitle". A like-kind exchange is one of the qualified exceptions, serving as the proto-typical "non-recognition provision".

Non-recognition is conferred on a like-kind exchange on the basis that the form of the taxpayer's investment changes while the substance of the investment does not. In a like-kind exchange, the realized gain or loss usually never disappears; rather, the unrecognized gain or loss typically carries over into the new asset. When the new asset is sold or exchanged in a taxable transaction, the realized gain or loss from the first transaction will then be recognized.

== Key considerations ==
Several requirements must be met in a like-kind exchange to ensure that tax liability is not created upon the sale of the first asset:

1. The property or asset being sold ("old property") must be held for investment or use in a trade or business, and cannot be a personal residence.
2. The property or asset being purchased with the proceeds ("new property") must be "like-kind" to the old property.
3. The proceeds from the sale must be used to purchase the new property within 180 days of the sale of old property, although the new property must be identified within 45 days of the sale.
4. The investor cannot be in "constructive receipt" of the money from the sale of the old property.

== What is property of "like kind"? ==
One critical issue in a like-kind exchange is defining "property of like kind." The tax code contains no such definition. Treasury Regulation § 1.1031(a)-1(b) offers a little guidance, suggesting that the term "like kind" refers to "the nature of character of the property and not to its grade or quality". But the regulation does not further define a property's nature, character, grade or quality. Rather, it states that "[o]ne kind or class of property may not be exchanged for property of a different kind or class".

Exchanges of personal property (vehicles, equipment, intellectual property rights) are subject to more restrictive rules than exchanges of real property, as set forth by Treasury Regulation § 1.1031(a)-2. Depreciable personal property is generally considered like-kind to other depreciable personal property that has the same "General Asset Class" in assigning class lives for purposes of depreciation. For intangible property (and personal property not subject to depreciation), the more general test of "nature or character" applies. While livestock can qualify for like-kind exchange treatment, livestock of different sexes will not qualify as like-kind.

Seven types of property are not eligible for a like-kind exchange: (1) stock in trade or other property held primarily for sale; (2) stock, bonds, or notes; (3) other securities or evidences of indebtedness or interest; (4) interests in a partnership; (5) certificates of trust or beneficial interests; (6) choses in action; and (7) foreign real property for U.S. real property.

== Basis of property acquired ==
The unrecognized gain or unrecognized loss from a like-kind exchange is preserved in the new property received in the exchange. New property receives the basis of the old property, adjusted in value for any other property given or received in the exchange (see below for further discussion of "boot").

The taxpayer's basis in the new property is determined by starting with the taxpayer's basis in the old property exchanged. Adjustments are then made as needed to account for other property that may be received in the exchange. By using the taxpayer's basis in the old property as the reference point for the new property's basis, unrecognized gain or loss is preserved.

By way of example, let's say a taxpayer exchanges an old asset worth $20,000 in which the taxpayer had a basis of $14,000 for a like-kind asset. Assuming the exchange qualifies for non-recognition (based on how the taxpayer held the old property and how the taxpayer intends to hold the new property), the $6,000 realized gain will not be recognized, and the taxpayer's basis in the new asset will be $14,000. Because the new asset likely has a value of $20,000 (in an arms'-length transaction the two assets would be deemed to have equal values), the $6,000 unrecognized gain is preserved in the new asset. Thus, in any like-kind exchange, the exact amount of any unrecognized gain or loss is preserved in the basis of the asset acquired in the exchange.

== Other property given or received in the exchange: "boot" ==
Sometimes taxpayers participating in a like-kind exchange receive cash or other property in addition to the like-kind property. This non-like-kind property is referred to as a "boot", (from the phrase "to boot", as in "I got like-kind property and other property to boot"). However, when that occurs, the taxpayer has not received solely like-kind property. Fortunately, a "ceiling rule" in section 1031 takes care of this problem by providing that gain or loss is recognized, but only to the extent of the amount of boot received.

For example, let's say a taxpayer receives like-kind property worth $12,000 and $8,000 in cash in exchange for old property with a basis of $14,000. The basis in the new property is determined by subtracting the cash received ($8,000) from the basis in the old property ($14,000) and then adding the gain recognized ($6,000). Thus, upon a cash sale of the new property for its fair market value of $12,000, no gain or loss would result.

== Assumption of taxpayer's liability ==
Property transferred in a like-kind exchange is often encumbered by liabilities and debt, especially where the asset is real estate. In this regard, the tax code treats relief from indebtedness as additional cash boot in a like-kind exchange. In other words, the assumption of a taxpayer's debt is treated like the receipt of cash by the taxpayer.

For instance, let's say a taxpayer has an asset worth $20,000 and a basis of $8,000 with a debt in the amount of $4,000. The taxpayer trades the asset in exchange for like-kind property worth $16,000, and the other party to the exchange expressly assumes the $4,000 liability. The other party will be unwilling to pay any extra consideration in this transaction, because the taxpayer is receiving $16,000 of equity (property worth $20,000 but subject to a debt of $4,000) in exchange for property worth $16,000. No extra consideration should be paid.

The receipt of a boot will trigger recognition of gain when gain is realized on the exchange of the original asset, as shown above. A boot does not trigger recognition when a loss is realized.

For example: Ashley trades in a business truck with an adjusted basis of $27,000 for another business truck worth $18,000 plus $2,000 of cash. Ashley realizes a $7,000 loss which is all deferred and no gain or loss is recognized. The $2,000 cash only makes a difference in calculating realized, not recognized loss.

== Loss property ==
While taxpayers generally prefer non-recognition for realized gains (so they do not have to recognize the gain currently and pay the resulting federal income tax currently), they usually prefer to recognize realized losses currently in order to obtain the tax benefit of the resulting deduction sooner. That means a like-kind exchange is bad news in the case of a realized loss. None of the loss will be recognized regardless of the boot received.

=== Loss property with a relative ===
Section 267(a) of the tax code disallows deductions for losses resulting from sales to related persons. However, the basis of the property received by the taxpayer in a like-kind exchange with a relative is governed by section 1031. In other words, the taint of disallowance under section 267 does not carry over to the new asset. The loss is preserved in the basis of the new property when the new property is sold.

== Simultaneous three-party like-kind exchanges ==
In many cases, two parties are unable to complete a like-kind exchange alone. For instance, one party may not wish to receive like-kind property or may wish to recognize loss on property that has declined in value. The two parties may involve a third party willing to pay cash (perhaps because the new property has a value less than the old property's basis, or because the taxpayer's desire for cash exceeds the desire to minimize liability for federal income taxes). When a third party willing to pay cash is involved, however, Revenue Ruling 77-297 indicates that non-recognition will apply if the taxpayer acquires the new property solely for the purpose of exchanging it with property of a like-kind.

== Deferred like-kind exchange ==
In Starker v. United States, (see section 1031) the court held that a taxpayer was entitled to section 1031 non-recognition upon the ultimate receipt of like-kind property, even though the taxpayer in that case had already transferred the property to the buyer and even though the taxpayer had up to five years to identify the replacement property. Congress responded to this ruling by imposing time limits on the identification and receipt of replacement property.

Nowadays, taxpayers must identify the replacement property within 45 days of the transfer of like-kind property. Taxpayers must also receive the replacement property within 180 days of transfer of like-kind property.

== Reporting ==
Due to periodic changes to the tax code, as well as detailed regulations that contain a number of technical requirements, it is important to check the most current rules and regulations before proceeding with a like-kind exchange. Current rules require taxpayers to submit an 8824 form to the IRS. detailing the terms of the deal.

== As a "tax loophole" ==
As of 2013, expansion and exploitation by major corporations of like-kind exchanges, originally intended to relieve family farmers of capital gains tax when swapping land or livestock, to avoid taxes was cited by The New York Times as an example of the need for tax reform.

== See also ==
- Fixed asset
- Alderson v. Commissioner
- Jordan Marsh Co. v. Commissioner

== Sources ==
- Samuel A. Donaldson, Federal Income Taxation of Individuals: Cases, Problems & Materials. 2nd edition. American Casebook Series, Thomson West: St. Paul, Minnesota, 2007, 558-571.
