= Installment sale =

Term in United States income tax law

In United States income tax law, an installment sale is generally a "disposition of property where at least 1 loan payment is to be received after the close of the taxable year in which the disposition occurs." The term "installment sale" does not include, however, a "dealer disposition" (as defined in the statute) or, generally, a sale of inventory. The installment method of accounting provides an exception to the general principles of income recognition by allowing a taxpayer to defer the inclusion of income of amounts that are to be received from the disposition of certain types of property until payment in cash or cash equivalents is received. The installment method defers the recognition of income when compared with both the cash and accrual methods of accounting. Under the cash method, the taxpayer would recognize the income when it is received, including the entire sum paid in the form of a negotiable note. The deferral advantages of the installment method are the most pronounced when comparing to the accrual method, under which a taxpayer must recognize income as soon as he or she has a right to the income.

== Process ==
If a taxpayer realizes income (e.g., gain) from an installment sale, the income generally may be reported by the taxpayer under the "installment method." The "installment method" is defined as "a method under which the income recognized for any taxable year [ . . . ] is that proportion of the payments received in that year which the gross profit [ . . . ] bears to the total contract price." This means that if, for instance, a taxpayer sells real estate with a basis of $250,000 for $1,000,000, resulting in 75% total profit, then the taxpayer should claim 75% of the total principal payments received during the taxable year as gross income. The interest on the note is included in gross income by the taxpayer according to the taxpayer's usual method of accounting.

Nothing in the language of the governing statute (section 453 of the Internal Revenue Code) requires the use of the installment method where the disposition results in a loss. If the taxpayer disposes of property in an installment sale, he or she reports a portion of the gain at the time of receipt of each installment payment. Income from an installment sale is generally reported on IRS Form 6252, Installment Sale Income, to be included in the taxpayer's Federal income tax return for each year in which a payment is received.

Taxpayers may elect out of the installment method and report the entire gain in the year of disposition, even though at least one payment will not have been received by the close of that year) by making the election on a timely filed income tax return for the tax year in which the disposition occurs.

"Contract price" does not necessarily mean the dollar amount agreed to by contract. Instead, Treasury Regulation Sec. 15A.453-1(b)(2)(iii) defines contract price as "the total contract price equal to selling price reduced by that portion of any qualifying indebtedness...assumed or taken subject to by the buyer, which does not exceed the seller's basis in the property (adjusted, for installment sales in taxable years ending after October 19, 1980, to reflect commissions and other selling expenses as provided in paragraph (b)(2)(v) of this section)." Qualifying indebtedness is further defined as a "mortgage or other indebtedness encumbering the property and indebtedness, not secured by the property but incurred or assumed by the purchaser incident to the purchaser's acquisition, holding, or operation in the ordinary course of business or investment, of the property." Qualifying indebtedness specifically excludes any debts that are incident to the disposition of the property, such as legal fees incurred during the sale, or debts that are not functionally related to the taxpayer's holding of the property. This method of calculating contract price allows the installment method to more accurately account for the taxpayer's basis in the property.

== Electing out and contingent payments ==
One of the primary reasons that sellers elect out of the installment method is the harsh treatment of contingencies in the regulations accompanying IRC 453. Contingent payments are common in some types of installment sales, where, for example, payments are based on the actual rather than the expected profitability of the item sold (typically some percentage of the future profits). Where the contract calls for contingent payments, the regulations recognize three possibilities.

First, the contingent payments may be subject to a stated maximum selling price, e.g., "5% of future profits up to a maximum of $1,000,000." In this case, the regulations require the seller to calculate the profit ratio by assuming that the maximum will actually be reached. As compared to a situation where the maximum in fact is not reached, this requirement has the effect of increasing the profit ratio and thus the gain reportable for each year, deferring recovery of basis. Any deficiency between the actual amounts received and the stated maximum selling price will result in unrecovered basis, for which no loss may be reported until there is no more right to future payments.

Second, if there is no maximum selling price, the contingent payments may be subject to a finite duration, e.g., "5% of future profits for ten years." In this case, the regulations require the basis to be apportioned ratably over the years in which payment can be received. Basis that is not used in one year is carried over to the next year. Especially if the item sold declines in profitability over the stated finite duration, it is possible that there will be unrecovered basis at the end of the period, for which no loss may be reported until that final year.

Finally, there may be neither a maximum selling price nor a finite duration. In this case, the first step is to consider whether there is a sale at all; the transaction may in fact be for rent or royalties, since beneficial ownership arguably remains with the seller. However, if there is in fact a sale, there are two possibilities. First, the transaction may be subject to the judicial "open transaction doctrine" of Burnet v. Logan. Almost no sales are subject to this doctrine because it is applicable only to unusual and rare sales that are wholly speculative and impossible to value. If the open transaction doctrine applies, the taxpayer may completely recover basis before reporting any gain. This is by far the best tax treatment for the transaction, but it is likely to be attacked by the IRS and in most circumstances would not be sustained.

More likely, a contingent sale in the third category would be a closed transaction. This is the worst-case scenario. In this case, basis is allocated ratably over a fifteen-year period, but unused basis is not simply carried forward into the next year; instead unused basis is re-allocated over the balance of the 15-year term. No loss may be reported until the final year.

In all three of these scenarios, there is the possibility that there will be unrecovered basis on the back end of the transaction resulting in a capital loss. If, for example, the seller is an individual who is retiring off of the proceeds of the sale, the capital loss on the back end would be almost worthless (except to the nominal extent usable against ordinary income).

The alternative is to elect out of the installment method. In that case, the seller reports the fixed amounts (taking original issue discount into account for future fixed payments) plus the fair market value of the right to contingent payments. The taxpayer pays tax up front in the year of the sale on this total amount realized. The taxpayer then has a basis in the right to contingent payments equal to the amount reported as fair market value. The good news here is that the seller gets a little piece of the open transaction doctrine, and may fully recover basis in the contingent piece of the sale before reporting any additional contingent payments in future years. Where the profit ratio would have been high anyway and the fair market value of the contingent payments are low, the taxpayer may experience favorable consequences by effectively paying a little more tax up front and in return getting the first crop of contingent payments tax-free, while eliminating the risk of an unusable future capital loss.

Whether or not the seller elects out, the total net gain or loss reported will be the same, but timing and characterization can vary widely.

== Treatment of escrowed consideration ==
If, instead of a note, consideration is held back in an escrow account, installment reporting may be available if the escrow imposes a "substantial restriction" and is arranged to "serve a bona fide interest of the buyer." For example, if the escrow secures representations and warranties of the seller, installment reporting is available to report payments as they are released from escrow. In contrast, if amounts are released from escrow with the mere passage of time, installment reporting is not available.

Whether, in a merger or acquisition, escrows established to secure the continued employment of selling shareholders who are also management employees (so-called "golden handcuffs") are reportable on the installment method is currently an unresolved question, even if it is assumed that such amounts are properly treated as merger consideration and not compensation for employment. On the one hand, such conditions are clearly established for the benefit of the buyer. On the other, amounts in escrow appear to be released with the passage of time in a manner that is within the control of the seller, and so arguably the escrow does not impose a "substantial" restriction.

== Impact ==
Installment sales are a valuable tool to help sellers defer tax. As with any other seller financing, however, the seller is generally at risk with respect to the buyer's creditworthiness or ability to manage the asset. The seller may often retain a lien against the property to secure payment of the installment obligation, which itself may or may not be evidenced by a promissory note.

The installment sale allows buyers to obtain an asset such as real estate without bank financing. The seller is then at risk of buyer default and the consequential repossession/foreclosure of the asset.

== Alternatives ==
Sales methods called the structured sale, ensured installment sale, or monetized installment sale are variations of the traditional installment sale and are intended to protect the seller completely from the risk in connection with the buyer's creditworthiness. A specialized installment sale is known as the installment sale trust is a form of IRC section 453 and offers unique advantages that a traditional installment sale does not; such as diversification, liquidity, and typically are longer in the term.
