= Carryover basis =

Carryover basis occurs when a property transfer also results in a transfer of the transferor's basis in the property. The transferor's basis in the property "carries over" to the transferee.

== Tax law of United States of America ==
Carryover basis, also referred to as a transferred basis, applies to inter vivos gifts and transfers in trust. Generally, a taxpayer's basis in property is the cost to acquire the property. However, there is an exception for inter vivos gifts and transfers in trust. For gifts, to calculate a gain, the donee has the same basis in the property as the donor's adjusted basis in the property. The same rule applies for calculating a loss, unless the donor's adjusted basis is greater than the fair market value of the property at the time of the gift. In this case, the loss does not carry over and the basis is the fair market value of the property at the time of the gift.

== Example ==
In 1998, Mother purchased a lamp for $20. In 2000, Mother gifted the lamp to Daughter. At the time of the gift, the lamp's fair market value was $10. In 2002, Daughter sells the lamp to John.

(a) Daughter sells the lamp for $38. For the purpose of determining gain, Daughter uses Mother's carryover basis ($20). Thus, Daughter realizes an $18 gain in the sale to John.

(b) Daughter sells the lamp for $8. For the purpose of determining loss, Daughter uses the fair market value of the property at the time of the gift ($10). Thus, she realizes a $2 loss in the sale to John.

(c) Daughter sells the lamp for $15. For the purpose of determining gain, she uses Mother's basis of $20. Thus, there is no gain. But there is no loss either; for the purpose of determining loss, Daughter uses the fair market value of the property at the time of the gift ($10). Thus, Daughter realizes neither a gain nor a loss in the sale to John.

== Carryover Basis in Related Disciplines ==
In tax law, the concept of carryover basis is prevalent in the formation of a business.

In partnership taxation, carryover basis occurs when a partner contributes capital to the partnership in exchange for a partnership interest. The partnership's basis in the contributed capital asset will be the same as the basis of the partner who contributed the asset.

In corporate taxation, carryover basis occurs when a person contributes a capital asset to a newly formed corporation controlled by the transferor or to an existing corporation in which the transferor gains control. The corporation's basis in the asset then is the same as the transferor's.

== See also ==
- Cost basis
- Tax accounting
