= Jordan Marsh Co. v. Commissioner =

American legal case

- Court: United States Court of Appeals for the Second Circuit
- Argued: November 14, 1958
- Decided: August 13, 1959
- Citations: 269 F.2d 453; 59-2 USTC (CCH) ¶ 9641

Case history
- Prior history: T.C. Memo. 1957-237; 16 T.C.M. (CCH) 1094 (1957)

Court membership
- Judges sitting: Carroll C. Hincks, Joseph Edward Lumbard, Leonard P. Moore

Case opinions
- Majority: Hincks, joined by a unanimous court

Laws applied
- Internal Revenue Code

Jordan Marsh Co. v. Commissioner, 269 F.2d 453 (2d Cir. 1959) was a United States income tax case decided by the United States Court of Appeals for the Second Circuit.

== Background ==
=== Facts ===
Petitioner Jordan Marsh & Company conveyed the fee of two parcels on which it operated a department store in Boston. In return, petitioner received a cash payment which represented the fair market value of the properties. Petitioner also received long-term leases of the same properties, with a conditional option to renew.

=== Tax return ===
Petitioner claimed the transaction was a sale under 26 U.S.C. § 112(a) and sought a deduction. The commissioner disallowed the deduction, determining that the transaction represented an exchange of property for other property of like kind.

=== Tax court ===
The tax court affirmed—upheld the deficiency assessment for income and excess profits tax against petitioner due to the disallowance of a deduction taken pursuant to 26 U.S.C.S. § 112(a).

== Opinion of the court ==
The court reversed the judgment of the tax court because the transaction had to be classified as a sale since petitioner received cash equal to the full value of the properties conveyed along with the long-term leases of the properties.

The court determined that petitioner did more than just make a change in the form of its ownership. By the transaction, petitioner's capital invested in the real estate had been completely liquidated for cash to an amount fully equal to the value of the fee. Because petitioner received cash for the full value of the property conveyed, the court held the transaction had to be classified as a sale. Therefore, the court reversed the judgment of the tax court.

== See also ==
- Alderson v. Commissioner
