= Massachusetts business trust =

History

A Massachusetts Business Trust (MBT) is a legal trust set up for the purposes of business, but not necessarily one that is operated in the Commonwealth of Massachusetts. The name comes from the first legally recognized business trusts being created in Massachusetts. They may also be referred to as an unincorporated business organization or UBO. Business trusts may be established under the laws of other U.S. states.

Many businesses are formed as MBTs to mitigate taxation; mutual funds in the U.S. are often structured as MBTs, though sometimes they are organized as Maryland corporations (or other states such as Minnesota). More recently, a Delaware statutory trust or DST has become a popular form of organization, and many new funds have been organizing as DSTs and existing funds converting to DSTs. Since mutual funds are investment companies and not operating companies, many traditional corporation rules and requirements do not fit them well.

During much of the 20th century the tax laws and state regulations strongly favored corporate structures. Tightening laws near the end of the century resulted in the resurgence of the use of the UBO. For example, in 1985 the Scudder Capital Growth Fund, Inc., and Kemper Money Market Fund, Inc., changed their forms of organization from a corporation to a business trust.

== History ==
The business trust made its debut in Massachusetts in 1827. As a result, a U.S. business trust today is often called a "Massachusetts trust" in legal circles. The U.S. Supreme Court defined the Massachusetts trust as a form of business organization, common in Massachusetts consisting essentially of an arrangement whereby property is conveyed to trustees: in accordance with terms of the trust. The business is to be held and managed for the benefit of persons who hold transferable certificates issued by the trustees showing the shares into which the beneficial interest in the property is divided.

This method of transacting business in commercial enterprises originated in Massachusetts as a result of negative laws prohibiting the development of real estate without a special act of the legislature or in other words, without "permission" of the state . So, the Business Trust was created under Common-law right to contract to obtain legislatively constructed business organizations advantages but without having to gain "permission" to enter into a business activity and suffer under the burdens and restrictions that are placed on "statutorily constructed organizations".

It states on page 1681 of Black's Law Dictionary 4Ed., 1957, under the term "Massachusetts or Business Trust"; See "Trust Estate as Business Company." This particular definition is found on page 1684 and it states this:

TRUST ESTATE AS BUSINESS COMPANIES. A practice originating in Massachusetts of vesting a business or certain real estate in a group of trustees, who manage it for the benefit of the beneficial owners; the ownership of the latter is evidenced by negotiable (or transferable) shares. The trustees are elected by the shareholders, or in case of a vacancy, by the board of trustees. Provision is made in the agreement and declaration of the trust to the effect that when new trustees are elected, the trust estate shall vest in them without further conveyance. The declaration of the trust specifies the power of the trustees. They have a common seal; the board is organized with the usual officers of a board of trustees; it is governed by by-laws; the officers have the usual powers of like corporation officers; so far as practicable, the trustees in their collective capacity, are to carry on the business under a specified name. The trustees may also hold shares as beneficiaries. Provision may be made for the alteration or specified manner. In Eliot v. Freeman, 31 Sup. Ct. 360, 220 U.S. 178, 55 L. Ed. 424, it was held that such a trust was not within the corporation tax provisions of the tariff act of Aug. 5 1909 See also Zonne v. Minneapolis Syndicate, 31 S. Ct. 361, 220 U.S. 187, 55 L. Ed. 428 (Black's Law Dictionary 1957, 4Ed., page 1684)

== Taxation ==
The terms "business trust", "Massachusetts trust", and "unincorporated business organization" are not used in the Internal Revenue Code. (The terms "business trust" and "Massachusetts trust" are used in other Federal laws to clarify that they are to be treated as corporations under those laws.) The regulations require that trusts operating a trade or business be treated as a corporation, partnership, or sole proprietorship, if the grantor (also known as a "settlor" or "trustor"), beneficiary, or fiduciary (also known as a "trustee") materially participates in the operations or daily management of the business. If the grantor maintains control of the trust, then grantor trust rules will apply. Otherwise, the trust would be treated as a simple or complex trust, depending on the trust instrument. (Source: www.irs.gov)

=== I.R.S. income tax implications ===
For IRS income tax purposes in the United States, there are several kinds of trusts: grantor trusts whose tax consequences flow directly to the settlor's Form 1040 (I.R.S. Individual Income Tax Return) and state return, simple trusts in which all the income created must be distributed to one or more beneficiaries and is therefore taxed to the non-settlor beneficiary (e.g., the widow of a trust created by the late husband), whether or not the income is actually distributed (which can occur), and complex trusts, which are, in general, all trusts that are not grantor trusts or simple trusts. Some trusts may alternate between simple and complex under certain conditions. Many but not all trust organizations do their own tax work. This can be highly specialized work.

All simple and complex trusts are irrevocable and in both cases any capital gains realized in the portfolios are taxed to the trust corpus or principal.

== See also ==
- Mutual fund
- Real estate Investment Trust (REIT)
- Trust (law)
