= Tax strategy (UK) =

Annual legal document for large businesses

A tax strategy is a document required to be published annually by businesses which operate in the United Kingdom with a turnover above £200m or a balance sheet above £2 billion. This requirement is set out in Section 161 of the Finance Act 2016. A group of companies may produce a "group tax strategy".

Academic research published in 2025 questions how much impact this disclosure requirement has had to date.

== Components ==
A company's tax strategy must set out:

(a) the company's approach to risk management and governance arrangements in relation to UK taxation,

(b) the company's attitude towards tax planning (so far as affecting UK taxation),

(c) the level of risk in relation to UK taxation that the company is prepared to accept,

(d) the company's approach towards its dealings with HMRC.

A company meeting the turnover or balance sheet thresholds which fails to comply may be fined.

Accountants Ernst and Young estimate that over 2000 UK businesses are affected by this requirement.
