= Contingent payment sales =

In business dealings, transactions often occur that include variables based on future events that can be difficult to ascertain (for example, a company may sell in an amount stock along with a percentage of that company's net profits.) As these transactions are contingent on payments that occur in the future, and the total selling price cannot be determined as of the end of the taxable year of the sale, they are known as Contingent Payment Sales. Because of the uncertainty surrounding the final amounts of these transactions, they are difficult to evaluate for the purpose of tax liability. Section 483 of the Internal Revenue Code provides descriptions for the handling of contingent payments and interest on contingent payments.

== Methods of computing tax liability for contingent sales ==
=== Maximum Selling Price ===
If the maximum amount of sales can be determined in the year in which they occur by assuming that all contingencies are met, the price can be calculated in a manner similar to the installment sales method. If the amount is reduced in subsequent years, than the formula is recomputed accordingly.

=== Fixed Period ===
If the maximum selling price cannot be determined, but the period over which payments may be received is fixed, then the seller's basis is recovered ratably over the period during which payment may be received under the contract.

- If the agreement neither specifies a stated maximum price nor limits payments to a fixed period, than a question arises as to whether a sale has realistically occurred.

== Example in Finance ==
=== General Mills Acquisition Case ===
Seeking to build growth momentum, General Mills studied areas of potential growth and value creation in the spring of 1998. This had generated some smaller acquisitions and a general receptivity to acquisition proposals by the firm. In early 2000, the firm's financial advisers suggested that Diageo might be interested in selling Pillsbury, in an effort to focus Diageo on its beverage business, and that Pillsbury would complement General Mills’ existing businesses.

In March 2000, Diageo's chief operating officer contacted General Mills’ chairman and CEO to explore a possible sale of Pillsbury. General Mills submitted its proposed deal terms to Diageo in June 2000—the total proposed payment was $10.0 billion. Diageo submitted an offer price of $10.5 billion. The two sides would budge no further, and it looked as if the negotiations would founder. General Mills did not want to issue more than one-third of its post-transaction shares to Diageo, and believed that its shares were undervalued in the stock market. Diageo believed it was necessary to value General Mills’ shares at the current trading prices. In an effort to bridge the difference in positions, the two firms agreed upon including in the terms of the deal a contingent payment on the first anniversary of the transaction that would depend on General Mills’ share price. James Lawrence, chief financial officer of General Mills, said, “We genuinely believe this is a way in which they could have their cake and we could eat it, too. There’s no question in my mind that, absent this instrument, we wouldn’t have been able to reach this deal.”

David Van Benschoten, General Mills’ treasurer, added that the contingent payment was another example of the “development of the use of [options] in the past 20 years as finance has come to first understand, and work with, the constructs of optionality.”
