= Monetized installment sale =

A monetized installment sale is a special type of installment sale whereby a seller of appreciated assets attempts to defer U.S. Federal income tax liability over a period of years while currently receiving cash or other liquid assets via a monetization transaction, such as a loan.

Pursuant to section 453 of the Internal Revenue Code, installment sale treatment allows a seller to defer recognition of a portion of the gain on the sale of an asset where at least one payment is to be received by the seller after the close of the taxable year in which the sale occurs. In a monetized installment sale, the seller defers recognition of tax on the installment sale payments while 'monetizing' the installment note via a separate, tax free borrowing.

Although the tax is deferred until the receipt of payment under the installment contract, an interest charge is imposed on installment sales above $5,000,000, except in the case of agricultural assets, which has no limitation.

== Used by public companies ==
Because of the lack of limitation on agricultural assets, installment sales generally, and monetized installment sales in particular, have been popular among public companies selling their timberland assets.

Notable monetized installment sales that public companies have reported from 1999 to the present have included:

1. The $43.25 Million Monetized Installment Sale by GREIF, Inc.
2. The $617 Million Monetized Installment Sale by Kimberly Clark.
3. The $350 Million Monetized Installment Sale by Plum Creek.
4. The $1.47 Billion Monetized Installment Sale by OfficeMax.

These transactions typically are structured with the help of an advisor in connection with the imminent sale of the appreciated asset. Among public companies, the closing of the transaction has been contingent upon the company's receipt of a private ruling from the Internal Revenue Service (IRS).

== Internal Revenue Service review ==
The Internal Revenue Service's (IRS's) analysis in the above referenced memorandum focused on the step transaction doctrine and the substance over form doctrine. The IRS concluded that the transaction was permissible and that the judicial doctrines of substance over form and step transaction did not apply in that case. While the monetization component of the transaction had an unusual interest rate, it concluded:

"Taxpayer needed to sell its Asset and structured the sale in a way that minimized its taxes... Substantively, the steps of the Transaction matched their form: an installment sale coupled with a monetization loan. The Transaction allowed Taxpayer to take advantage of tax deferral on the asset sale, which is a permitted result under I.R.C. §§ 453 and 453A."

Because a monetized installment sale is subject to these standard levels of review, it is important that all components of the transaction (i.e. the installment sale and the subsequent loan) be structured in accordance standard commercial documentation and terms.

An article on the transaction was published, "Monetizing Installment Sale Transactions," 31 Corporate Taxation 29, in November 2004.

== Alternatives ==
While monetized installment sales are used to defer taxable gain while maintaining near liquidity, a related transaction may be employed to achieve other objectives. For example, a structured sale based on Private Letter Ruling 150850-07 is common where the seller wants to defer tax but receive a guaranteed income stream from a high quality payer such as an insurance company or other highly rated financial institution.
