= Stepped-up basis =

Provision of US Tax Code regarding estate taxes

The tax code of the United States holds that when a person (the beneficiary) receives an asset from a giver (the benefactor) after the benefactor dies, the asset receives a stepped-up basis, which is its market value at the time the benefactor dies (Internal Revenue Code § 1014(a)). A stepped-up basis can be higher than the before-death cost basis, which is the benefactor's purchase price for the asset, adjusted for improvements or losses. Because taxable capital-gain income is the selling price minus the basis, a high stepped-up basis can greatly reduce the beneficiary's taxable capital-gain income if the beneficiary sells the inherited asset.

== General rule ==
Under IRC § 1014(a), which applies to an asset that a person (the beneficiary) receives from a giver (the benefactor) after the benefactor dies, the general rule is that the beneficiary's basis equals the fair market value of the asset at the time the benefactor dies. This can result in a stepped-up basis or a stepped-down basis. An example of a stepped-up basis: If Benefactor owned a home that Benefactor purchased for $35,000, then Benefactor's basis in the home would be equal to its purchase price, $35,000, assuming no adjustments under IRC § 1016, which allows for increases in basis such as home improvements, or decreases in basis such as unrepaired windstorm damage. Continuing the example, the fair market value of Benefactor's home was $100,000 on the day Benefactor died. After Beneficiary inherits the home from Benefactor, Beneficiary's basis in the home is that fair market value, $100,000. In contrast, if Benefactor gives the home to Beneficiary before Benefactor dies, then Beneficiary receives a carryover basis, which is equal to the Benefactor's purchase price for the home, $35,000, again assuming no adjustments under IRC § 1016.

=== Simplified Example ===
"Basis" is generally the amount a taxpayer has invested in an asset. Thus, in the very simple case, if a taxpayer buys a house for $35,000, his "basis" is $35,000.

"Gain", in the very simple case, is the amount a taxpayer receives when a taxpayer disposes of an asset, minus the taxpayer's basis in the asset. Thus, if a taxpayer sold the house above for $100,000, the taxpayer's gain (what the taxpayer might be taxed on) would be $65,000 (sales price of $100,000 minus the taxpayer's basis of $35,000), if we ignore complicating factors for purposes of this general example.

Normally, when someone receives an asset from a taxpayer before he dies, the person who receives the asset keeps the same basis in the asset that the taxpayer, the donor, had. For example, if a taxpayer's sister Mary were to receive this house from the taxpayer before he dies, then her basis in the house would also be $35,000, no matter what the fair market value (FMV) of the house was on the date of the gift. Therefore, if the taxpayer's sister were to sell the house for $100,000, she would generally need to pay income tax on the $65,000 of capital-gain income.

However, in the case of a beneficiary who receives an asset from a benefactor after the benefactor's death, the beneficiary's basis in the asset is "stepped up" to the FMV on the date of the death. For example: If, on the date of a taxpayer's death, he had a basis of $35,000 in the house and the house's FMV was $100,000, and the taxpayer's sister received the house from the taxpayer after his death, then her stepped-up basis would be $100,000, not $35,000. Therefore, if the taxpayer's sister were to sell the house for $100,000, she would not have to pay any income tax because the sales price ($100,000) minus her stepped-up basis ($100,000) would be a capital-gain income of zero.

See the explanation under "Rationale for stepped-up basis" (below) for an explanation of why the Tax Code would do this.

== Stepped-down basis ==
Likewise, under § 1014(a), if a benefactor's adjusted basis in the property is higher than the fair market value, the beneficiary's basis will equal the fair market value of the property at the time the benefactor dies. For example, Benefactor owns a yacht whose adjusted basis is $150,000, but at the time of Benefactor's death, the fair market value of the yacht is only $110,000. The beneficiary's basis in the yacht will be the fair market value, $110,000.

== Incentive for taxpayers ==
Because of this provision, any appreciation of the affected property that occurred during the decedent's lifetime will never be taxed. Thus, this provision provides an incentive for taxpayers to retain appreciated property until death, and sell property that has fallen in market value while alive (although property on which one may take depreciation may still cause a gain — even when sold for less its original purchase price—because depreciation subtracts from basis).

== § 2032 Election for Alternate Valuation ==
Section 2032 provides an alternate method of determining the property's new basis. If the property is not disposed of within six months of the decedent's death, the executor may elect to use the property's fair market value six months after the date of death but only if such an election results in a decrease in the value of the gross estate. If the executor does not so elect, or if the property is disposed of before the six months have passed, then the property will still assume a basis equal to its fair market value at the time of death.

== Definitions ==
"Property acquired from the decedent" under IRC § 1014(b) generally includes property acquired by "bequest, devise or inheritance", property the decedent gives to his or her estate, and certain revocable trusts.

== Rationale for stepped-up basis ==
The primary purpose for the stepped-up basis rule under IRC § 1014 is so that, for estates without exemptions to the federal government's estate tax on transfers of wealth at death, the estate's assets are taxed only by estate taxes and not also on the capital gains during the decedent's lifetime. Additionally, the step up basis within the constraints of the estate process avoids the difficulty of ascertaining a decedent's adjusted basis in property that could have been held for decades.

== Extension ==
Prior to Pub. L. 111–312, IRC § 1014(f) provided that this section would not apply to decedents dying after December 31, 2009. As of December 2010, the anticipated sunset provision was removed with the passage of the "Tax Relief, Unemployment Insurance Reauthorization, and Job Creation Act of 2010".
