= Transnational Corporations Observatory =

Transnational Corporations Observatory is a Non-profit organization, created by Régis Castellani in October 1999 in Martigues, France. A Transnational Corporation (TNC) is a company or organisation that possesses and controls the free flow of its goods in more than one country.

It operates a comprehensive database driven web site at that cover over 10,000 companies and 21,000 brands with information on social and environmental behaviour, financial data, list of brands, membership to the most influential lobbies, public relations and "opinion making", managers name and position, shareholders and subsidiaries, plants locations and offshore centers, brand management and corporate image management.

== See also ==
- List of management topics - similar content
