= Installment sales method =

The installment sales method is one of several approaches used to recognize revenue under the US GAAP, specifically when revenue and expense are recognized at the time of cash collection rather than at the time of sale. Under the US GAAP, it is the principal method of revenue recognition when the recognition occurs subsequently to the sale.

== Installment sales method ==
The installment sales method, is used to recognize revenue after the sale has occurred and when sales are stipulated under very extended cash collection terms. In general, when the risk of not being able to collect is reasonably high and when there is no reasonable basis for estimating the proportion of installment accounts, revenue recognition is deferred, and the installment sales method is used. The installment sales method is typically used to account for sales of consumer durables, retail land sales, and retirement property. Under the cost recovery method, another method to recognize income after the sale is made, no profit is recognized until all the costs are recovered.

== Calculation under the installment sales method ==
The installment sales method recognizes revenue and income proportionately as cash is collected. The amount recognized in any period is thus based on two factors:

1. The gross profit percentage: $\frac{Gross Profit}{Sales}$
2. The amount of cash collected on installment accounts receivable.

Below is an example of calculation of installment sales for years 2009 and 2010.

	2009	2010
Installment sales	$1,200,000	$1,300,000
Cost on installment goods sold	$840,000	$884,000
Gross profit	$360,000	$416,000
Gross profit percentage	30%	32%
Cash collections		
On 2009 installment sales	$300,000	$600,000
On 2010 installments sales		$340,000

- 2009 income from installment sales calculation:

The income recognized in 2009 equals cash collections in 2009 multiplied by the gross profit percentage in 2009 and is calculated as follows:

$300,000×30% = $90,000

Such income is shown on the 2009 income statement as 2009 income from installment sales.

- 2009 Deferred Gross Profit calculation:

The deferred gross profit is an A/R contra-account and is the difference between gross profit and recognized income and is calculated as follows:

$360,000 − $90,000 = $270,000

The deferred gross profit is thus deferred and recognized in income in subsequent periods, i.e. when the installment receivables are collected in cash.

- 2010 income from installment sales is $288,800 and calculated as follows:

Total 2010 installment sales income	
	Gross profit recognized
Component relating to 2009 Sales	
Cash collections in 2010 from 2009 sales	$600,000
Multiplied by year 2009 gross profit percentage	30%
	$180,000
Component relating to 2010 sales	
Cash collections in 2010 from 2010 sales	$340,000
Multiplied by year 2010 gross profit percentage	32%
	$108,800
Total installment sales income recognized in 2010	$288,800

A more comprehensive table would clearly show gross profit and deferred income recognized for each year: 2009 and 2010.

	2009	2010
Installment sales	$1,200,000	$1,300,000
Cost of installment goods sold	($840,000)	(884,000)
Gross profit	360,000	416,000
Less: Deferred gross profit on installment sales of current year	(270,000)	(307,200)
Gross profit recognized on current year's sales	90,000	108,800
Plus: Gross profit recognized on installment sales of prior years		180,000
Total gross profit recognized in the year	$90,000	$288,800

Installment sales and the related costs of good sold must be tracked by individual year in order to compute the gross profit percentage that applies to each year. Furthermore, the accounting system must correctly match the cash collections with the specific sales year so that the correct gross profit percentage be applied.

On the balance sheet, "the accounts receivable - installment sales" is classified as current assets if it is due within 12 months of the balance sheet. Otherwise, it is classified as long term assets.

Under the GAAP, the interest component of the periodic cash proceeds is computed separately. In fact, interest payments are not considered when the recognized gross profit is computed on installment sales. Certain procedures differentiate between principal and interest payments on customer receivables.

== Comparison to the cash and accrual method ==
Cash method – The cash method requires that an amount be included in gross income when it is actually or constructively received. The installment method allows greater deferral when the payment is received in the form of a negotiable note. The cash method does not allow for differing between cost recovery and gain.

Accrual method – The accrual method requires income to be recognized as soon as the taxpayer has a right to the income regardless of when the payment is actually received. As such, the taxpayer would have to recognize the full amount of the sale despite the fact that the purchase price may not be paid in full for years.

== See also ==
- Tax
- Doctrine of cash equivalence
- Accounting methods
- Installment sale (USA)
- Revenue recognition
- Tax accounting

== Sources ==
- Revsine, Lawrence (2002), Financial reporting & analysis, Prentice Hall, ISBN 978-0-13-032351-4
- Siegel, Joel G. (2000), Dictionary of accounting terms, Barron's Educational Series, ISBN 978-0-7641-1259-1
