= Installment note =

An installment note is a form of promissory note calling for payment of both principal and interest in specified amounts, or specified minimum amounts, at specific time intervals. This periodic reduction of principal amortizes the loan.
