= Qualified intermediary =

Intermediary for tax-deferred exchanges

A Qualified Intermediary refers to a person that acts as an intermediary qualified under certain sections of the U.S. Internal Revenue Code (IRC) to undertake specified activities.

== IRC §1031 Qualified Intermediary ==
A §1031 Qualified Intermediary (QI), also known as an Accommodator, is a company that facilitates Internal Revenue Code section 1031 tax-deferred exchanges. The role of a QI is defined in Treas. Reg. §1.1031(k)-1(g)(4). Under IRC Section 1031 an owner of business or investment property may exchange that property for other like-kind property within a statutorily mandated period of time, and defer current recognition of gain on the sale of the old property.

Anyone who is related to the taxpayer, or who has had a financial relationship with the taxpayer (aside from providing routine financial services) within the two years prior to the close of escrow of the exchange cannot serve as the QI (including employees), unless those services were "[s]ervices for the taxpayer with respect to exchanges of property intended to qualify for nonrecognition of gain or loss under section 1031". This means that the taxpayer may only use his or her current attorney, accountant, investment banker, broker or real estate agent in exceptional circumstances. A QI should be bonded and insured against errors and omissions. Relevant educational background such as tax, law or finance is desired. Nevada is the only state that requires a QI to be licensed.

The QI enters into a written agreement with the taxpayer where QI transfers the relinquished property to the buyer, and transfers the replacement property to the taxpayer pursuant to the exchange agreement. The QI holds the proceeds from the sale of the relinquished property in a trust or escrow account in order to ensure the Taxpayer never has actual or constructive receipt of the sale proceeds.

When selecting a Qualified Intermediary (QI), it is important to consider the fact that there is little regulation governing these entities. Therefore, conducting due diligence is crucial in order to ensure the exchange funds are being held in a safe manner and the Exchanger's (entity/individual deferring taxes via 1031 Exchange) funds are protected in the event the Qualified Intermediary can't provide the funds at closing. In addition to that, it's important to make sure the QI being used is experienced and understands the tax code thoroughly.

== IRC §1441 Qualified Intermediary ==
IRC §1441 et seq. regulates the withholding of income taxes from payments of U.S. source income made to a non-U.S. person. Generally, the U.S. payor must verify the Tax Identification Number (TIN) of its payees and withhold 30% of this payment if a TIN is not presented. A §1441 Qualified Intermediary (QI) is generally a foreign bank or other foreign financial institution that signs an agreement with the Internal Revenue Service (IRS). Under the agreement, the QI maintains its own records of the U.S. or foreign status of the beneficial owners of the payments and may undertake responsibility for income reporting and tax withholding. The QI agreement is valid for 6 years and the QI entity is subject to an IRS or external audit periodically to confirm compliance with the agreement terms. The §1441 QI regime was later supplemented by foreign account reporting requirements under the Foreign Account Tax Compliance Act.

== See also ==
- Internal Revenue Code section 1031
- Straw man (law)
