= Repatriation tax holiday =

A repatriation tax holiday is a tax holiday specifically directed towards individuals and businesses in one country who repatriate to that country income earned in other countries. The theory supporting such an action is that multinational companies headquartered in one country, but which earn income in a second country will be unlikely to bring income from the second country back to their home country if high taxes will be assessed on this income when it is brought back. By allowing those companies to bring income back to the home country at a reduced tax rate, money will be injected into the economy of the home country that otherwise would remain in the second country.

In 2004, the United States Congress enacted such a tax holiday for U.S. multinational companies in the American Jobs Creation Act of 2004 (AJCA)) section 965, allowing them to repatriate foreign profits to the United States at a 5.25% tax rate, rather than the existing 35% corporate tax rate. Under this law, corporations brought $362 billion into the American economy, primarily for the purposes of paying dividends to investors, repurchasing shares, and purchasing other corporations. The largest multi-national companies, Apple Inc., Microsoft Corp., Alphabet Inc., Cisco Systems Inc., and Oracle Corp., recalled only 9% of their cash possessions following the 2004 act. In 2011, Senate Democrats, arguing against another repatriation tax holiday, issued a report asserting that the previous effort had actually cost the United States Treasury $3.3 billion, and that companies receiving the tax breaks had thereafter cut over 20,000 jobs. A second repatriation tax holiday was defeated in the United States Senate in 2009.

== See also ==
- Tax Cuts and Jobs Act of 2017 § Corporate tax
