= Installment Agreement =

An Installment Agreement is a United States Internal Revenue Service (IRS) program that allows individuals to pay tax debt in monthly payments.

There IRS has several different kinds of Installment Agreements; Guaranteed, Streamline, Partial and Full Pay. There are a number of requirements that have to be met before an installment agreement can be granted to a tax payer.

== Requirements ==
- Has to file all minimum required tax returns.
- Must owe $50,000 or less.
- Monthly payment cannot be less than $25 a month.
- Keep a check on future refunds that can applied for tax refunds until tax debt is paid in full.
