= Structured sale =

US tax management system

A structured sale or structured installment sale, is a special type of installment sale pursuant to the Internal Revenue Code. In an installment sale, the seller defers recognition of gain on the sale of a business or real estate to the tax year in which the related sale proceeds are received. In a structured sale, the seller is able to pay U.S. Federal income tax over time while having the seller's right to receive those payments guaranteed by a high credit quality alternate obligor. This obligor assumes the buyer's periodic payment obligation. Transactions can be arranged for amounts as small as $100,000.

To fund its future payment obligation, the assignment company then purchases an annuity from a life insurance company, United States treasuries via a trust or other financial instrument. Case law and administrative precedents support recognition of the original contract terms after a substitution of obligors. In addition, proper handling of the transaction will help the parties avoid problems with constructive receipt and economic benefit issues.

After Allstate Life stopped taking new annuity business in 2013, other structured sale opportunities arose. In lieu of annuities, United States Treasury obligations held in a trust (treasury funded structured settlements) are used to fund the future cash flows. Some companies use Key Man Life Insurance Policies in place of annuities, which provide the added protection of a death benefit to the seller and a payout that continues long after the seller passes. This arrangement may preferable when the seller is interested in passing wealth to the seller's beneficiaries after death. A Key Man Policy may also pay out more than an annuity in certain circumstances.

While negotiating the installment payments, the seller is free to design payment streams with a great deal of flexibility. Each installment payment to the seller has three components: return of basis, capital gain, and ordinary income earned on the money in the annuity. Under the doctrine of constructive receipt, with a properly documented structured sale, no taxable event is recognized until a payment is actually received. Taxation is the same as if the buyer were making installment payments directly.

Structured sales are an alternative to a section 1031 exchange. In a 1031 exchange, however, the seller is required to continue to hold some form of property. Structured sales work well for sellers who want to create a continuing stream of income without management worries. Retiring business owners and downsizing homeowners are examples of sellers who can benefit.

The structured sale must be documented, and money must be handled in such a way that the ultimate recipient is not treated as having constructively received the payment prior to the time it is actually made. For the buyer, there is no difference from a traditional cash-and-title-now deal, except for additional paperwork. Because of tax advantages to the seller, structuring the sale might, however, make the buyer's offer more attractive. Because the buyer has paid in full, the buyer gets full title at time of closing.

There are no direct fees to the buyer or seller to employ the structured sale strategy.

Alternatives

Sales methods called installment sale and monetized installment sale are variations of the structured sale and are intended to protect the seller of a capital asset completely from the risk in connection with the buyer's creditworthiness.

Confusion created by secondary market firms Some buyers of structured settlement payment rights have attempted to play off the popularity of the term structured sale to lure prospects for the sale of structured settlement payment rights.

The structured settlement specialist who implements the transaction is paid directly by the life insurance company that writes the annuity, or by the service provider for the treasury funded structured settlements.

The internal rate of return is comparable to long term high quality debt instruments.

Internal Revenue Service Private Letter Ruling 150850-07, dated June 2, 2008, confirmed the IRS position the taxpayer does not constructively receive payment for tax purposes until the actual cash payment is made pursuant to a properly drafted non-qualified assignment.
