= Cost basis =

In US tax law, a property's original cost

Basis (or cost basis), as used in United States tax law, is the original cost of property, adjusted for factors such as depreciation. When a property is sold, the taxpayer pays/(saves) taxes on a capital gain/(loss) that equals the amount realized on the sale minus the sold property's basis.

Cost basis is needed because tax is due based on the gain in value of an asset. For example, if a person buys a rock for $20, and sells the same rock for $20, there is no tax, since there is no profit. If, however, that person buys a rock for $20 and then sells the same rock for $25, then there is a capital gain on the rock of $5, which is thus taxable. The purchase price of $20 is analogous to cost of sales.

Typically, capital gains tax is due only when an asset is sold. However, the rules for this are very complicated. If tax is paid because the value has increased, the new value will be the cost basis for any future tax.

Internal Revenue Service (IRS) Publication 551 contains the IRS's definition of basis: "Basis is the amount of your investment in property for tax purposes. Use the basis of property to figure depreciation, amortization, depletion, and casualty losses. Also, use it to figure gain or loss on the sale or other disposition of property."

== Determining basis ==
For federal income taxation purposes, determining the basis depends on how the asset in question was acquired.

Assets acquired by purchase or contract: For assets purchased or acquired contractually, the basis equals the purchase price. See IRC (Internal Revenue Code) § 1012.

Assets acquired by gift or trust: The general rule is that assets acquired by gift or trust receive transferred basis (also called carryover basis). See IRC § 1015. Put simply, gifted assets retain the donor's basis. This means that the value of the asset at the time of transfer is irrelevant to computing the donee's new basis. The general rule does not apply, however, if at the time of transfer the donor's adjusted basis in the property exceeds its fair market value and the recipient disposes of the property at a loss. In this situation the asset's basis is its fair market value at the time of transfer. See Treas. Reg. § 1.1015-1(a)(1).

Assets acquired by inheritance: Assets acquired by inheritance are eligible to receive stepped-up basis, meaning the fair market value of the asset at the time of the decedent's death. See IRC § 1014. This provision shields the appreciation in value of the asset during the life of the decedent from any income taxation whatsoever.

Adjusted basis: An asset's basis can increase or decrease depending on changes that occur throughout its lifetime. For this reason, IRC § 1001(a) provides that computing gain requires determining the amount realized from the sale or disposition of property minus the adjusted basis. Capital improvements (such as adding a deck to your house) increase the asset's basis while depreciation deductions (statutory deductions that reduce the taxpayer's taxable income for a given year) diminish the asset's basis. Another way of viewing adjusted basis is to think of the asset as a savings account, with capital improvements representing deposits and depreciation deductions representing withdrawals.

== Mutual Fund Basis Methods ==
For mutual funds, there are 4 basis methods approved by the IRS, detailed in Publication 564:

Cost basis methods:

- Specific share identification
- First-in, first-out (FIFO)

Average basis methods:

- Average cost single category (ACSC)
- Average cost double category (ACDC)

Starting in Jan 2012, broker/dealers are required to track cost basis on covered shares (shares purchased on or after 1 Jan 2012) and are required by law to offer at least the following 3 basis methods:

- Specific share identification (Spec ID)
- First-in, first-out (FIFO)
- Average cost single category

The following other methods are now available to be used as well:

- Highest-in, first-out (HIFO)
- Min Tax
- Max Gain

== Reporting ==
Cost Basis Reporting is a term used in the financial services industry that refers to identifying the actual cost of a security for income tax purposes. Cost basis reporting became mandatory on January 1, 2011. The Emergency Economic Stabilization Act of 2008 – popularly known as the “bailout bill” – was signed into law on October 3, 2008, to address the 2008 financial crisis. The Act also had important cost basis ramifications, because Section 403 contained provisions that place significant cost basis-related requirements on brokers and other intermediaries who report their clients’ adjusted cost basis on IRS Form 1099.

Under the new legislation, financial intermediaries must report accurate adjusted cost basis information to both investors and the IRS for:

- Equities acquired on or after January 1, 2011
- Mutual fund and dividend reinvestment plan (DRiP) shares acquired on or after January 1, 2012.
- Financial instruments such as debt securities, options and private placements acquired on or after January 1, 2014

Additionally, an intermediary who transfers a client account to another intermediary must provide information necessary for cost basis reporting within 15 days of the account transfer. Financial intermediaries need to develop a compliance plan now, since penalties for non-compliance are stiff – up to $350,000 per year for incorrect Form 1099-B cost basis reporting, and unlimited penalties for intentional disregard of the new requirements.

Under the new law, taxpayers are also subject to penalties of up to $1,000 for underreporting capital gains taxes, and up to $5,000 for willful disregard of the law or reckless conduct in reporting capital gains taxes.

Note that these examples highlight selected aspects of the new legislation, and are not meant to provide a complete view of the compliance issues facing any specific organization.

== Evaluation of methods ==
Specific share identification is the most record and labor-intensive, as one must track all purchases and sales and specify which share was sold on which date. It almost always allows the lowest tax bill, however, as one has discretion on which gains to realize. Starting in 2012, the shares being sold must be identified at the time of the sale.

FIFO is the default method used for brokerage securities if no other is specified, and generally results in the highest tax bill, as it sells oldest (hence generally most appreciated) shares first.

Average cost single category is widely used by mutual funds, as it is the simplest in terms of record keeping (only total basis need be tracked) and sale (no specifying required), and results in moderate tax.

HIFO sells the shares with the highest cost first in an attempt to minimize the tax bill.

Min Tax sells shares in the following order: shares with short-term losses, long-term losses, long-term gains and lastly short-term gains.

Max Gain is the exact opposite of Min Tax.

== 2012 legislation changes ==
Shareholders are no longer required to petition the IRS to switch cost basis methods starting in 2012; however, to move into or out of average cost, the shareholder must do so in writing. The IRS considers in writing to be letters from the shareholder to their financial institution, changing methods online, or filling out a method election/change form from their financial institution. The IRS does not currently consider verbal permission on a recorded line as being "in writing."

Transfer agents and broker/dealers are now required by law to report the gains or losses of any sales of covered shares to the IRS. Institutions transferring covered shares to another institution must transfer the basis for those shares within 15 days of transfer. Because FIFO and Spec ID require a complete lot history, institutions must transfer and track full lot history and cannot transfer a "rolled up" total cost when transferring the cost basis to another institution. Several financial institutions will be participating in a Cost Basis Reporting System or CBRS to ease the transfer of cost basis between institutions but are not required by the IRS to do so.

== See also ==
- Tax basis
