= Tax basis =

Under U.S. federal tax law, the tax basis of an asset is generally its cost basis. Determining such cost may require allocations where multiple assets are acquired together. Tax basis may be reduced by allowances for depreciation. Such reduced basis is referred to as the adjusted tax basis. Adjusted tax basis is used in determining gain or loss from disposition of the asset. Tax basis may be relevant in other tax computations.

Tax basis of a member's interest in a partnership and other flow-through entity is generally increased by the members share of income and reduced by the share of loss. The tax basis of property acquired by gift is generally the basis of the person making the gift. Tax basis in property received from corporations or partnerships may be the corporation's or partnership's basis in some cases.

== Determining tax basis ==
The basis of property is generally the property's cost: the amount paid for the property in cash or other property. Holding period refers to the duration of time owned based on the purchase date.

Where an asset is purchased, tax basis generally includes cash paid plus liabilities assumed. For example, if Joe acquires a building for $10,000 cash and assumes a mortgage for $80,000 (which is his liability assumed), Joe's basis in the building is $90,000. If multiple items of property are acquired together in a single transaction, the tax basis must generally be allocated to the items in proportion to their values at the time of acquisition.

Fungible property (e.g., bushels of wheat or shares of corporation stock) may include items of property acquired at different times with differing bases. If such property is sold, the taxpayer may need to use an assumption (such as average cost or FIFO) for determining the cost of the portion of the property sold.

== Adjustments to basis ==
The tax basis of an asset subject to cost recovery must be reduced by deductions allowed for such cost recovery. For example, if Joe claimed $25,000 of depreciation deductions on his building, his adjusted basis would be the $90,000 as above less $25,000, or $65,000. Cost recovery deductions may include depreciation, amortization, and deducted losses or declines in value. Some jurisdictions (e.g., Germany) allow a deduction for decline in value of certain assets, which reduces tax basis.

== Partner's basis in partnership ==
A partner's tax basis in the partnership generally equals the adjusted basis of property contributed or cash paid plus any income recognized by the partner on the formation of the partnership, plus the partner's share of the liabilities of the partnership under 26 U.S.C. § 752. Such income may arise from services performed in exchange for the partnership interest. The member's basis is adjusted each year for his share of the entity's income or loss. Generally, the adjustment cannot reduce tax basis below zero. The member's basis is also reduced for distributions, and increased by the member's share of partnership income.

Under United States rules, a partner's tax basis is increased to the extent the partner's share of the liabilities of the partnership increases. The partner's tax basis is decreased to the extent the partner's share of partnership liabilities is considered to have decreased. For example, if Ann is a general partner of ABC partnership, Ann's tax basis in the partnership may be increased if the partnership borrows money. Special allocation rules for debt vary, depending on whether the debt is considered to be recourse or non-recourse to the partners in a partnership.

== Basis of gifts and inheritances ==
Tax basis of property received by a U.S. person by gift is the donor's tax basis of the property. If the fair market value of the property exceeded this tax basis and the donor paid gift tax, the tax basis is increased by the gift tax. This adjustment applies only if the recipient sells the property at a gain.

Tax basis of property acquired by inheritance (i.e., from a decedent) is the fair market value at the date of death. However, certain alternative basis amounts may be used at the election of the estate of the decedent. Property so acquired is treated as if acquired by gift, but the basis is limited to fair market value.

== Carryover and substituted basis ==
Property acquired in a non-taxable exchange takes the basis of the property exchanged. Examples of non-taxable exchanges include like kind exchanges, partnership liquidations, and corporate reorganizations.

Property acquired by distribution from a corporation or partnership may retain the same tax basis to the member as the entity's tax basis in certain circumstances. This basis is increased by any gain the member must recognize on the distribution.

== Other issues ==
Tax basis may be further adjusted for certain computations relating to controlled foreign corporations in the U.S.

== See also ==
- Partnership
- Capital gain
- Cost basis
