= Tax deferral =

Permitted delay of paying taxes

Tax deferral refers to instances where a taxpayer can delay paying taxes to some future period. In theory, the net taxes paid should be the same. Taxes can sometimes be deferred indefinitely, or may be taxed at a lower rate in the future, particularly for deferral of income taxes.

== Corporate tax deferral ==
Corporations (or other enterprises) may often be allowed to defer taxes, for example, by using accelerated depreciation. Profit taxes (or other taxes) are reduced in the current period by either lowering declared revenue now, or by increasing expenses. In principle, taxes in future periods should be higher.

== Income tax deferral ==
In many jurisdictions, income taxes may be deferred to future periods by a number of means. For example, income may be recognized in future years by using income tax deductions, or certain expenses may be provided as deductions in current rather than future periods. A 2010 study documents the large extent to which U.S. taxpayers accelerate their deductible state tax income taxes by prepaying them in December, instead of their normally due January of the following year. In jurisdictions where tax rates are progressive – meaning that income taxes as a percentage of income are higher for higher incomes or tax brackets, resulting in a higher marginal tax rate – this often results in lower taxes paid, regardless of the time value of money.

Tax-deferred retirement accounts exist in many jurisdictions, and allow individuals to declare income later in life; if the individuals also have lower income in retirement, taxes paid may be considerably lower. In Canada, contributions to registered retirement savings plans or RRSPs are deducted from income, and earnings (interest, dividends and capital gains) in these accounts are not taxed; only withdrawals from the retirement account are taxed as income.

Other types of retirement accounts will defer taxes only on income earned in the account. In the United States, a number of different forms of retirement savings accounts exist with different characteristics and limits, including 401ks, IRAs, and more.

As long as the individual makes withdrawals when he or she is in a lower tax bracket (that is, has a lower marginal tax rate), total taxes payable will be lower.

On the other hand, some people (primarily business owners) may choose to do the opposite of deferring their tax liabilities by "prepaying" personal income tax that would otherwise be payable in future years. For example, if it is known that tax rates will be increasing in a future tax year, a business owner can reduce his total tax liability by paying himself/herself a higher salary and/or bonuses in the current tax year, even if he or she has to loan the business money to do so. In most jurisdictions, the principal of such loans can be collected by the owner tax free at any time, thus allowing the owner to be paid a lower salary than would otherwise be the case once the tax rate increases. Alternatively, the owner of a new or struggling business can be paid a higher salary than his or her company can nominally afford to pay in hopes that when the business is more profitable, the amount of taxes owing in higher tax brackets will be less or none at all. At the very least, it is usually advisable for business owners to at least pay themselves enough salary to use up all of their basic personal exemptions for a given tax year, since these exemptions typically cannot be deferred to a future tax year. However, if applied aggressively, this can be a risky strategy depending on the jurisdiction – if the business fails, the owners' ability to benefit from the nominal write-offs and losses accrued in earlier years might be limited or non-existent.

== International tax deferral ==
Taxes on profits derived from foreign investments may also be deferred via the retention and reinvestment of corporate earnings in foreign lower-tax countries. The advantages of this kind of tax deferral can be attributed to two partially interdependent effects, the tax rate effect and the interest effect:

The tax rate effect is based on the fact that as long as the profit of a (supposed) subsidiary is not distributed to the domestic (corporate or individual) shareholder, the profit is not taxed in the shareholder's country. If the foreign tax rate is lower than the domestic one, profits can thus be retained in order to shelter them from domestic taxation. In case of exemption of foreign profits (as it is e.g. the case for corporate shareholders in Germany), this tax rate advantage is final.

The interest effect derives from the fact that if the foreign tax rate is low, the tax rate effect on the net yield is growing with time as the amount of additional interest increases exponentially (interest advantage). Therefore, given equal gross yields, e.g. regarding mobile financial assets, it is more profitable to invest in low-tax countries: The net yield is higher in a low-tax country than in a high-tax country and hence the capital grows at a faster rate. That interest effect cannot be wholly eliminated, even if there is additional taxation upon distribution (e.g. like in a shareholder relief system or with the credit method).

== Property tax deferral ==
Paying property taxes can be a significant expense for homeowners, especially for seniors living on a fixed income. However, numerous states have initiatives where senior homeowners who meet specific requirements can delay their property tax payments for as long as they continue to reside in their home. By lowering their taxes at the beginning, these programs allow seniors to have additional funds that can be used for different expenses, thereby creating a constant source of revenue that is comparable to an annuity. The deferred taxes must eventually be repaid with interest which can vary by state, either when the homeowner sells the property or passes away. Therefore, the program does not have any long-term cost for states or localities.

=== Retirement income problem in the USA ===
A significant number of retired individuals may not have enough income to sustain their lifestyle after retirement. To determine the ability of households to maintain their pre-retirement consumption levels after retirement, the National Retirement Risk Index (NRRI) uses projected replacement rates, which indicate the percentage of pre-retirement earnings in benefits. The data from the Federal Reserve's Survey of Consumer Finances (SCF) is used to derive the NRRI. The current NRRI estimate indicates that approximately half of working-age households are at risk of not being able to maintain their standard of living after retirement. Although households in the bottom third of the income distribution range face a higher risk, those in the middle and top of the income range also face significant risks. This indicates that the problem is widespread.

The shortfall in retirement income is due to two main reasons: firstly, future generations, including the Baby Boomers, will require more retirement resources. Secondly, traditional sources of retirement income, which previously provided significant support, are now offering less assistance.

Regarding the factors driving the need for retirement resources, longer life expectancies, coupled with early retirement ages, increasing healthcare expenses, and exceptionally low interest rates are the primary drivers. Consequently, people need to accumulate significantly more retirement resources than in the past.

In terms of income sources, social security will provide less benefit relative to pre-retirement earnings, as the full retirement age has increased from 65 to 67. Moreover, higher Medicare premiums and increased social security benefit taxation for more households will decrease net benefits. Additionally, the program is facing a 75-year deficit, and to restore balance, additional benefit reductions may be necessary.

The private retirement system, which is the other primary source of retirement income, is not functioning effectively for a large portion of the population. This is primarily due to the absence of universal coverage, resulting in numerous households having no other source of retirement income apart from social security. Even for those households with retirement plans, the balances are frequently inadequate.

The Gerontology Institute at the University of Massachusetts-Boston assesses the Elder Economic Insecurity Rate for each state. This rate indicates the proportion of individuals and couples who don't earn enough to meet their basic living expenses. According to the institute's latest report, seven out of the top ten states with the highest Elder Economic Insecurity Rates have high property taxes. This implies that despite being high-income states like Massachusetts, New York, New Jersey, and California, they have similar rates of elderly people at risk compared to low-income states such as Mississippi, Maine, and Louisiana.

=== Currently Available Arrangements Regarding Property Taxes Deferrals in the USA ===
At present, 24 states provide certain senior citizens with the option to postpone paying all their property taxes until their home is sold or they pass away. The qualifications for this opportunity are dependent on factors such as age, residency, income, and property value. Although the state establishes the guidelines for these programs, local governments generally manage them and can modify the eligibility criteria and interest rates. Typically, homeowners who are 65 or older and have an annual household income below $20,000 are qualified. The standard interest rate applied to deferred property taxes is roughly 6%. However, the essential components of these programs vary significantly among states and municipalities.

Massachusetts illustrates how states attempt to ease the financial burden of homeownership for elderly residents by offering three property tax relief programs. Two of these programs are transfer or welfare-based initiatives. The Circuit Breaker Tax Credit is managed by the state government, offering a credit against the state income tax to individuals who are 65 or older and own or rent residential property in Massachusetts. This credit is calculated by the excess of the combined payment for real estate taxes and half of the water and sewer bills over 10% of the taxpayer's income. The highest credit that can be obtained is $1,130. However, the credit amount is subject to restrictions based on the taxpayer's total income and the assessed value of the real estate. This program costs approximately $80 million annually. The second program is Senior Property Tax Exemptions, administered at the local level, and grants a $500 exemption on the property tax bill for individuals aged 70 or older who satisfy certain ownership, residency, income, and asset criteria. Municipalities that bear the expense of this exemption have the option to raise the exempt amount to $1,000 and reduce the qualifying age to 65. In 2019, these municipalities granted about $10 million in property tax exemptions.

Under the Senior Property Tax Deferral program, which is the third program available, local governments are given the authority to authorize select seniors to postpone the payment of their property taxes and reclaim them with interest when the homeowner either sells the property or passes away. While the state determines the program's guidelines, it also grants some room for localities to make adjustments. To illustrate, the program sets the highest gross income threshold at $20,000, but local administrations have the option to increase it to $60,000, which is the Circuit Breaker limit for a single non-head of household. In the same way, the interest rate ceiling is set by the state at 8%, but localities can opt for a lower rate. The amount of money that can be claimed against the property as a lien should not go beyond 50% of the estimated market value. When the homeowner sells the property or passes away, they must pay back the deferred taxes and interest within six months, with interest accumulating at a rate of 16% during this period.

== See also ==
- Companies of the United States with untaxed profits
- Individual Retirement Account
- Deferred compensation
- 401k
