= FATCA agreement between Canada and the United States =

Tax agreement

Canada–United States Enhanced Tax Information Exchange Agreement
Agreement Between the Government of the United States of America and the Government of Canada to Improve International Tax Compliance through Enhanced Exchange of Information under the Convention Between the United States of America and Canada with Respect to Taxes on Income and on Capital.
- Signed: 5 February 2014
- Location: Ottawa, Canada
- Effective: 27 June 2014
- Condition: Notification of Canada it has completed its internal procedures
- Signatories: Canada; United States
- Languages: English and French

The FATCA agreement is an international agreement signed between Canada and the United States that allows the implementation of the Foreign Account Tax Compliance Act (an Act of the U.S. Congress) in Canada. It is one of 30 intergovernmental agreements the US has concluded with other countries to implement the FATCA.

FATCA requires United States persons, including individuals who live outside the United States, and financial institutions outside the United States, to report the principal amount held in their financial accounts outside of the United States to the Internal Revenue Service (IRS).

According to the Canadian Broadcasting Corporation (CBC) there are about one million American citizens living in Canada. This treaty also affects their spouses, children, or anyone with whom they own property, share a business connection, or hold a joint financial account.

The agreement exempts Tax-Free Savings Accounts, Registered Disability Savings Plans and Registered Education Savings Plans.

Canadian banks say they expect compliance costs to be "enormous".

According to Bloomberg, Revenue Canada minister Kerry-Lynne Findlay promised that this treaty will not impose any U.S. taxes or penalties on people holding accounts in Canada.

== October 2013 Financial Post report ==
While anticipating the agreement but before it was signed, Scotia Bank, one of Canada's large banks, spent almost $100 million, implementing a system to report to the United States the account holdings of Canadians of American origin, and their Canadian born spouses in order to comply with FATCA. According to the Financial Post FATCA requires Canadian banks to provide information to the United States including total assets, account balances, account numbers, transactions and more, and includes assets held jointly with Canadian-born spouses and other family members.

== CTV January 2014 report ==
In January 2014 CTV Television Network reported that Allison Christians, the H. Howard Stikeman Chair in Tax Law at McGill University, said that the Foreign Account Tax Compliance Act could impact all Canadians. "The way the U.S. law is written, financial institutions around the world have an obligation to ensure that any accounts that are held by American people with U.S. status, that information about that account is given to IRS...." Allison Christians collaborated with Queens University professor Arthur Cockfield on another paper on this topic.

FATCA requires Canadian banks to identify and supply the financial information of anyone considered to be a U.S. person to the IRS. FATCA may affect Canadians with no ties to the U.S. Christians says that financial institutions face high costs to implement the new rules, and that all customers will face higher banking costs typically passed on to clients in the form of higher fees and charges.

== Financial Post March 2014 report ==
On March 26, 2014 Julius Melnitzer wrote in the Financial Post that FATCA requires foreign financial institutions to report the financial activities of their American clients to the Internal Revenue Service and to withhold funds in appropriate circumstances. However the Isaac Brock Society leaked documents from CRA's guidance notes that suggest that the Canadian federal government and Canada Revenue Agency (CRA) have undermined the intergovernmental agreement (IGA) with the U.S. which is aimed at catching American tax evaders living in Canada. It is alleged that Finance Canada and CRA "intended to drastically depart" from key definitions found in the IGA and FATCA, and that CRA's interpretation of the draft legislation is "significantly different" from OECD guidance.

For instance, CRA's guidance suggests that a place of birth is only unambiguous if an account holder lists it as "New York, New York, USA" but not if it is listed as "New York, New York."

== Litigation ==
Two American-Canadian dual citizens living in Canada, Virginia Hillis and Gwendolyn Louise Deegan, sued the Canadian government (specifically the Attorney General of Canada and the Minister of National Revenue) in 2014 in the Federal Court of Canada, claiming (among other things) that the intergovernmental U.S.-Canadian agreement that implements FATCA violates the Canadian Charter of Rights and Freedoms, particularly the provisions related to discrimination on the basis of citizenship or national origin. The suit was prepared by a group called the Alliance for the Defence of Canadian Sovereignty (ADCS). In 2015, the Federal Court of Canada dismissed the suit, upholding the intergovernmental agreement. The Federal Court also rejected the claims in 2019, although a further appeal to the Federal Court of Appeal may follow.

== See also ==
- American Australians
- American Brazilians
- American Canadians
- American Citizens Abroad
  - Americans in Cuba
  - Americans in North Korea
  - Americans in the Philippines
  - Americans in the United Kingdom
- American diaspora
- American Mexicans
- Australian Americans
- Common Reporting Standard
- Emigration from the United States
- European Union withholding tax
- Extraterritorial jurisdiction
- Immigration to the United States
- International taxation of Americans
- Relinquishment of United States nationality
- Taxation of non resident Americans
- Taxation of United States persons
- U.S. Legislation
