= Accidental American =

Legal citizen with limited US connection

An accidental American is someone whom U.S. law deems to be an American citizen, but who has only a tenuous connection with that country. For example, American nationality law provides (with limited exceptions) that anyone born on U.S. territory is a U.S. citizen (jus soli), including those who leave as infants or young children, even if neither parent is a U.S. citizen (as in the case of Boris Johnson until he renounced his U.S. citizenship in 2016). U.S. law also ascribes American citizenship to some children born abroad to a U.S. citizen parent (jus sanguinis), even if those children never enter the United States.

Since the early 2000s, the term "accidental American" has been adopted by several activist groups to protest tax treaties and Inter-Governmental Agreements which treat such people as American citizens who are therefore potentially subject to tax and financial reporting (e.g. FATCA and FBAR) requirements – requirements which few other countries impose on their nonresident citizens. Accidental Americans may be unaware of these requirements, or their U.S. citizen status, until they encounter problems accessing bank services in their home countries, for example, or are barred from entering the U.S. on a non-U.S. passport. Furthermore, the U.S. State Department now charges US$450 to renounce citizenship (or otherwise obtain a Certificate of Loss of Nationality), while tax reporting requirements associated with legal expatriation may pose additional financial burdens.

== Nationality law ==
U.S. nationality law provides for both jus soli and jus sanguinis (see 8 U.S.C. § 1401), as well as derivative citizenship upon the naturalization of a parent (8 U.S.C. §§ 1431–1433).

=== Birth or parental naturalization in the United States ===
Children born in the United States are U.S. citizens, regardless of their parents' citizenship or immigration status or whether the family lives in the United States after the child is born; the only exception recognized under current law is for children born to foreign diplomats. Many babies who grew up in towns along the Canada–United States border were born in a hospital on the opposite side of the border and thus acquired the citizenship of the other country this way. Also, when an immigrant to the U.S. becomes a naturalized citizen, under the Child Citizenship Act of 2000, the immigrant's minor children become U.S. citizens along with their parent as long as they are living in the U.S. as lawful permanent residents at the time of the parent's naturalization or later enter the U.S. under LPR status in their minority.

In each of these cases, the child becomes a U.S. citizen automatically, without any choice in the matter. Mumbai tax lawyer Poorvi Chothani stated that many Indians living in the U.S. on work visas "eagerly obtain U.S. citizenship" for their children but "do not even examine the long-term implications of this", and that she even has a client who is suing his own father for the reason of such an unwanted U.S. citizenship.

=== Birth abroad and role of registration ===
U.S. law also states that a child born outside of the United States to a U.S. citizen parent who previously spent sufficient time in the U.S. is a U.S. citizen at birth, regardless of whether the child also has the citizenship of the country of birth or another citizenship. U.S. citizens married to fellow U.S. citizens can transmit U.S. citizenship to their children if either parent has ever had a residence in the United States (without any minimum time limitation on how long they held that residence.) However, for U.S. citizens married to non-U.S. citizens, the required period of residence is longer; under the Nationality Act of 1940 and the Immigration and Nationality Act of 1952, the required period of residence was set to ten years, five of which had to be after the age of 14. The Immigration and Nationality Act Amendments of 1986 reduced this to five years, two of which had to be after the age of 14.

This makes it possible in some cases for "accidental American" status to be passed down over multiple generations, for example if an accidental American spends sufficient time in the U.S. to meet the physical presence requirements to pass down their U.S. citizenship to their own children born outside of the United States. Previously, this had been most likely to occur in the case of the child of an unmarried U.S. citizen mother and non-American father. Under 8 U.S.C. § 1409(c), only one year of continuous physical presence in the United States is required for an unmarried mother to pass down citizenship to children born abroad. However, in 2017 the Supreme Court struck down the distinction between unmarried mothers and unmarried fathers as a violation of the Equal Protection Clause (resolving an earlier split between the Second and Ninth Circuits), holding instead that all American parents married to non-Americans should be required to meet the same longer five-year standard of residence to pass citizenship to their children.

Under a strict reading of U.S. nationality law, consular registration is not required in order for a child born outside of the U.S. to a qualifying parent to "become" a U.S. citizen; the child is a U.S. citizen from the moment of birth. However, for practical reasons, if a child's birth is not reported to a U.S. consulate or United States Citizenship and Immigration Services, the child would not have any proof of U.S. citizenship and the U.S. government might remain unaware of the child's citizenship status. Retired U.S. State Department official Andrew Grossman wrote in 2007 that in cases of "doubtful nationality" in which a child's derivative U.S. citizenship remained undocumented and unreported to the U.S. government, the child was not regarded as a U.S. citizen either for tax or other purposes, and he expected that it would be quite difficult for tax authorities to make determinations of jus sanguinis citizenship on their own.

Karen Christensen, also of the U.S. State Department (Deputy Assistant Secretary for Overseas Citizens Services, Bureau of Consular Affairs), stated that "it is the process of being documented as a U.S. citizen that would result in official government recognition of the child’s U.S. citizenship status". This ambiguity has resulted in American emigrant parents, particularly those married to people of other nationalities, choosing not to report the births of their children born in other countries to U.S. consulates, in the hopes that this would allow the children to escape notice by the U.S. government. Mark Matthews of Caplin & Drysdale stated, "When clients who have lived abroad for years come in, concerned about whether they have an obligation under FATCA, they sometimes react to the suggestion that their kids might be American the way one might react to a horrible medical diagnosis."

=== Retroactive restoration of citizenship ===
Retroactive restoration of U.S. citizenship previously lost might occur when a statute regarding loss of U.S. citizenship is declared unconstitutional. The issue ultimately arises from the fact that obtaining a Certificate of Loss of Nationality (CLN) has never been necessary under U.S. nationality law to trigger loss of citizenship, but is merely a document which confirms the loss of citizenship caused by an earlier act. In earlier years, an unknown number of people who lost U.S. citizenship according to contemporary law simply ceased to exercise the benefits of U.S. citizenship (for example, no longer voting, letting their U.S. passport expire) and began identifying themselves to the U.S. government as foreigners (for example, by using foreign passports to enter the United States) without obtaining a CLN. Additionally, the U.S. government has asserted that even a person who has been issued a CLN, but under a provision of law later found unconstitutional, remains a U.S. citizen all along. In 1998, the State Department estimated that there were several thousand individuals of this latter type, who had never contacted the U.S. government seeking to have their CLNs vacated.

One early case causing retroactive restoration of citizenship was Schneider v. Rusk (1964). In that case, the Supreme Court considered 8 U.S.C. § 1482, which provided for loss of U.S. citizenship by a naturalized citizen taking up residence in a country of which they had previously been a citizen. The Court found that the statute unconstitutionally discriminated between native-born and naturalized citizens. This ruling protected plaintiff-appellee Angelika Schneider from unwanted loss of her U.S. citizenship, against which she had protested by taking her case to the Supreme Court. However, in the aftermath the U.S. government took the position that all persons who had lost U.S. citizenship under Section 1482 should be treated as never having lost citizenship, regardless of whether they made a subsequent claim to the benefits of U.S. citizenship, were ignorant of their restored citizenship, or were even unwilling to have it restored.

A more complicated situation arose from Vance v. Terrazas (1980). In that case, the Supreme Court considered 8 U.S.C. § 1481(a), providing that U.S. citizens could expatriate themselves by performing certain acts involving citizenship or allegiance to a foreign country, including swearing an oath of allegiance to a foreign country. The State Department at the time argued that those acts themselves constituted evidence of intent to give up citizenship, but the Court disagreed and required that the intent be proven by the party asserting the loss of citizenship through the preponderance of the evidence, encompassing not only the act itself but the individual's other statements and conduct. Again, this ruling protected the individual involved, who asserted his citizenship against State Department efforts to demonstrate that he had relinquished it. However, this effectively imposed a new requirement on other people, without notification to them and without regard to whether they preferred to be U.S. citizens: before they only had to commit the act to relinquish U.S. citizenship, but afterwards if they sought to obtain a CLN, they had the affirmative burden of proving intent contemporary with the act, otherwise the U.S. government would deem them to have been U.S. citizens all along.

The issue of retroactive restoration of citizenship interacts with birth abroad as mentioned above, in that children born during a period in which the parent believed themself not to be a U.S. citizen might themselves be regarded as citizens at birth due to a retroactive restoration of the parent's citizenship to the year in which the child was born.

== Awareness of U.S. citizenship ==
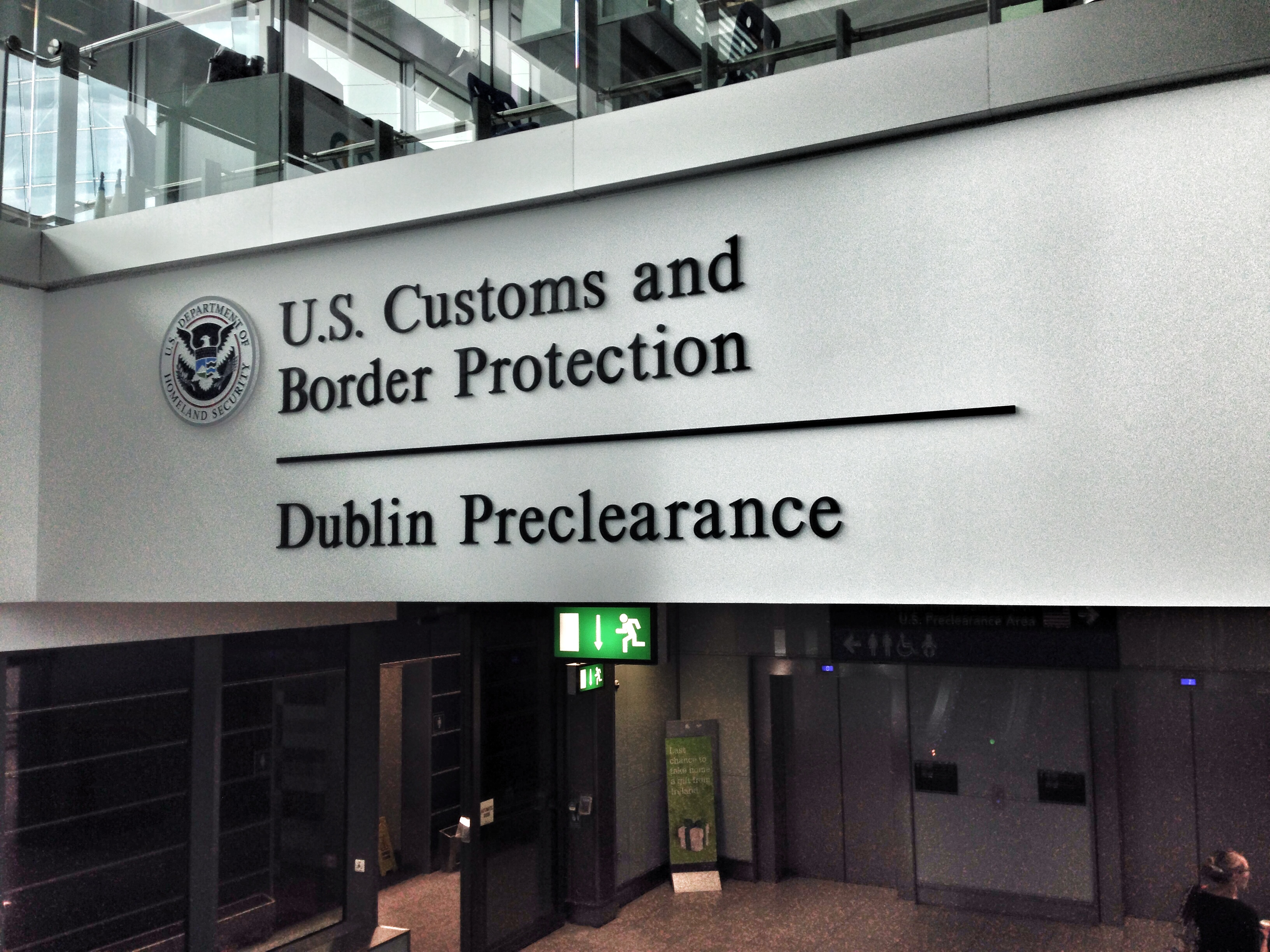
Preclearance screening by U.S. Customs and Border Protection officers stationed overseas may reveal that a traveller with a non-U.S. passport has a U.S. birthplace, leading to questions over the traveller's citizenship.

Accidental Americans may become aware in various ways that the United States considers them to be its citizens.

First, accidental Americans born in the United States may encounter difficulties when attempting to enter the U.S. on a non-U.S. passport, as U.S. law (8 U.S.C. § 1185(b)) requires all U.S. citizens to use U.S. passports when entering the country. An airline employee who notes the U.S. place of birth in the passport might refuse to allow the person to board a flight. Famously, former Prime Minister of the United Kingdom, Boris Johnson was denied boarding on a flight which transited the U.S. in 2006, after which he first claimed that he wanted to renounce his U.S. citizenship, but instead applied for a U.S. passport some years later. In the past, Canadians were unlikely to encounter such difficulties, because passports were not required to cross the Canada–United States border, but in the aftermath of the September 11, 2001 attacks, the Western Hemisphere Travel Initiative tightened documentary requirements for entering the United States by land or by sea, and so Canadians crossing into the United States had to show proof of Canadian citizenship; if they used a Canadian passport as such proof, it would indicate their place of birth.

Furthermore, in the aftermath of the 2009 UBS tax evasion controversy, the U.S. government began concerted efforts to identify U.S. citizens who held non-U.S. financial accounts. A major limb of this effort was the Foreign Account Tax Compliance Act (FATCA), passed in 2010, which imposed additional taxes on the U.S. income of non-U.S. banks which did not sign an agreement with the IRS to collect information about their customers' citizenships and to provide the IRS with any information on customers identified as having "U.S. indicia", including a U.S. place of birth. Following FATCA's passage, many banks began inquiring into the birthplaces and parentage of their customers, raising awareness among accidental Americans that the U.S. government might consider them to be citizens. FATCA also resulted in closures of bank accounts belonging to people identified as U.S. citizens; a 2014 survey of U.S. citizens in other countries by Democrats Abroad found that 12.7% of respondents had been denied financial services by their banks.

Often, banks requested CLNs from customers born in the United States who asserted they were not U.S. citizens, leading to difficulties both for customers who had been U.S. citizens all along without knowing it, and for those whose U.S. citizenship had been restored retroactively without their knowledge. Allison Christians of McGill University noted that whether or not the IRS is interested in pursuing non-wealthy accidental Americans, banks had been known to "overreact" to customers' potential ties to the United States, due to the banks' own fears of IRS penalties for errors.

== Tax consequences ==
=== Taxation of non-residents ===
Systems of taxation on personal income No income tax Territorial Residential Citizenship-based

Like the United States, many other countries have laws for transmission of citizenship by descent, but those countries impose tax filing obligations only on people who reside or earn income in those countries; as of 2011, the United States and Eritrea were the only countries which impose taxation and reporting requirements on the income which citizens living abroad permanently earn in their countries of residence. Despite their lack of personal or business ties to the United States, accidental Americans have the same U.S. tax filing and payment obligations as do self-identifying "Americans abroad" who are aware of their U.S. citizenship status, and are subject to the same fines for failure to file. Tax treaties generally do not serve to mitigate the double taxation and filing burdens such people face, as all U.S. tax treaties give the U.S. the power to tax U.S. citizens residing in other countries as if the treaty did not exist; such treaties generally only benefit business entities and dual-resident non-U.S. citizens. The result, as tax attorney Gavin Leckie put it, is that "people who have no sense of being American find themselves caught up in a maze of rules really aimed at the U.S. resident citizen seeking to defer or evade U.S. taxes by holding assets offshore".

People who once had U.S. permanent residence status ("green card holders") may also face similar tax issues as accidental citizens, combined with similar unawareness of their status. Green card holders generally have the same U.S. tax filing obligations as U.S. citizens, regardless of their actual residence. Many green card holders later emigrated from the U.S. and let their green cards expire, believing that since they were no longer entitled under immigration law to live in the U.S., they also correspondingly had no further tax obligations. However, 26 U.S.C. § 7701(n) provides that a green card holder's tax obligations do not end until a formal administrative or judicial determination of abandonment of U.S. residence; this generally requires the green card holder not just to move out of the United States, but to file Form I-407 with United States Citizenship and Immigration Services. About eighteen thousand people per year file this form, but it is likely that many more green card holders moving out of the U.S. are unaware that this procedure is required.

=== Filing and compliance difficulties ===
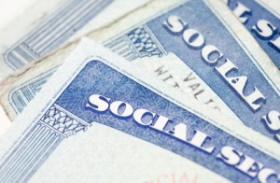
Accidental Americans have faced difficulty obtaining Social Security numbers, which U.S. citizens must possess in order to file taxes with the Internal Revenue Service.

The Internal Revenue Code provides for a foreign earned income exclusion allowing non-resident U.S. tax filers to exclude wage income up to a certain threshold ($99,400 for the 2013 tax filing season) from U.S. taxation, as well as credits for taxes paid to other countries. The result is that accidental Americans often do not owe U.S. income tax, but must spend thousands of dollars in accounting fees to prove that fact, and face potential fines of tens of thousands of dollars for paperwork errors. The reason is that the foreign earned income exclusion does not affect filing obligations nor the treatment of non-U.S bank accounts and investment plans.

Tax lawyers state that compliance with the foreign trust and passive foreign investment company rules can be particularly onerous, because their definitions are so broad as to include mutual funds, retirement accounts, and similar such structures owned by accidental Americans in their country of residence; people with savings in these kinds of plans will face higher taxes and compliance burdens than U.S. residents who keep money in similar U.S. investment plans. Those who have spent their lives planning for their retirement without considering the U.S. tax consequences of the non-U.S. financial instruments they hold may find that U.S. taxation, in particular PFIC taxation, wipes out most of their returns on investments; as Allison Christians states, "the PFIC regime is designed to be so harsh that no one would ever knowingly own one unless they were treating it like a partnership, and marking it to market annually with the assistance of sophisticated tax counsel".

Even Canada's Registered Disability Savings Plan (RDSP) falls under U.S. foreign trust reporting requirements. RDSPs and other registered Canadian accounts for education and retirement savings are exempt from FATCA reporting by banks under the FATCA agreement between Canada and the United States, but this agreement does not relieve the U.S. individual income taxes owed on such plans, nor the individual owner's obligation to file the non-FATCA-related trust or PFIC forms. Under the 2011 Offshore Voluntary Disclosure Initiative, people residing outside of the U.S. who stated that they did not file U.S. tax and asset-reporting forms because they were unaware of their U.S. citizenship faced fines of 5% of their assets.

In many cases, it has also proven difficult for accidental Americans born abroad to obtain Social Security numbers (SSNs), which are required for them to file U.S. taxes. In response to this issue, the State Bar of California's Taxation Section issued a proposal in 2015 for the IRS to allow Americans citizens without SSNs residing in other countries to obtain Individual Taxpayer Identification Numbers (ITINs) instead. Current regulations (26 CFR 301.6109) require all U.S. citizens to use SSNs as their Taxpayer Identification Number, while ITINs are only available to non-citizens; however, the underlying statute (26 U.S.C. § 6109) does not require this, and so the California Bar suggested that their proposal could be accomplished by issuing new Treasury regulations without needing to wait for Congress to pass any new legislation.

=== Non-compliance ===
While FATCA certainly raised awareness of U.S. tax filing obligations among accidental Americans, overall compliance in the years after 2010 has remained low. Rough estimates (based on State Department figures for the number of U.S. persons abroad, plus IRS data for claims of the Foreign Earned Income Exemption and Foreign Tax Credit) suggest that overall compliance rates are approximately 10 to 15 percent. Furthermore, the IRS has extremely limited ability to penalize accidental Americans for failure to file, provided they have no U.S. assets or income sources. The IRS has mutual assistance in collection agreements with only five countries (Canada, Denmark, France, Netherlands, Sweden) but those agreements specifically exclude a country's own citizens, thus protecting dual citizens living in their home country. FBAR penalties are not covered by these agreements, and remain fully uncollected outside the U.S. Beyond FATCA data (year-end balance and interest/dividend income for reportable accounts only) the IRS receives no information about the income or assets of accidental Americans who fail to file U.S. tax returns. And even then, according to Treasury audit report from April 2022, the IRS does not have the resources to use FATCA data to locate or pursue accidental Americans who do not voluntarily enter the U.S. tax system.

== Amateur radio ==
A U.S. citizen who intends to operate an amateur radio within the United States must be licensed in the U.S., even if the citizen is licensed in a country with reciprocal arrangements.

== Giving up U.S. citizenship ==
=== Overview ===
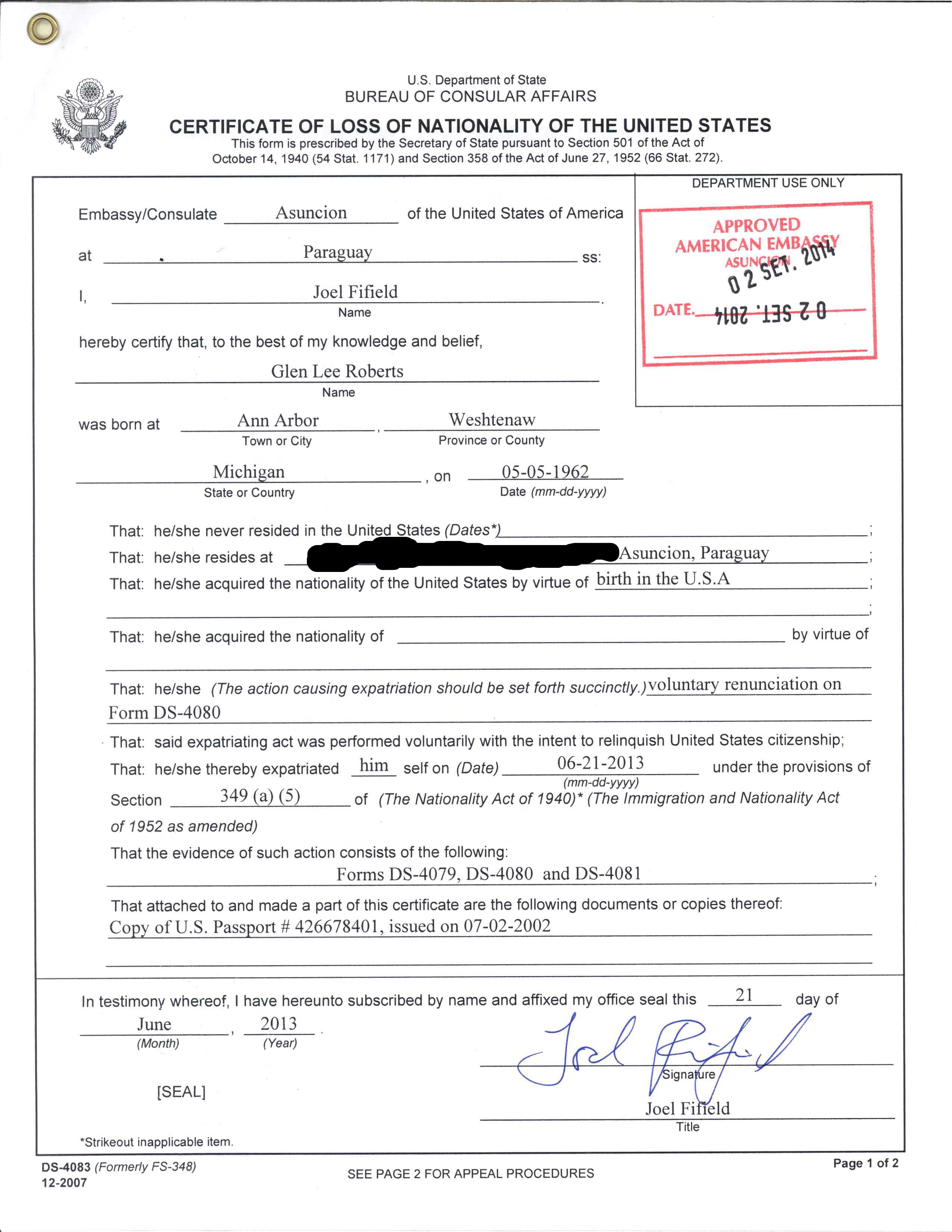
A U.S. citizen who voluntarily performed an act specified in 8 U.S.C. § 1481(a) may declare to a U.S. consulate that they intended to relinquish U.S. citizenship through that act and obtain a Certificate of Loss of Nationality (pictured) documenting that fact.

Accidental Americans who become aware of their U.S. citizenship status have the option of looking into ways of renouncing or relinquishing it. Although it is possible for children to acquire U.S. citizenship "accidentally" without any voluntary action on their part, under current law they cannot lose that citizenship status accidentally or automatically as adults; instead, they must take voluntary action to give it up. United States nationality law (8 U.S.C. § 1482) formerly provided for automatic loss of U.S. citizenship by dual citizens resident abroad, but this was repealed by the Immigration and Nationality Act Amendments of 1978 (Pub. L. 95–432; 92 Stat. 1046).

The Quarterly Publication of Individuals Who Have Chosen to Expatriate, which lists names of certain people with respect to whom the IRS received information on loss of citizenship during the quarter in question, in 2011 began showing a sharp rise in the number of names included. Lawyers disagree whether the Quarterly Publication is a complete list of all people giving up U.S. citizenship, or whether it only includes covered expatriates (people with certain levels of assets, tax liabilities, or tax filing or payment deficiencies). Regardless, various U.S. lawyers have commented, based on their experiences with clients, that the majority of the early 2010s increase in renunciations of U.S. citizenship is probably attributable to accidental Americans, rather than the popular stereotype of wealthy people who move to a tax haven after becoming rich in the United States.

As a practical matter, renunciation of U.S. citizenship became markedly more difficult in 2014, meaning that even accidental Americans who were aware of their U.S. citizenship status and wanted to rid themselves of it faced obstacles: in addition to the cost of possible tax filings with the IRS, the State Department raised the fee for renunciation to US$2,350, roughly twenty times the fee charged by other high-income countries, and wait times for renunciation appointments at some U.S consulates grew to ten months or longer.

=== Expatriation tax ===
The Internal Revenue Code imposes an expatriation tax on people giving up U.S. citizenship. Payment of the tax is not a prerequisite to giving up citizenship; rather, the tax and its associated reporting forms are paid and filed during the following year, on the normal tax return due date. People who had both U.S. and another citizenship at birth, reside in their country of other citizenship, and have not been U.S. residents in more than 10 of the past 15 tax years, may be exempt from this tax (26 U.S.C. § 877(a)(2)(c)); this provides a potential exception for some accidental Americans. However, this exception only applies to those who can state, under penalty of perjury, that they have fulfilled all of their U.S. tax filing and payment requirements for the preceding five years, and people who were not aware of their status as U.S. citizens are unlikely to have made the required filings and payments. Furthermore, accidental Americans who do not reside in their country of other citizenship but rather a third country, for example due to work or family ties there, cannot qualify for this expatriation tax exemption either.

In the late 1990s, the newly tightened U.S. expatriation tax system allowed individuals who would otherwise be subject to the tax to apply for a private letter ruling (PLR) that their termination of U.S. citizenship was not tax-motivated. (The American Jobs Creation Act of 2004 terminated the PLR exception to the expatriation tax.) The very first such PLR request came from a British citizen who stated that he was unaware of his U.S. citizenship; Willard Yates, a retired tax attorney then with the IRS' Office of Associate Chief Council (International) who handled that PLR request, initially expressed disbelief at the possibility that anyone could be unaware of their U.S. citizenship, but states that later, "after working a bunch of 877 PLRs, I realized we didn’t know anything about anything when it came to U.S. citizens working overseas, accidental or otherwise."

=== Tax obligations and non-compliance ===
Tax compliance is not required for renunciation of U.S. citizenship, but only to formally exit the U.S. tax system after expatriation. Consular officials will not inquire about a person's tax status during the renunciation interview, nor is a potential renunciant required to supply a Social Security Number at any point during the process. The common but mistaken belief that tax compliance is required prior to renunciation is encouraged by the U.S. tax preparation industry, often at great cost to unsuspecting accidental Americans. It appears, however, that a significant number of former U.S. citizens have renounced without any attempt at tax compliance. First, in response to political pressure from EU governments due to the loss of banking privileges by accidental Americans, the IRS created a "relief procedure for certain former citizens" in 2019 to encourage compliance among those who had renounced without filing; this program allowed one to file without a Social Security Number, and waived up to US$25,000 per year in taxes owing.

Second, according to a Treasury audit in 2020, over 40 percent of those renouncing U.S. citizenship do not file Form 8854 to make a formal exit from the U.S. tax system after expatriation, and the IRS lacks the resources to contact any of these former citizens, even those who potentially owed an exit tax. An accidental American without U.S. assets or income sources can simply renounce U.S. citizenship to obtain their Certificate of Loss of Nationality (thus ending any FATCA reporting and restrictions on banking or investment services) without entering the U.S. tax system and potentially facing both costs for preparation of tax returns, and possible taxes owing.

== Proposed remedies ==
President Barack Obama's proposed United States federal budget for 2016 included provisions to exempt certain accidental Americans from both the payment of U.S. tax on non-U.S. source income, and the expatriation tax, if they gave up U.S. citizenship within two years from the time they became aware of it. The proposal was limited to those who had been dual citizens at birth, had maintained citizenship of a foreign country since birth, had not lived in the United States since age 18½, and had only held a United States passport in order to depart from the United States in compliance with 22 CFR 53.1. The Congressional Budget Office estimated that this proposal would cost the United States roughly $403 million in tax revenue over the following ten years, with the majority ($208 million) of the revenue loss occurring in the first three years.

Temple University law professor Peter Spiro described this as possible evidence that the U.S. government was beginning to conclude "that the imposition of U.S. taxes on accidental Americans is unsustainable." Roy A. Berg of tax law firm Moodys Gartner believed that the proposal had little chance of being passed by Congress, but that the executive branch might be able to implement similar relief solely through regulatory amendments.

== See also ==
- Panama Canal Zone#Citizenship
