= Savings Directive =

Directive 2003/48/EC
- European Union directive
- Title: Council Directive on taxation of savings income in the form of interest payments
- Made by: Council of the EU
- Made under: Art. 94
- Journal reference: L 157, 2003-06-26, p. 38

History
- Date made: 2003-06-03
- Entry into force: 2005-07-01

Preparative texts
- Commission proposal: C 270 E, 2001-09-25, p. 259
- EESC opinion: C 48, 2002-02-21, p. 55
- EP opinion: C 47 E, 2003-02-27, p. 553

Other legislation
- Replaced by: Directive 2014/107/EU

The European Union Savings Directive (EUSD), formally Council Directive 2003/48/EC of 3 June 2003 on taxation of savings income in the form of interest payments, was a directive of the European Union enacted to implement the European Union withholding tax, requiring member states to provide other member states with information on interest paid to achieve effective taxation of the payments in the member state where the taxpayer is resident for tax purposes.

It was an anti-tax evasion measure, similar to FATCA. It was repealed on 10 November 2015, in favor of Directive 2014/107/EU.

== See also ==
- European Union withholding tax
- US Foreign Account Tax Compliance Act
