= Foreign Account Tax Compliance Act =

2010 U.S. tax law

- Acronyms (colloquial): FATCA
- Enacted by: the 111th United States Congress
- Effective: March 18, 2010 (26 USC § 6038D); December 31, 2017 (26 USC §§ 1471-1474)

Citations
- Public law: 111-147
- Statutes at Large: 124 Stat. 71, 97-117

Codification
- Titles amended: 26
- U.S.C. sections created: 26 U.S.C. §§ 1471–1474, § 6038D
- U.S.C. sections amended: 26 U.S.C. § 163, § 643, § 679, § 871, § 1291, § 1298, § 4701, § 6011, § 6501, § 6662, § 6677

Legislative history
- Introduced in the House and Senate as Foreign Account Tax Compliance Act of 2009 (S. 1934, H.R. 3933) by Max Baucus (D–MT); Charles Rangel (D–NY) on October 27, 2009; Committee consideration by Senate Finance, House Ways and Means; Passed the Senate on February 24, 2010 (70–28); Passed the House as the Hiring Incentives to Restore Employment Act, Title V, Subtitle A on March 4, 2010 (217–201) with amendment; Senate agreed to House amendment on March 17, 2010 (68–29); Signed into law by President Barack Obama on March 18, 2010

The Foreign Account Tax Compliance Act (FATCA) is a 2010 U.S. federal law requiring all non-U.S. foreign financial institutions (FFIs) to search their records for customers with indicators of a connection to the U.S., including records of birth or prior residency in the U.S., and to report such assets and identities of such persons to the United States Department of the Treasury. FATCA also requires such persons to report their non-U.S. financial assets annually to the Internal Revenue Service (IRS) on form 8938, which is in addition to the older and further redundant requirement to report them annually to the Financial Crimes Enforcement Network (FinCEN) on form 114 (also known as 'FBAR'). Like U.S. income tax law, FATCA applies to U.S. residents and to U.S. citizens and green card holders residing in other countries.

FATCA applies to all subjects identified as a U.S. person. All U.S. citizens are U.S. persons by default, but a non-U.S.-citizen can be eligible as a U.S. person for tax purposes, for example, Green Card holders and corporations under certain criteria. Inhabitants of unincorporated U.S. territories (American Samoa, the Commonwealth of the Northern Mariana Islands, Guam, Puerto Rico or the U.S. Virgin Islands) have a Resident Based Taxation. However, financial institutions are notified that U.S. taxpayer identification number (TIN) information is mandatory for all reportable accounts with FATCA reporting obligations, even residents of those territories do not pay taxes to the mainland U.S.A. Likewise, FATCA does not apply to Banks in Puerto Rico since they are classified as "Territory Financial Institutions". Nonetheless, customers in Puerto Rico must complete forms W-8BEN and W-8BEN-E as part of the account opening process and reportings are almost the same as other U.S. banks. However, Puerto Rico's Act 273 is that FATCA, Common Reporting Standards (CRS) and Intergovernmental Agreements (IGA) signed between the United States and a foreign country do not apply to International Financial Entities in Puerto Rico.

FATCA was the revenue-raising portion of the 2010 domestic jobs stimulus bill, the Hiring Incentives to Restore Employment (HIRE) Act, and was enacted as Subtitle A (sections 501 through 541) of Title V of that law. According to the IRS, "FFIs that enter into an agreement with the IRS to report on their account holders may be required to withhold 30% on certain payments to foreign payees if such payees do not comply with FATCA." The U.S. has yet to comply with FATCA itself, because as of 2017, it has not yet provided the promised reciprocity to its partner countries and it has failed to sign up to the Common Reporting Standard (CRS). FATCA has also been criticised for its effects on Americans living overseas, and implicated in record-breaking numbers of U.S. citizenship renunciations throughout the 2010s and 2020s. Bills to repeal FATCA have been introduced in the U.S. Senate and House of Representatives.

== Background ==
FATCA was reportedly enacted for the purpose of detecting the non-U.S. financial accounts of U.S. resident taxpayers rather than to identify non-resident U.S. citizens and enforce collections. However, although there might be thousands of resident U.S. citizens with non-U.S. assets, such as investors, dual citizens, or legal immigrants, FATCA also applies to the estimated 5.7 to 9 million U.S. citizens residing outside of the United States and those persons believed to be U.S. persons for tax purposes. FATCA also affects non-U.S.-person family members and business partners who share accounts with U.S. persons or who have U.S.-person signatories of accounts. This feature allows the reporting of the assets of non-U.S. corporations, volunteer organisations, and any other non-U.S. entity where a U.S. person can be identified.

FATCA is used to locate U.S. citizens (residing in the U.S. or not) and "U.S. persons for tax purposes" and to collect and store information including total asset value and Social Security number. The law is used to detect assets, rather than income. The law does not include a provision imposing any tax. In the law, financial institutions would report the information they gather to the U.S. Internal Revenue Service (IRS). As implemented by the intergovernmental agreements (IGAs) (discussed below) with many countries, each financial institution will send the U.S.-person's data to the local government first. For example, according to Ukraine's IGA, the U.S.-person data will be sent to U.S. via the Ukrainian government. Alternatively, in a non-IGA country, such as Russia, only the Russian bank will store the U.S.-person data and will send it directly to the IRS.

FATCA is used by government personnel to detect indicia of U.S. persons and their assets and to enable cross-checking where assets have been self-reported by individuals to the IRS or to the Financial Crimes Enforcement Network (FinCEN). U.S. persons, regardless of residence location and regardless of dual citizenship, are required to self-report their non-U.S. assets to FinCEN on an annual basis. According to qualification criteria, individuals are also required to report this information on IRS information-reporting form 8938. FATCA will allow detection of persons who have not self-reported, enabling collection of large penalties. FATCA allows government personnel to locate U.S. persons not living in the United States, so as to assess U.S. tax or penalties.

Under FATCA, non-U.S. ('foreign') financial institutions (FFIs) are required to report asset and identify information related to suspected U.S. persons using their financial institutions.

Under U.S. tax law, U.S. persons (regardless of country of residence) are generally required to report and pay U.S. federal income tax on income from all sources. The U.S. and Eritrea are the only two countries worldwide which tax non-resident citizens. The law requires U.S. citizens living abroad to pay U.S. taxes on foreign income if the foreign tax should be less than U.S. tax ("taxing up"), independently within each category of earned income and passive income. For this reason, the increased reporting requirements of FATCA have had extensive implications for U.S. citizens living abroad. Taxpayer identification numbers and source withholding are also now used to enforce asset reporting requirements upon non-resident U.S. citizens. For example, mandatory withholding can be required via FATCA when a U.S. payor cannot confirm the non-U.S. status of a foreign payee.

The IRS previously instituted a qualified intermediary (QI) program under 26 U.S.C. § 1441 which required participating foreign financial institutions to maintain records of the U.S. or foreign status of their account holders and to report income and withhold taxes. One report included a statement of a finding that participation in the QI program was too low to have a substantive effect as an enforcement measure and was prone to abuse. An illustration of the weakness in the QI program was that UBS, a Swiss bank, had registered as a QI with the IRS in 2001 and was later forced to settle in the UBS tax evasion controversy with the U.S. Government for $780 million in 2009 over claims that it fraudulently concealed information on its U.S. person account holders. Non-resident U.S. citizens' required self-reporting of their local assets was also found to be relatively ineffective.

The Hiring Incentives to Restore Employment Act (of which FATCA is a part) was passed on party lines: It narrowly passed the House, with no Republican members voting "yes" and passed the Senate with only one Democrat member voting "no". President Obama (D) signed the bill into law.

Senator Carl Levin (D-MI) has stated that the U.S. Treasury loses as much as US$100 billion annually to "offshore tax non-compliance" without stating the source of the data. On March 4, 2009, the IRS Commissioner Douglas Shulman testified before the subcommittee that there is no credible estimate of lost tax revenue from offshore tax abuse. In his book The Hidden Wealth of Nations, economist Gabriel Zucman estimates that U.S. persons hold US$1.2 trillion in financial wealth offshore. According to Zucman's analysis, this sheltering of assets results in US$36 billion in lost tax revenue annually in the United States.

Supplementing the reporting regimes already in place was stated by Senator Max Baucus (D-MT) to be a means of acquiring more financial data and raising government revenue. After committee deliberation, Sen. Max Baucus and Rep. Charles Rangel (D-NY) introduced the Foreign Account Tax Compliance Act of 2009 to Congress on October 27, 2009. It was later added to an appropriations bill as an amendment, sponsored by Sen. Harry Reid (D-NV), which also renamed the bill the HIRE Act. The bill was signed into law by President Obama on March 18, 2010.

== Provisions ==
FATCA has the following important provisions:

- Requires non-U.S. ('foreign') financial institutions such as banks to agree to search customer databases to identify those suspected of being US persons, and to disclose the account holders' names, TINs and addresses, as well as the transactions for most types of account. Some types of account, notably retirement savings and other tax-favored products, may be excluded from reporting on a country-by-country basis. U.S. entities making payments to non-compliant foreign financial institutions are required to "withhold... tax equal to 30 percent of the amount".

Foreign financial institutions which are themselves the beneficial owners of such payments are not permitted a credit or refund for taxes withheld, absent a treaty override.

US persons are identified by "FATCA indicia". A bank official who knows a U.S. person's status by other means is also required to identify that person for FATCA purposes. After identification, the FFI is responsible under the law for further questioning the individual.

- To implement this requirement, the IRS put out Form W-8BEN in February 2014. Since then, the IRS has required FFIs to have all foreign account holders certify their status on Form W-8BEN unless an intergovernmental agreement is in place authorizing another method of certification.

In other words, all account holders of FFIs are expected to confirm whether they are US persons or not. In practice, since the introduction of the Common Reporting Standard, FFIs are required to confirm the residence of all account holders as well as their US status.

- U.S. persons who own or have signing authority on these foreign accounts or assets must report them on the new IRS Form 8938, Statement of Specified Foreign Financial Assets, which is filed with the person's U.S. tax returns if the accounts are generally worth more than US$50,000. A higher reporting threshold applies to U.S. persons who are overseas residents and/or file jointly. Account holders would be subject to a 40% penalty on understatements of income in an undisclosed foreign financial asset. Understatements of more than 25% of gross income are subject to an extended statute of limitations period, six years. It also requires taxpayers to report financial assets that are not held in a custodial account, i.e. physical stock or bond certificates.
- Where foreign investors had not been due U.S. dividends the law introduced a method that converting them into "dividend equivalents" through swap contracts.
- FATCA also increased penalties and imposed certain negative presumptions on Americans whose accounts are not located in U.S.

The reporting requirements are in addition to the one that all U.S. persons report non-U.S. financial accounts to the U.S. Financial Crimes Enforcement Network (FinCEN). This notably includes Form 114, "Report of Foreign Bank and Financial Accounts" (FBAR) for foreign financial accounts, where the balances of such accounts in the aggregate exceed US$10,000, required under Bank Secrecy Act regulations issued by the Financial Crimes Enforcement Network.

== FATCA indicia ==
Banks which are performing functions according to FATCA law will be searching according to FATCA indicia, which include:

- A U.S. place of birth
- Identification of the account holder as a U.S. citizen or resident
- A current U.S. residence or mailing address (including a U.S. PO box)
- A current U.S. telephone number
- Standing instructions to pay amounts from a foreign (meaning non-U.S.) account to an account maintained in the United States
- A current power of attorney or signatory authority granted to a person with a U.S. address
- A U.S. "in-care-of" or "hold mail" address that is the sole address with respect to the account holder
- Special note: Others affected by FATCA include
  - any non-U.S. person who shares a joint account with a U.S. person or otherwise allows a U.S. person to have signatory authority on their account.
  - Any business or not-for-profit organization that allows a U.S. person to have signatory authority on a financial account.

== Revenue and cost ==
There are varying estimates of the revenues gained and likely cost of implementing the legislation.

=== Revenue ===
With implementation, FATCA was estimated by the United States Congress Joint Committee on Taxation to produce approximately $8.7 billion in additional tax revenue over 11 years (average $792 million a year). A later analysis from Texas A&M includes an estimate that revenues would be less than US$250 million per year (US$2.5 billion total). (Jane Gravelle, a specialist in economic policy at the Congressional Research Service, has asserted that this figure is small relative to her estimate of $40 billion per year as the cost of international tax evasion.)

"The actual annual tax revenue generated since 2009 from offshore voluntary disclosure initiatives and from prosecutions of individual's tax evasion is running significantly lower than the JCT's estimated annual average, at less than $400 million, and will probably result in less than that over the decade 2010 to 2020."

"The IRS has claimed that over ten billion dollars in additional tax revenues will be recovered from offshore accounts over the next decade. Since the enactment of FATCA the IRS has received approximately $8.0 billion nearly entirely from FBAR penalties and not from tax collection."

— William Byrnes

Recently, a calculation showed that $771 million of tax revenue loss from U.S. banks could nearly nullify the reported revenue gain reported by the Joint Committee.

=== Implementation cost ===
According to the Lebanese business magazine Executive, "FATCA requires major initial investment within an institution, estimated at $25,000 for smaller institutions, to $100,000 to $500,000 for most institutions and $1 million for larger firms. While a boon for the financial consultancy and IT industry, it is an extra cost that institutions would rather not have."

- Canada: According to the Financial Post, the Scotia Bank in Canada has already spent almost $100 million.
- Australia: The costs in Australia are estimated to be A$255 million for implementation, and A$22.7M for each year of maintenance. Over 10 years, this totals A$482.68M. With 77,000 resident US citizens (54% of whom are of dual citizenship) and known population of 24,003,100, the estimated implementation cost is A$6,270 per residing U.S. citizen, A$11,590 per U.S.-person account, or A$20.20 per capita. The most representative developed country has 661 bank accounts per 1,000 adults, and Australia has 82.1% population above 15 years old (adults). This yields an estimated 41,700 US-citizen bank customers in Australia, or a FATCA implementation cost of A$37.30 per customer. As there are 3,668 Australian FFI's are currently registered, the average estimated FATCA cost for each is A$132,000. The same analysis showed that costs without the IGA would be A$477M for implementation, and A$58.8M for each year of maintenance. Over 10 years, this totals A$1.066bn, which would have been A$44.40 per capita, A$81.10 per customer, A$13,800 per resident U.S. citizen, or A$25,600 per U.S.-person account. This is the only published non-IGA country cost estimation identified. Without an IGA, the estimated FATCA cost per FFI is A$291,000. Australia succeeded to locate only 30,000 of those US citizens (72% effectiveness) in its first FATCA submission to USA. It was determined that each located U.S. citizen bank account averaged A$160,000.
- New Zealand: The government of New Zealand has estimated that locating approximately 21,462 resident U.S. citizens would cost the government alone about $20,600,000. That cost would equal approximately 960 NZD per resident U.S. citizen, or about 4.48 NZD per capita. Country costs (including costs at the institutions) was not included in the reporting, nor were the financial implications made when the IGA was signed. Costs to FFI's was estimated to be 100 million NZD, just to bring New Zealand into initial FATCA compliance.
- Europe: The costs of implementation in Europe are shown (below) with available documentation to be greater than U.S. revenue estimates in only three of its countries. Implementation in UK, Germany, and Sweden alone will cost more than US$10 billion.
  - United Kingdom: The United Kingdom government has estimated that the cost to British businesses will be £1.1 billion to £2 billion for the first five years (approximately two thirds of the estimate total additional global tax revenue expected), in order to locate approximately 177,185 U.S. citizens. The cost there is then approximately £6,000 to £11,000 per resident US citizen or £17 to £31 per capita. HMRC estimates its own one-off IT and staff project costs at approximately £5m, with ongoing annual costs of £1.4m from 2016.
  - Germany: The costs in Germany are estimated to be €386 million for implementation, and €30 million for each year of maintenance. With 108,845 U.S. citizens residing in Germany and known population, the implementation cost is €6,027 per residing U.S. citizen, €10,390 per U.S.-person account, €8.07 per capita, or €13.91 per customer.
  - Sweden: The Swedish government administration stated that the costs of implementation should be considered versus the threatened 30% sanctioned tax which could be applied for non-compliance. Sweden could not estimate the business consequences of FATCA, despite that Swedish law requires that the business consequences must be evaluated for legislation. In following discussions, it was estimated that each small financial institute (comprising 95% of the FFI's) would incur 1 million SEK yearly FATCA administration costs. (Documentation of the costs to larger institutions has not been located.) IRS lists 744 FFI's to date, yielding a minimum estimated yearly cost of 744 million SEK (excludes the cost of the 5% larger institutions), or 7.44 billion SEK over 10 years. The costs to the Swedish government were estimated to be above 15 million SEK for implementation and 15 million SEK per year thereafter, for a 10-year public cost of 165 million SEK. Total FATCA implementation costs in Sweden are estimated to be greater than 7.61 billion SEK. With 9,784,445 inhabitants and 17,000 resident U.S. citizens, the Swedish government cost is 777 SEK per capita, 447,700 SEK per resident US-citizen resident and 937 SEK per adult Swedish account, or an astounding 539,984 SEK per adult resident U.S.-person account.
- United States: The total IRS costs for the FATCA program are $380 million.

Annual Costs of FATCA
Yr 2012: $8,177,055
Yr 2013: $27,554,441
Yr 2014: $33,625,624
Yr 2015: $110,955,823
Yr 2016: $101,846,152
Yr 2017: $97,614,710
Total: $379,773,805

Previously, there had been few reliable estimates for the additional cost burden to the U.S. Internal Revenue Service, although it seems certain that the majority of the cost seems likely to fall on the relevant financial institutions and (to a lesser degree) foreign tax authorities who have signed intergovernmental agreements. The FATCA bill approved 800 additional IRS employees (cost estimated to be $40 – $160 million per year). According to a TIGTA report, the cost to develop the FATCA XML data website is $16.6 million (which is $2.2 million over the budgeted amount). However, "IRS also submitted a budget request of $37.1 million for funding FATCA implementation for 2013, including the costs to staff examiners and agents dedicated to enforcing FATCA, along with IT development costs. This budget request does not identify the resources needed for implementation beyond fiscal year 2013." The I.R.S. "has been unable to ascertain all potential costs beyond those for IT resources."

== Criticism ==
Certain aspects of FATCA have been a source of controversy in the financial and general press. The Deputy Assistant Secretary for International Tax Affairs at the US Department of the Treasury stated in September 2013 that the controversies were incorrect (myths). In April 2017 the Committee on Oversight and Government Reform, led by Congressman Mark Meadows, held a hearing on unintended consequences of FATCA.

The controversies primarily relate to the following issues:

- Cost. Robert Stack provided the Treasury position that "Treasury and the IRS have designed our regulations in a way that minimizes administrative burdens and related costs." Estimates of the additional revenue raised seemed to be heavily outweighed by the cost of implementing the legislation. In March 2012 the Association of Certified Financial Crime Specialists (ACFCS) said FATCA was expected to raise revenues of approximately US$800 million per year for the US Treasury with the costs of implementation more difficult to estimate. ACFCS claimed it was extremely likely that the cost of implementing FATCA, borne by the FFIs, would far outweigh the revenues raised by the U.S. Treasury, even excluding the additional costs to the US Internal Revenue Service for the staffing and resources needed to process the data produced.
- Benefits versus cost. The intention of locating US persons and their non-US financial accounts was to increase tax revenues from the interest, dividends, and gains of those assets. The majority of assets located was expected be the international equivalent of standard checking and savings accounts, where the applicable interest was less than 0.5% during 2015. The majority of that income is already (by tax treaty) attributable to the country where it resides. (IRS Form 1116 is normally used to credit foreign taxes upon passive income.) Another source from which FATCA intends to raise revenue is in the identification of a wider population of US persons. However, the majority (82%) of overseas US persons filing owe no tax to the US (due to tax treaties).
- Possible capital flight. The primary mechanism for enforcing the compliance of FFIs is a punitive withholding levy on U.S. assets which the Economist speculated in 2011 might create an incentive for FFIs to divest or not invest in US assets, resulting in capital flight.
- Foreign relations. Forcing 'foreign' financial institutions and governments to collect data on US persons at their own expense and transmit it to the IRS has been called divisive and imperialist. Canada's former Finance Minister Jim Flaherty raised an issue with the "far reaching and extraterritorial implications" which would require Canadian banks to become extensions of the IRS and jeopardise Canadians' privacy rights. There are also reports of many foreign banks refusing to open accounts for Americans, making it harder for Americans to live and work abroad.
- Extraterritoriality. Robert Stack of the IRS said that extraterritoriality was incorrect (a myth): "FATCA has received considerable international support because most foreign governments recognize how effective FATCA, and in particular our intergovernmental approach, will be in detecting and combating tax evaders". The legislation enables US authorities to impose regulatory costs, and potentially penalties, on FFIs who otherwise have few if any dealings with the US. The U.S. has sought to ameliorate that criticism by offering reciprocity to potential countries who sign intergovernmental agreements (IGAs), but the idea of the US Government providing information on its citizens to foreign governments has also proved controversial. The law's interference in the relationship between individual Americans or dual nationals and non-American banks led Georges Ugeux to term it "bullying and selfish." The Economist called FATCA's "extraterritoriality stunning even by Washington's standards."
- Effect on "accidental Americans". The reporting requirements and penalties apply to all US citizens, including accidental Americans, those who are unaware that they have US citizenship. Since the US considers all persons born in the US, and most foreign-born persons with American parents, to be citizens, FATCA affects a large number of foreign residents, who are unaware that the US considers them citizens.
- Citizenship renunciations.
  - In 2013, Robert Stack of the IRS presented the administration's position that renunciations due to FATCA are incorrect (a myth), because: "FATCA provisions impose no new obligations on U.S. citizens living abroad." The statement ignores the FATCA self-certification processes and filings of form 8938. The US State Department admits that the rise in renunciation figures is related to US taxation policy. The State Department acknowledged the rise in relinquishments and renunciations, and expects them to rise further in the future.
  - In 2013, Time reported a sevenfold increase in Americans renouncing U.S. citizenship between 2008 and 2011, attributing this at least in part to FATCA. According to BBC News, the act is one of the reasons for a surge of Americans renouncing their citizenship—a rise from 189 people in Q2/2012 to 1,131 in Q2/2013. Another surge in renunciations in 2013 to record levels was reported in the news media, with FATCA cited as a factor in the decision of many of the renunciants. The number of Americans giving up U.S. citizenship started to increase dramatically in 2010 and rose to a record 6,707 in 2020.

Whereas the Federal Register stated that 3,415 people renounced or relinquished their citizenship or long-term residence in 2014, the IRS stated that 1,100 people renounced citizenship at only one particular US consulate during the first ten months of 2014. This contradicted prior claims that such statistics are not maintained at the consulates.

  - FY 2016: Renunciations rose by 26% from the previous record set in 2015, bringing the total to a new record of 5,411 for 2016. Many newspapers mentioned that this total included accidental American Boris Johnson, British Foreign Secretary and former Mayor of London, who was taxed by the IRS on the sale of his home in London despite only living in the US briefly as a toddler.
  - FY 2017: In the second quarter of 2017, 1,759 American citizens were reported to have renounced. The third quarter saw 1,376 renunciations.
- American citizens living abroad. The Wall Street Journal reported in July 2014 that "FATCA worsens the already profoundly unjust tax treatment of millions of middle-class Americans living abroad...FATCA rules were intended to correct a tax loophole. Applied to Americans living abroad, they are absurd." The Guardian reports that Americans living abroad feel financially terrorized by FATCA requirements. In 2013, Robert Stack stated the IRS position that "FATCA withholding applies to the US investments of FFIs whether or not they have US account holders, so turning away known US account holders will not enable an FFI to avoid FATCA." In July 2024, a new organization, Tax Fairness for Americans Abroad, was created to lobby to replace the U.S. system of citizenship-based taxation with the type of residence-based taxation that applies in almost every other country in the world, simultaneously rendering FATCA redundant for Americans abroad.
- Lack of reciprocity. There is no US legislation to allow reciprocity, and as of 2017, no reciprocal data exchanges have taken place. The model IGA states: "The Parties are committed to working with Partner Jurisdictions and the Organisation for Economic Cooperation and Development on adapting the terms of this Agreement and other agreements between the United States and Partner Jurisdictions to a common model for automatic exchange of information, including the development of reporting and due diligence standards for financial institutions." The president's budget for year 2014 included a proposal to allow the Treasury Secretary to collect information which could be used for FATCA reciprocity. The proposal stated that its intent was to "facilitate such intergovernmental cooperation by enabling the IRS to reciprocate in appropriate circumstances"; however, the proposal did not request to allow the Secretary to have further transmittal authority. The president's federal budget proposals of 2014, 2015 and 2016 did not list either costs or revenues for reciprocity implementation in any of the coming 10 years—thus assuming that this collection was either cost neutral or, more logically, it would be interpreted as not budgeted. FATCA doesn't follow the principle of mutual benefit of international bilateral agreements. IGAs were enforced under the imminent sanctions to foreign financial institutions, without any benefit or reciprocity for the rest of the countries.
- Reciprocity not authorised by Congress. FATCA as implemented by Congress included no mention of reciprocity. Rather, the Executive Branch's IGA implementation of FATCA has made reciprocity promises to foreign governments.
- IRS not equipped. According to The New York Times, the IRS is not equipped to handle millions of extra complicated filings. The IRS allowed 2014 and 2015 as a transition period for enforcement and administration for entities but not individuals. This lack of capacity, including closure of all IRS overseas offices, has contributed to breaches of taxpayer rights as noted in the 'most serious problems' section of multiple annual reports by the IRS Taxpayer Advocate.
- Complexity. Doubts were expressed as to workability of FATCA due to its complexity, and the legislative timetable for implementation was pushed back multiple times. According to U.S. national taxpayer advocate Nina Olsen in regard to FATCA: "This is a piece of legislation that is so big and so far-reaching, and [has] so many different moving pieces, and is rolling out in an incremental fashion (...) that you really won't be able to know what its consequences are, intended or otherwise,' Olson said. "I don't think we'll know that for years. And by that point we'll actually be a little too late to go, "Oops, my bad, we shouldn't have done this,' and then try to unwind it." Bloomberg reported in 2015 that the IRS help center is not able to provide adequate taxpayer customer service. In 2016, the Taxpayer Advocate reported that "FATCA implementation has created significant compliance burdens and risk exposures" for overseas Americans, and its "heavy-handed approach, especially when combined with the complexity surrounding IRS requirements, has negative consequences, both for FFIs and the IRS".
- Identity theft. The IRS reports that identity thieves are using fraudulent compliance requests as a "phishing" ruse to obtain sensitive account-holder information. As of April 2015, more than 150,000 financial institutions throughout the world were storing social security numbers and asset values of US citizens.
- Account closures. Due to the costs and complexity of implementing this legislation, many banks have been excluding US persons from holding financial accounts at their institutions. These closures, based upon nationality, have not been halted by government authorities. In fact, the EU affirmed the practice of closure based upon nationality, by stating "Banks have the right, under the contractual freedom principle, to decide with whom they want to contract. They can in any event refuse clients for sound commercial reasons." These closures are despite the fact that countries who have signed IGAs had also promised to not close the accounts of US persons.
- Additional complexity for US persons US persons were already forbidden by the Securities Act of 1933 to make investments in US Securities at banks which are not certified inside the US by the Securities and Exchange Commission. This disallows US persons from participating in any product which may contain US investment products. If a financial institution is not able to segregate non-US investments from other investment products, a bank may place a total ban upon US persons using their investment products.
- Minimum requirements without limits on the upper end. FATCA has minimum standards in its methodology of finding US persons. For example, the accounts with minimum end balance of US$50,000 must be investigated with at least the US-indicia criteria specified. The FATCA rules do not require any FFI not to investigate or report or FATCA-process accounts as low as zero. The FFI's are not prohibited from using any indicia to identify U.S. persons. There are no restrictions in FATCA regulations as to what is not allowed to be used against U.S. persons.
- Marketability of American financial products. European Parliament's Economic and Monetary Affairs Committee public hearing on FATCA May 29, 2013, Robert Stack stated, "I believe the, the members here present today and the participants understand that the United States, ah, put its markets at risk in doing FATCA"
- Income Tax Complications. For the 2014 tax year, National Bank of Canada Inc. issued 1099 forms for investments to US residents that only covered the 6 months prior to FATCA. With a 1099 form in hand, many residents filed income taxes not knowing the 1099 was incomplete. Subsequent years without 1099s leave residents guessing whether their dividends are 'qualified' for tax purposes or not.
- FATCA and human rights. In a 2016 paper, academics argue that tax evasion can be directly linked to violations of human rights. That situation must be balanced against the risk that collection techniques violate other human rights like privacy and the legitimate protection of trade secrets.
- FATCA and the European Union: Robert Stack of the IRS stated the administration position that it was incorrect (a myth) "that legislation could force foreign banks to violate laws in their own countries: [Instead,] Treasury's decision to implement FATCA through IGAs that are respectful of the individual laws and customs of partner jurisdictions has contributed to the significant international interest in participating in FATCA compliance efforts."
  - Privacy and data protection legislation in Europe. Civil rights such as the right to privacy, or the right to data protection as a taxpayer are compromised by FATCA and its IGAs. There is no provision in FATCA for the protection of taxpayer rights, complains legal researcher Leopoldo Parada. The association of data protection supervisors is working on the case. As for other data protection legislation in Europe, for instance, the Swedish law Personuppgiftslagen (PUL) or personal data law, requires (unforced) consent of the individual in order to send data to a third country. The need for the information must also be greater than the need for the person's privacy. It is forbidden to deliver data that is not protected to a level adequate to EU standards.
  - FATCA and the ECHR: All of parties to the European Convention of Human Rights (which includes all EU member states) are bound by its provisions including the interpretation through the case law of the European Court of Human Rights. Each law must have respect for an individual's private life except in cases of the state's or population safety, or the country's economic health. FATCA's data is not used for the benefit of any EU member state. An EU member's economic health is not improved by FATCA, it only avoids the threatened 30% tax sanctions by complying with FATCA.
  - EU requirements limiting data-sharing. FATCA does not fulfill the EU requirements limiting data-sharing which allow sharing to be done only with organizations following the (now invalidated) Safe Harbor Principles. The IRS is not listed as meeting this demand.
  - EU member state requirements that bank accounts be opened. Many EU countries require banks to open accounts for applicants (because this is the only method to receive salary). FATCA's mechanism to close bank accounts if FATCA demands are not met violates such laws (see insättningsgaranti in Sweden). New FATCA IGA requirements demand that banks shall not open accounts for US persons or accounts for non-US persons if the individual refuses to declare US-person status upon bank account applications.
- Duplicate reporting requirements. FATCA has implemented reporting requirements that significantly overlap with FBAR reporting requirements already in place. The National Taxpayer Advocate has recommended multiple times to eliminate this duplication.
- Extreme penalties. The maximum penalty for failing to file an FBAR is $100,000 or 50% of the value of the account, whichever is greater for each unfiled annual report. Because the statute of limitations period is six years, the maximum penalty is essentially 300% of the maximum account balances. Another penalty of $10,000 or more may apply if the person does not report the same account on Form 8938, Statement of Specified Foreign Financial Assets. This would be true even if the taxpayer did not owe any U.S. tax on unreported income from the account, and even if the taxpayer's tax preparer did not inform him or her of the FBAR filing requirement. Such large penalties may be unconstitutional under the excessive fines clause.
- Refusal of Domestic FATCA. Biden administration proposed a sweeping expansion of information reporting of domestic accounts in the US under the "American Families Plan Tax Compliance Agenda", with a threshold as low as $600, which effectively enforces the report of almost all financial accounts to the IRS. The proposal was rejected by the Congress of the US on 29 October 2021. Some of the reasons are the violation of privacy of US citizens as a basic right that should be disclosed only under reasonable means, including to the government, the lack of security of the IRS for the treatment of the data, and distrust about the power given to the government.

=== Opposition ===
==== Congressional bills to repeal FATCA ====
In 2017, bills to repeal FATCA were introduced in Congress: Senator Rand Paul (R-KY) introduced S. 869 in the Senate and Representative Mark Meadows (R-NC) introduced H.R. 2054 in the House of Representatives. On 26 April 2017, the Oversight and Government Reform subcommittee on Government Operations held a hearing called 'Reviewing the Unintended Consequences of the Foreign Account Tax Compliance Act', chaired by Congressman Meadows.

==== Republican National Committee ====
On January 24, 2014, the Republican National Committee passed a resolution calling for the repeal of FATCA.

==== American expatriates ====
American Citizens Abroad, Inc., (ACA) a not-for-profit organization claiming to represent the interests of the millions of Americans residing outside the United States, asserts that one of FATCA's problems is citizenship-based taxation (CBT). Originally, ACA called for the US to institute residence-based taxation (RBT) to bring the United States in line with all other OECD countries. Later in 2014, two ACA directors commented on the situation of Boris Johnson. In 2015, ACA decided on a more refined stance. ACA's current position on FATCA as of 2019 is published on its website.

In March, 2015, the United States Senate Committee on Finance sought public submissions to a number of Tax Reform Working Groups. Over 70 percent of all submissions to the International Taxation Working Group and close to half of all submissions to the Individual Taxation Working Group came from individual US expatriates, many citing specific consequences of FATCA in their countries of residence, and nearly all calling both for residence-based taxation and the repeal of FATCA.

==== Republicans Overseas Legal Challenge ====
In 2014, attorney James Bopp, Republicans Overseas, and Senator Rand Paul of Kentucky, Mark Crawford, among others, brought suit challenging the constitutionality of FATCA. Paul is among the individuals suing the U.S. Treasury and IRS. The plaintiffs, in the case Crawford v. U.S. Department of Treasury, argued that FATCA and related intergovernmental agreements violated the Senate's power with respect to treaties, the Excessive Fines Clause of the Eighth Amendment, or the Fourth Amendment right against unreasonable search and seizures. In 2016, the U.S. District Court for the Southern District of Ohio dismissed the suit, determining that the plaintiffs lacked standing. In 2017, the U.S. Court of Appeals for the Sixth Circuit upheld the dismissal.

==== Canadians, particularly those considered to be American persons for taxation purposes ====
Two American-Canadian dual citizens living in Canada, Virginia Hillis and Gwendolyn Louise Deegan, sued the Canadian government (specifically the Attorney General of Canada and the Minister of National Revenue) in 2014 in the Federal Court of Canada, claiming (among other things) that the intergovernmental US-Canadian agreement that implements FATCA violates the Canadian Charter of Rights and Freedoms, particularly the provisions related to discrimination on the basis of citizenship or national origin. The suit was prepared by a group called the Alliance for the Defence of Canadian Sovereignty (ADCS). In 2015, the Federal Court of Canada dismissed the suit, upholding the intergovernmental agreement. The Federal Court also rejected the claims in 2019, although a further appeal to the Federal Court of Appeal may follow.

==== Democrats Abroad ====
In April 2022, Democrats Abroad's Taxation Task Force voted to update its position, supporting the repeal of FATCA.

== Implementation ==
On September 11, 2018, the U.S. Government successfully prosecuted its first case against an individual for conspiracy to defraud the United States by failing to comply with FATCA. Former CEO of (liquidated) Loyal Bank Limited, (Note: Loyal Bank Limited was based in Saint Vincent and the Grenadines) Adrian Paul Baron (a British citizen) was arrested in Hungary, then transported to the U.S. for trial. Baron pleaded guilty, and was subsequently removed to England by authorities.

=== Domestic ===
FATCA added 26 U.S.C. § 6038D (section 6038D of the Internal Revenue Code) which requires the reporting of any interest in foreign financial assets over $50,000 after March 18, 2010. FATCA also added a requirement in 26 U.S.C. §§ 1471–1474 that US payors withhold taxes on payments to foreign financial institutions (FFI) and nonfinancial foreign entities (NFFE) that have not agreed to provide the IRS with information on accounts held by US persons. FATCA also added 26 U.S.C. § 1298(f) requiring shareholders of a passive foreign investment company (PFIC) to report certain information.

The US Department of the Treasury issued temporary and proposed regulations on December 14, 2011, (26 CFR 1.6038D-0T et seq.) for reporting foreign financial assets, requiring the filing of Form 8938 with income tax returns. The Department of the Treasury issued final regulations and guidance on reporting interest paid to nonresident aliens on April 16, 2012 (26 CFR 1.6049-4 et seq., 26 CFR 31.3406(g)-1). Treasury issued proposed regulations regarding information reporting by, and withholding of payments to, foreign financial institutions on February 8, 2012, and final regulations on January 17, 2013 (26 CFR 1.1471-0 et seq.). On December 31, 2013, the IRS published temporary and proposed regulations (26 CFR 1.1291-0T et seq.) on annual filing requirements for shareholders of PFICs. On February 20, 2014, the IRS issued temporary and proposed regulations making additions and clarifications to previously issued regulations and providing guidance to coordinate FATCA rules with preexisting requirements.

On April 2, 2014, the U.S. Department of the Treasury extended from April 25, 2014, to May 5, 2014, the deadline by which an FFI must register with the IRS in order to appear on the initial public list of "Global Intermediary Identification Numbers" (GIINs) maintained by the IRS, also known as the "FFI List." In June 2014, the IRS began publishing a monthly online list of registered FFIs, intended to allow withholding agents to verify the GIINs of their payees in order to establish that withholding is not required on payments to those payees.

=== International implementation ===
Implementation of FATCA may encounter legal hurdles. It may be illegal in foreign jurisdictions for financial institutions to disclose the required account information. There is a controversy about the appropriateness of intergovernmental agreements (IGAs) to solve any of these problems, intellectually spearheaded by Allison Christians.

France, Germany, Italy, Spain, and the United Kingdom announced in 2012 they consented to cooperate with the U.S. on FATCA implementation, as did Switzerland, Japan and South Africa.

The deputy director general of legal affairs of the People's Bank of China, the central bank of the People's Republic of China, Liu Xiangmin said "China's banking and tax laws and regulations do not allow Chinese financial institutions to comply with FATCA directly." The U.S. Department of the Treasury suspended negotiations with Russia in March 2014. Russia, while not ruling out an agreement, requires full reciprocity and abandonment of US extraterritoriality before signing an IGA. Russian President Vladimir Putin signed a law on June 30, 2014, that allowed Russian banks to transfer FATCA data directly to US tax authorities—after first reporting the information to the Russian government. Russian banks are required to obtain client consent first but can deny service if that consent is not given. Bangladeshi banks, which have accounts of US taxpayers, may report to the IRS, However they need prior approval of their clients.

A 2014 Swiss referendum against the act did not come to fruition.

In 2019, Japan signed a protocol in which they agreed to limit their assistance to collecting taxes from residents, including penalties for willful failure to file tax return.

==== Intergovernmental agreements ====
As enacted by Congress, FATCA was intended to form the basis for a relationship between the U.S. Department of the Treasury and individual foreign banks. Some FFIs responded however, that it was not possible for them to follow their own countries' laws on privacy, confidentiality, discrimination, and so on and simultaneously comply with FATCA as enacted. This resulted in the creation of intergovernmental agreements (IGAs) between the Executive Branch of the United States government and foreign governments. This development resulted in foreign governments implementing the US FATCA requirements into their own legal systems, which in turn allowed those governments to change their privacy and discrimination laws to allow the identification and reporting of US persons via those governments.

United States Jurisdictions with agreements regarding FATCA implementation Model 1 agreement in force Model 2 agreement in force Model 1 agreement not in force Model 2 agreement not in force

The United States Department of the Treasury has published model IGAs which follow two approaches. Under Model 1, financial institutions in the partner country report information about U.S. accounts to the tax authority of the partner country. That tax authority then provides the information to the United States. Model 1 comes in a reciprocal version (Model 1A), under which the United States will also share information about the partner country's taxpayers with the partner country, and a nonreciprocal version (Model 1B). Under Model 2, partner country financial institutions report directly to the U.S. Internal Revenue Service, and the partner country agrees to lower any legal barriers to that reporting. Model 2 is available in two versions: 2A with no Tax Information Exchange Agreement (TIEA) or Double Tax Convention (DTC) required, and 2B for countries with a pre-existing TIEA or DTC. The agreements generally require parliamentary approval in the countries they are concluded with, but the United States is not pursuing ratification of this as a treaty.

In April 2014, the U.S. Department of the Treasury and IRS announced that any jurisdictions that reach "agreements in substance" and consent to their compliance statuses being published by the July 1, 2014, deadline would be treated as having an IGA in effect through the end of 2014, ensuring no penalties would be incurred during that time while giving more jurisdictions an opportunity to finalize formal IGAs.

The Securities and Exchange Board of India (SEBI) said "FATCA in its current form lacks complete reciprocity from the US counterparts, and there is an asymmetry in due-diligence requirements." Furthermore, "Sources close to the development say the signing has been delayed because of Indian financial institutions' unpreparedness."

With Canada's agreement in February 2014, all G7 countries have signed intergovernmental agreements. As of 2024, the following jurisdictions have concluded intergovernmental agreements with the United States regarding the implementation of FATCA, most of which have entered into force.

Intergovernmental agreements
Jurisdiction	Model	Signature	Entry into force	Notes
Algeria	1	October 13, 2015	January 18, 2017	
Angola	1	November 9, 2015	October 2, 2017	
Anguilla	1	January 15, 2017	June 22, 2017	
Antigua and Barbuda	1	August 31, 2016	June 7, 2017	
Argentina	1	November 18, 2022	January 1, 2023	
Armenia	2	February 12, 2018	July 7, 2019	
Australia	1	April 28, 2014	June 30, 2014	
Austria	2	April 29, 2014	December 9, 2014	
Azerbaijan	1	September 9, 2015	November 5, 2015	
Bahamas	1	November 3, 2014	September 17, 2015	
Bahrain	1	January 18, 2017	March 5, 2018	
Barbados	1	November 17, 2014	September 25, 2015	
Belarus	1	March 18, 2015	July 29, 2015	
Belgium	1	April 23, 2014	December 23, 2016	
Bermuda	2	December 19, 2013	August 19, 2014	
Brazil	1	September 23, 2014	June 26, 2015	
British Virgin Islands	1	June 30, 2014	July 13, 2015	
Bulgaria	1	December 5, 2014	June 30, 2015	
Cambodia	1	September 14, 2015	December 23, 2016	
Canada	1	February 5, 2014	June 27, 2014	Implementation act published.
Cape Verde	1	March 30, 2021	February 7, 2024	
Cayman Islands	1B	November 29, 2013	July 1, 2014	
Chile	2	March 5, 2014		
China	1	in substance		
Colombia	1	May 20, 2015	August 27, 2015	
Costa Rica	1A	November 26, 2013	July 8, 2019	
Croatia	1	March 20, 2015	December 27, 2016	
Curaçao	1	December 16, 2014	August 3, 2016	
Cyprus	1	December 2, 2014	September 21, 2015	
Czech Republic	1	August 4, 2014	December 18, 2014	
Denmark	1	November 19, 2012	September 30, 2015	Implementation law L67 passed December 20, 2013. Draft implementation regulation published, hearing ended May 8, 2014. Due diligence deadlines June 30, 2015, and June 30, 2016.
Dominica	1	June 15, 2018	August 12, 2019	
Dominican Republic	1	September 15, 2016	July 17, 2019	
Estonia	1	April 11, 2014	July 9, 2014	
Finland	1	March 5, 2014	February 20, 2015	
France	1	November 14, 2013	October 14, 2014	
Georgia	1	July 10, 2015	September 18, 2015	
Germany	1	May 31, 2013	December 11, 2013	
Gibraltar	1	May 8, 2014	September 17, 2015	
Greece	1	January 19, 2017	December 13, 2017	
Greenland	1	January 17, 2017	November 30, 2018	
Grenada	1	October 17, 2016	April 6, 2018	
Guernsey	1	December 13, 2013	August 26, 2015	Draft implementation regulation published.
Guyana	1	August 29, 2016	September 29, 2017	
Haiti	1	in substance		
Honduras	1	March 31, 2014	February 19, 2015	
Hong Kong	2	November 13, 2014	July 6, 2016	
Hungary	1	February 4, 2014	July 16, 2014	
Iceland	1	May 26, 2015	September 22, 2015	
India	1	July 9, 2015	August 31, 2015	
Indonesia	1	in substance		
Iraq	2	in substance		
Ireland	1	January 23, 2013	April 2, 2014	
Isle of Man	1	December 13, 2013	August 26, 2015	Draft implementation regulation published.
Israel	1	June 30, 2014	August 29, 2016	
Italy	1	January 10, 2014	August 17, 2015	
Jamaica	1	May 2, 2014	September 24, 2015	
Japan	2	June 11, 2013	June 11, 2013	
Jersey	1	December 13, 2013	October 28, 2015	Draft implementation regulation published.
Kazakhstan	1	September 11, 2017	April 5, 2022	
Kosovo	1	February 26, 2015	November 4, 2015	
Kuwait	1	April 29, 2015	January 28, 2016	
Latvia	1	June 27, 2014	December 15, 2014	
Liechtenstein	1	May 19, 2014	January 22, 2015	
Lithuania	1	August 26, 2014	October 7, 2014	
Luxembourg	1	March 28, 2014	July 29, 2015	
Macau	2	December 14, 2016	July 30, 2021	
Malaysia	1	July 21, 2021	October 3, 2022	
Malta	1A	December 16, 2013	June 26, 2014	
Mauritius	1	December 27, 2013	August 29, 2014	
Mexico	1	November 19, 2012	January 1, 2013	Replaced by revised treaty on April 9, 2014, with no break in enforcement.
Moldova	2	November 26, 2014	January 21, 2016	
Montenegro	1	June 1, 2017	March 28, 2018	
Montserrat	1	September 8, 2015	October 28, 2016	
Netherlands	1A	December 18, 2013	April 9, 2015	
Nicaragua	2	in substance		
New Zealand	1	June 12, 2014	July 3, 2014	
Norway	1	April 15, 2013	January 27, 2014	
Panama	1	April 27, 2016	October 25, 2016	
Paraguay	2	in substance		
Peru	1	in substance		
Philippines	1	July 13, 2015		
Poland	1	October 7, 2014	July 1, 2015	
Portugal	1	August 6, 2015	August 10, 2016	
Qatar	1	January 7, 2015	June 23, 2015	
Romania	1	May 28, 2015	November 3, 2015	
Saint Kitts and Nevis	1	August 31, 2015	April 28, 2016	
Saint Lucia	1	November 19, 2015	September 1, 2016	
Saint Vincent and the Grenadines	1	August 18, 2015	May 13, 2016	
San Marino	2	October 28, 2015	August 30, 2016	
Saudi Arabia	1	November 15, 2016	February 28, 2017	
Serbia	1	April 10, 2019	January 8, 2020	
Seychelles	1	July 1, 2019		
Singapore	1	December 9, 2014	March 28, 2015	Replaced by revised agreement signed on November 18, 2018, entered into force on January 1, 2021.
Slovakia	1	July 31, 2015	November 9, 2015	
Slovenia	1	June 2, 2014	July 1, 2014	
South Africa	1	June 9, 2014	October 28, 2014	
South Korea	1	June 10, 2015	September 8, 2016	
Spain	1	May 14, 2013	December 9, 2013	
Sweden	1	August 8, 2014	March 1, 2015	
Switzerland	2	February 14, 2013	June 2, 2014	Parliamentary approval obtained; insufficient supporters for a referendum.
Taiwan	2	December 22, 2016		
Thailand	1	March 4, 2016	April 29, 2024	
Trinidad and Tobago	1	August 19, 2016	September 22, 2017	
Tunisia	1	May 13, 2019	September 9, 2019	
Turkey	1	July 29, 2015	June 14, 2021	
Turkmenistan	1	July 28, 2017	November 6, 2017	
Turks and Caicos Islands	1	December 1, 2014	July 25, 2016	
Ukraine	1	February 7, 2017	November 18, 2019	
United Arab Emirates	1	June 17, 2015	February 19, 2016	
United Kingdom	1A	September 12, 2012	August 11, 2014 (Note: In the UK, formal approval of treaties by the legislature before ratification is not required, although the Constitutional Reform and Governance Act 2010 requires that they are presented to Parliament with an explanatory memorandum, which the government did in September 2012.)	
Uzbekistan	1	April 3, 2015	July 7, 2017	
Vatican City	1	June 10, 2015	June 10, 2015	
Vietnam	1	April 1, 2016	July 7, 2016	

=== Delays in implementation of IGAs ===
Many jurisdictions are required to have their IGAs in effect and start exchange of information by 30 September 2015. The US IRS has issued Notice 2015–66, which relaxes the deadline for countries which have signed Model 1 IGAs "to hand over information regarding accounts held by U.S. taxpayers", if the jurisdiction requests more time and "provides assurance that the jurisdiction is making good faith efforts to exchange the information as soon as possible."

Implementation is noted as delayed in the following countries:

- Croatia "The Croatian tax authority announced September 10 (2015) that it would not implement reporting provisions of the intergovernmental agreement it signed with the United States by the September 30 deadline in the IGA but that Croatia would not be subject to the withholding tax."
- Philippines "The mandatory reporting of financial information on US nationals by local financial institutions, as required under the new treaty on Foreign Account Tax Compliance Act (Fatca) between the Philippines and the US, has been moved to the second quarter of 2016. Internal Revenue Commissioner Kim Jacinto-Henares has advised Philippine financial institutions that the required reporting of financial information on US nationals will not take place on September 30, as originally intended. The deferment was because the intergovernmental agreement (Iga) on Fatca has yet to be ratified by the Senate as a treaty." It is known (see above) that the treaty is not ratified by the US Senate, but it is not determined in the text if Philippines has ratified the FATCA IGA in its own Senate.
- Belgium "the Belgian Ministry of Finance orally confirmed that the IRS agreed to delay the FATCA reporting deadline. Belgian financial institutions now will have until the 10th day following the publication of the Belgian FATCA law into the Belgian official gazette to report their 2014 FATCA information to the Belgian tax authorities. The Belgian FATCA law is expected to be voted on before 2015 year-end."

== Related international regulations ==
In 2014, the OECD introduced its Common Reporting Standard (CRS) proposed for the automatic exchange of information (AEOI) through its Global Forum on Transparency and Exchange of Information for Tax Purposes. The G-20 gave a mandate for this standard, and its relation to FATCA is mentioned on page 5 of the OECD's report. Critics immediately dubbed it "GATCA" for Global FATCA.

The Common Reporting Standard requires each signatory country to gather the full identifying information of each bank customer, including additional nationalities and place of birth. Prior to the implementation of CRS, there had been no other method of fully and globally identifying immigrants and emigrants and citizens by way of their identification numbers, birthplaces, and nationalities. Each participating government is tasked with collecting and storing the data of all its citizens and immigrants and of transferring the data automatically to participating countries. CRS is capable of transmitting person data according to the demands of either residence-based taxation, citizenship-based taxation (CBT) or personhood-based taxation.

== Renunciation of citizenship ==
The number of Americans renouncing their citizenship has risen each year since the enactment of FATCA, from just 743 in 2009 to 3,415 in 2014, 4,279 in 2015, and 5,411 in 2016. Among those who renounced was the then Mayor of London, Boris Johnson, who did so after the IRS taxed the sale of his house in London. Due to the rise in applications and resulting backlog, the fee for renouncing citizenship was raised by roughly 400 percent in 2015 to $2,350. The 5,411 renunciations in 2016 were a 26% increase from the previous record, set in 2015. The number of renunciations for the first three quarters of 2017 was 4,448, which exceeds the entire year's total for 2015.

== See also ==
- Common Reporting Standard, dubbed the Global Account Tax Compliance Act (GATCA)
- European Union withholding tax
- Extraterritorial jurisdiction#United States
- FATCA agreement between Canada and the United States
- Financial Secrecy Index
- Foreign earned income exclusion
- Income tax in the United States
- International taxation#Citizenship
