= Certificate of Loss of Nationality =

United States document

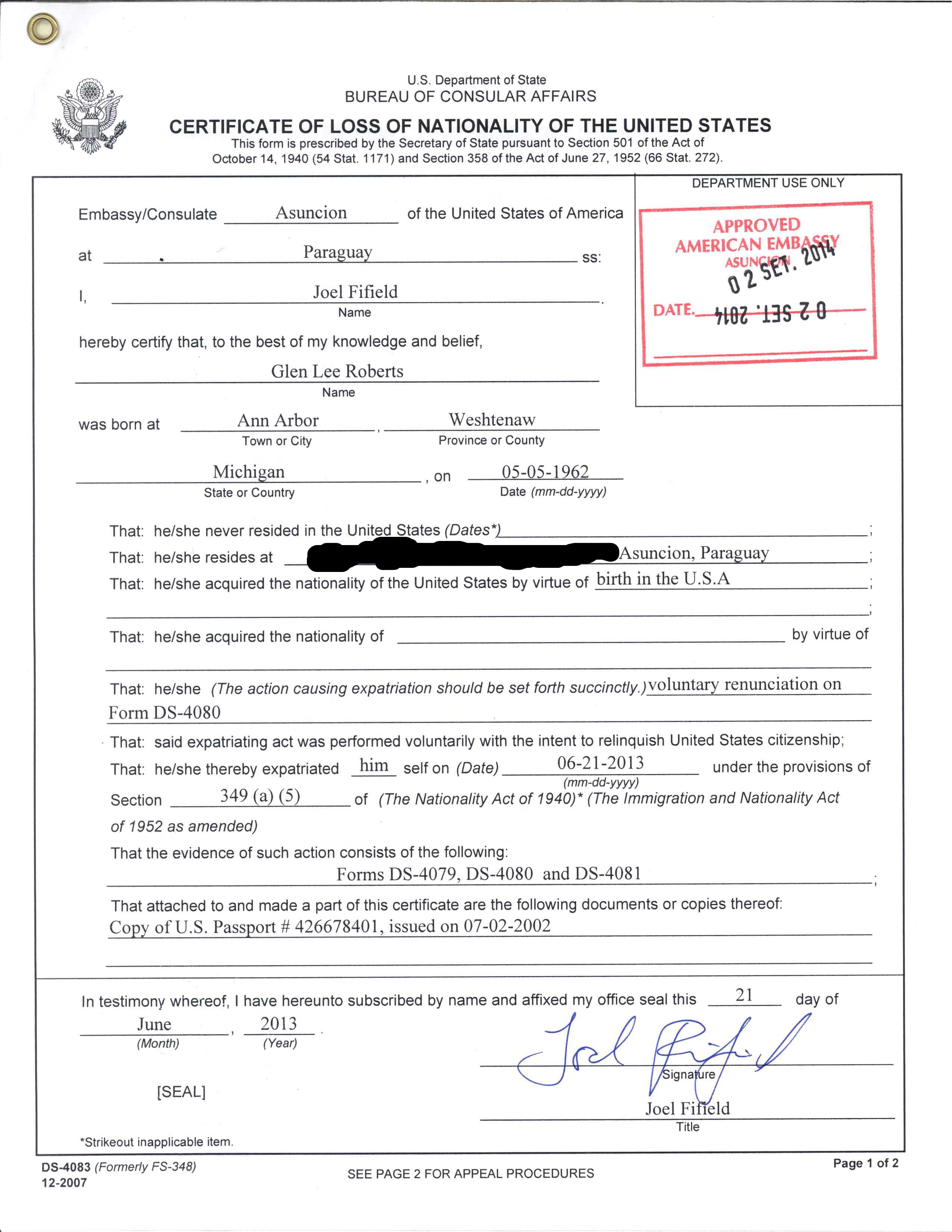
An example of a Certificate of Loss of Nationality

The Certificate of Loss of Nationality of the United States (CLN) is form DS-4083 of the Bureau of Consular Affairs of the United States Department of State which is completed by a consular official of the United States documenting relinquishment of United States nationality. The form is prescribed by the Secretary of State under the Immigration and Nationality Act of 1952.

A CLN is used only to document a loss of U.S. nationality and it does not effect the loss of U.S. nationality itself. However some provisions of U.S. regulations require a CLN be issued in order to recognize a person as a non-U.S. national even if as a matter of law that person is already probably not a U.S. national. One example of this are FATCA provisions as currently adopted in the US Code of Federal Regulations.

CLNs are applied for and issued at a U.S. consulate or embassy. Persons lacking an alternate nationality or refusing to declare one at the time of application may be listed as being stateless on their CLN. Unlike other countries, the United States allows persons to renounce their citizenship even when that person would become stateless upon loss of United States nationality.

== See also ==
- United States person
- Citizenship of the United States
- Non-citizen US national
