= American Citizens Abroad =

Organization of Americans residing outside the US

American Citizens Abroad, Inc.
- Formation: 1978
- Founder: Andy Sundberg
- Headquarters: 2001 L Street N.W.. Suite 500. Washington, DC 20036

American Citizens Abroad, Inc. (ACA) is a 501(c)(4) non-profit, non-partisan organization, organized as a Delaware corporation. Its sister organization, American Citizens Abroad Global Foundation (ACAGF), is a 501(c)(3) non-profit non-partisan charitable organization focused on education and research. ACA is a leading representative of American citizens residing outside the United States.

== Roles ==
ACA was founded in 1978 by the late Andy Sundberg and several other American citizens residing in Geneva Switzerland and neighboring France. In 2014 the principal offices were relocated to Washington, D.C.

ACA maintains close contacts with the Americans Abroad Caucus, a caucus within the U.S. Congress originally established in 2007 under the direction of former Congresswoman Carolyn Maloney, currently chaired by Congresswoman Dina Titus. ACA interfaces with U.S. government administrations and other agencies to educate these offices on the effects of U.S. legislation and regulations on U.S. citizens living and working overseas. ACA publishes regular news items for its members with information on new legislation, rules and events which affect U.S. citizens, whether living overseas or in the U.S.

ACA's web site also contains information on issues of concern to Americans overseas, including transmission of citizenship to children born abroad, taxation and voting. On taxation, ACA has written various pieces in its ongoing efforts to preserve the Foreign Earned Income Exclusion (FEIE), which is vital for Americans living and working overseas to avoid full double taxation.

ACA endorses adoption of Residence-based taxation (RBT) to alleviate the compliance and double taxation issues arising from the current system of Citizenship-based taxation (CBT). ACA has published a side-by-side comparative study of how changes in the current tax regime could be made to move to an RBT system of taxation.

ACA played a significant role in improving the ballot request form used for absentee voting. Banking is another area of current activity to counteract the disadvantages felt by Americans residing abroad, who often cannot open new bank accounts, neither in the U.S. because they have no address there needed to satisfy the Patriot Act, nor overseas because of the extra paperwork requirements imposed by the Foreign Account Tax Compliance Act (FATCA). ACA endorses a Same Country Exception (SCE) for FATCA reporting for U.S. citizens living and working overseas whose in-country financial accounts should not be considered "foreign".

ACA works with U.S. embassies and other groups in a bipartisan manner on issues of common concern; it has co-organized town meetings around the world. In 2012, ACA founder the late Andy Sundberg produced a 10-page report "Issues of Concern for U.S. Citizens Working Abroad".

== See also ==
- United States citizenship
- Voting rights in the United States
- Uniformed and Overseas Citizens Absentee Voting Act
- FATCA agreement between Canada and the United States
