= Hiring Incentives to Restore Employment Act =

Act of the United States Congress

- Long title: The Hiring Incentives to Restore Employment Act of 2010
- Acronyms (colloquial): HIRE
- Enacted by: the 111th United States Congress
- Effective: Generally March 18, 2010

Citations
- Public law: 111-147
- Statutes at Large: 124 Stat. 71-118

Codification
- Titles amended: 16, 23, 26, 49
- U.S.C. sections created: 26 USC §§ 1471-1474, 26 USC § 6038D
- U.S.C. sections amended: 16 USC § 777; 23 USC §§ 101, 403, 410, 2001; 26 USC §§ 38, 51, 54F, 163, 179, 643, 679, 864, 871, 1291, 1298, 3111, 4701, 6011, 6431, 6501, 6655, 6662, 6677, 9503; 49 USC §§ 5305, 5307, 5309, 5311, 5337, 5338, 8003, 31100, 31104, 31144, 31301, 31309

Legislative history
- Introduced in the House as Commerce-Justice-Science Appropriations Act, 2010 (H.R. 2847) by Alan Mollohan (D–WV) on June 12, 2009; Committee consideration by House Appropriations; Passed the House on June 18, 2009 (259-157); Passed the Senate as the Hiring Incentives to Restore Employment Act on February 24, 2010 (70-28) with amendment; House agreed to Senate amendment on March 4, 2010 (217-201) with further amendment; Senate agreed to House amendment on March 17, 2010 (68-29); Signed into law by President Barack Obama on March 18, 2010

The Hiring Incentives to Restore Employment (HIRE) Act of 2010 (Pub. L. 111–147 (text) (PDF), 124 Stat. 71, enacted March 18, 2010, H.R. 2847) is a law in the 111th United States Congress to provide payroll tax breaks and incentives for businesses to hire unemployed workers. Often characterized as a "jobs bill", certain Democrats in Congress state that it is only one piece of a broader job creation legislative agenda, along with the Travel Promotion Act and other bills.

== Legislative history ==
- The House of Representatives passed the original version on June 18, 2009 by a vote of 259–157.
- The Senate passed an amended bill on November 5, 2009 by a vote of 71–28.
- The House agreed to the amendments, with amendments, on December 16, 2009 by a vote of 217–212.
- The Senate agreed to the amendments, with amendments, on February 24, 2010 by a vote of 70–28.
- The House followed on March 4, 2010, passing an amended version (in compliance with new pay-as-you-go rules) by a vote of 217–201.
- On March 17,2010 the Senate agreed to the House's amendment by a vote of 68–29, and sent the bill to the President.
- President Barack Obama signed the bill on March 18, 2010.

== Provisions ==
Employers are eligible for a payroll tax credit when the employer hires certain new employees after February 3, 2010, and before January 1, 2011. In order to take the payroll tax credit, the employee must have either been unemployed for at least 60 days prior to hire or worked fewer than 40 hours for another employer during the previous 60 days. Employers do not pay the employer portion of social security tax, which is 6.2 percent, on wages paid to eligible new hires. In addition, employers receive a general business income tax break if the employer continues to employ the new hire for at least 52 weeks. The tax break is the lesser of $1,000 or 6.2 percent of wages paid to the new employee during the 52-week period. Household employers are ineligible for both tax benefits, as are new employees who are related to the employer. Also ineligible are employees who earn more than $106,000 per year and employees who displace a current employee, unless the first employee resigned or was terminated for cause. Employers may claim the credit after an eligible employee signs a statement affirming their previous unemployed status, such as Form W-11.

The Act also extends the $250,000 deduction limit under Internal Revenue Code section 179 through 2010, authorizes $20 billion for highway and transit projects, and makes reforms to municipal bonds.

Ostensibly to offset the costs of the Act, the new Foreign Account Tax Compliance Act (FATCA) enacts Chapter 4 of, and makes other modifications to, the Internal Revenue Code of 1986. It requires foreign banks to find any American account holders and disclose their balances, receipts, and withdrawals to the US Internal Revenue Service (IRS), or be subject to a 30-percent withholding tax on income from US financial assets held by the banks. Owners of these foreign-held assets must report them on US tax returns if they are worth more than $50,000 and those who do not would be subject to a 30-percent penalty on the balance of the account in question. FATCA also closes a tax loophole that investors had used to avoid paying any taxes on dividends by converting them into dividend equivalents.

However, allegedly as a result of FATCA, European banks such as Deutsche Bank, Commerzbank, HSBC, and Credit Suisse have been closing brokerage accounts for all US customers since early 2011 citing "onerous" US regulations, which FATCA made more complex when it went into effect in 2013.

== See also ==
- Foreign Account Tax Compliance Act
- Involuntary unemployment
- Tax haven
