= Andy Sundberg =

Andrew P. Sundberg
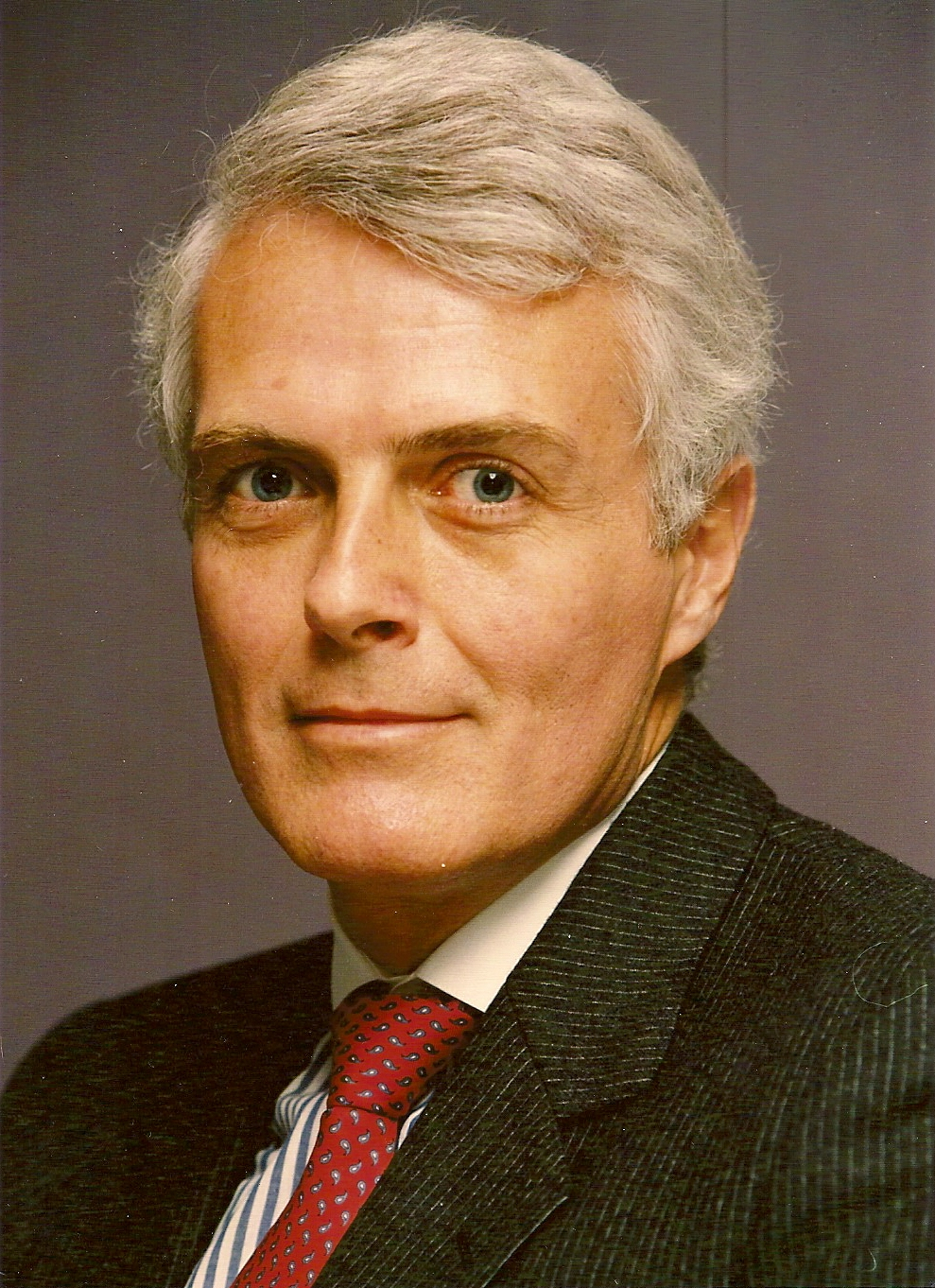
- Andy Sundberg as a presidential candidate
- Born: January 6, 1941; Hackensack NJ, USA
- Died: August 30, 2012 (aged 71); Geneva, Switzerland
- Occupation: entrepreneur
- Known for: setting up organizations to represent interests of Americans abroad and running for President of the United States from overseas

Andrew Peter Sundberg (January 6, 1941 – August 30, 2012) was an advocate for defending the rights of Americans living outside of the United States. He lived in the United States only a small portion of his life.

== Early life and education ==
Sundberg was born in Hackensack, New Jersey, to Edward Bernard Sundberg and Ruth Wildbush Sundberg, the second of three children. His father was an engineer who was called back into the Air Force during the Korean War, and the family was often stationed abroad. Sundberg attended junior high school in Tajikawa, Japan, and high school in Wiesbaden, Germany, before the family returned to live in Chicago. He was winner of a scholarship in the National Merit Scholarship Program. Sundberg was a 1962 graduate in engineering from the United States Naval Academy in Annapolis, Maryland. At Navy he was on the GE College Bowl team beating Army in 1960, and he captained the team in 1961. While at Annapolis, Sundberg was a founder of the Naval Academy Foreign Affairs Conference (NAVFAC).

After graduation from the Naval Academy, he won a Rhodes Scholarship (1963) for studies at Oxford University, where he obtained a master's degree in politics, philosophy and economics.

== Career ==
=== Military ===
Andy Sundberg served as a naval officer on board U.S. combat ships in Cuban waters during the Cuban Missile Crisis in 1962 and in the Gulf of Tonkin during the Vietnam War in 1967–68, until he was diagnosed with a career-ending medical condition.

=== Business ===
In 1968, after his retirement from the military, Sundberg and his wife moved to Geneva, Switzerland, which became their permanent home. After working briefly at the Battelle Institute in Geneva, he founded an international business consultancy which provided analysis to clients in many different economic sectors. He carried out a wide range of individual and multi-client studies and assignments in many different industries for more than fifty major corporations. Among others, he served as a consultant to the African Development Bank, the International Labor Organization, the United Nations Center for Science and Technology for Development (in North America, Europe, Japan, and Vietnam), the Foreign Aid Ministry of West Germany (in Brazil, Pakistan, Sri Lanka, Singapore, and Jordan), and the European Bank for Reconstruction and Development (in Russia and the other republics of the former Soviet Union) A lifelong entrepreneur, he also launched and brought to market one of the first internet service providers in the Geneva area in the early 1990s.

== Advocate ==
The consuming cause of Andy Sundberg's adult life was the defense of the interests of overseas American citizens vis-à-vis the U.S. Government in Washington, D.C.

=== American Children’s Citizenship Rights League ===
In 1977, because of the citizenship situation of his own daughters, he gathered together a group of like-minded Americans living in Europe, and they formed the American Children's Citizenship Rights League (ACCRL), which campaigned to change a feature of U.S. citizenship legislation (which Sundberg dubbed the “Cinderella” clause) under which young Americans born to families living overseas would lose their citizenship unless they resided in the United States for a fixed number of years before reaching a certain age. The efforts of the ACCRL were successful; with the help of Rep. Robert McClory (R-IL), the law was changed in 1978 to permit children born abroad to American citizens to retain United States citizenship acquired at birth.

Andy Sundberg with President Carter

=== American Citizens Abroad ===
In 1978 Sundberg and others from the ACCRL founded a broader non-partisan, non-profit organization, American Citizens Abroad (ACA) (americansabroad.org), to represent the interests of overseas Americans on a range of issues beyond just citizenship, including voting rights, Social Security, Medicare, representation and taxation. Sundberg headed the organization until 1990, and remained on its executive committee until shortly before his death.

=== Overseas Americans Academy ===
In 2008 Sundberg and a group of like-minded individuals founded the Overseas Americans Academy, to write discussion papers and speak out on issues related to American affairs and overseas Americans. Sundberg remained its Secretary and principal spokesman until his death.

== Political activities ==
Sundberg was fascinated with the American political process from childhood. He often recounted the story of how, as a young boy of eleven, he and his sister strolled around Capitol Hill in Washington, D.C., walked into the office of Secretary of State Dean Acheson, and charmed their way in to speak with Acheson himself.

The Overseas Citizens’ Voting Rights Act (Pub.L. 94-203), signed into law by President Gerald Ford on January 2, 1976, gave American civilians resident abroad the right to vote in federal elections. Both major parties established overseas committees. Sundberg helped found both Democrats Abroad - Switzerland and Republicans Abroad Switzerland.

He was worldwide chairman of Democrats Abroad from 1980 to 1985, and a member of the Democratic National Committee from 1981 to 1989. In the early 1980s, while living in Geneva, he flew regularly to Washington, where he served on the staff of the chief deputy majority whip in the U.S. House of Representatives.

In 1988 he became known worldwide when he ran for President of the United States as a candidate in the overseas Democratic Party primary; he came in third after winning the vote in five countries. His presidential campaign raised the awareness of issues and policies affecting overseas American citizens.

== Associations ==
Starting at university and during his entire life, Sundberg brought people together into many different organizations, political, literary, historical and others. He created in Geneva, among others, the Adam Smith Society, the Burlamaqui Club, and the Overseas American Academy.

In 2007 he organized a celebration for the 500th anniversary of the creation of the first map which mentioned the name America, in the French town of Saint-Dié where the map had been drawn up. In 2011 he organized an important celebration in Geneva for the 250th anniversary of the birth of Albert Gallatin (1761–1849), a Swiss from Geneva who emigrated to the United States and became the Secretary of the Treasury under President Thomas Jefferson. He was an active member of Liberal International from 1984 until his death and worked with the Committee on Migration of the Parliamentary Assembly of the Council of Europe for more than a decade. Sundberg was also a life member of the American Legion and the Veterans of Foreign Wars.

Shortly after Sundberg's death, one of his initiatives came to fruition: a report was published by a Working Group of Americans living in Switzerland, which had organized a series of Town Hall Meetings held in different Swiss cities earlier in 2012. This review of how various U.S. policies impact citizens abroad was aimed at getting these issues onto the radar screens of Washington policy-makers.

== Personal life and death ==
Sundberg married Chantal Messan of Chambéry, France, whom he met while at Oxford, on December 24, 1966. They had two daughters and one granddaughter.

Sundberg died of post-operative complications on August 30, 2012, in Geneva, Switzerland. Memorial announcements appeared in the Swiss news-agency, Ellen Wallace's blog Geneva Lunch, Victoria Ferauge's blog, the Website of the Federation of American Women's Clubs Overseas. and in Swiss Romande's leading newspaper .

== Honors ==
Sundberg was awarded American Citizens Abroad's Eugene Abrams Citizenship Award in 2008, in acknowledgment of his lifetime contributions to the cause of improving the status and increasing appreciation of overseas Americans. He was also awarded a lifetime achievement by the Paris-based Association of Americans Resident Overseas (www.aaro.org) in 2012. The presentation of the award was made to his widow in January 2013. He was made an honorary member of FAWCO, the Federation of American Women's Clubs Overseas, in recognition of his work on behalf of children born to American women overseas who were not eligible for United States citizenship.

== See also ==
- American Citizens Abroad

== Publications ==
- "The expatriate employee: A comparative survey on how eight countries treat their citizens working abroad and the resulting cost impact on companies". Business International S.A. and Consultex S.A., Geneva, 1979. 276 pp.
- "History of US Taxes Abroad from 1787 to 2001", 2011
