= Allison Christians =

Allison Christians is a tax law scholar and the H. Heward Stikeman Chair in Tax Law at the McGill University Faculty of Law/Faculté de Droit in Montreal, Quebec, Canada. Her research and teaching focus on Canadian and U.S. domestic and international tax law and policy issues, with an emphasis on the relationship between taxation and economic development and on the role of government and non-government institutions and actors in the creation of tax policy norms.

Her work includes frequent analysis of both domestic and international tax policies relating to laws such as the 2010 US Foreign Account Tax Compliance Act, the 2012 Protecting Canada's Immigration System Act (a.k.a. Bill C-31), and the policies put forth by organizations like the Organisation for Economic Cooperation and Development.

== Career ==
Christians received her LL.M. degree in Taxation from the NYU School of Law and her Juris Doctor degree from Columbia Law School.

Christians worked as a tax lawyer at Wachtell, Lipton, Rosen & Katz in New York, where she focused on the taxation of domestic and cross-border mergers and acquisitions, spin-offs, restructurings and associated issues and transactions involving private and public companies. She also worked at Debevoise & Plimpton in New York, where she focused mainly on private equity funds.

Christians taught at the University of Wisconsin Law School and Northwestern University School of Law before joining the Faculty of Law at McGill University in 2012 and has held visiting positions at Leiden University, Thammasat University, and the University of Ottawa Faculty of Law.

=== Commentator and analyst ===
Christians is the author of 'The Big Picture,' a column for Tax Analysts' Tax Notes International, serves as editor of the Tax section of Jotwell, and regularly comments on developments in international tax law and policy on the Tax, Society & Culture blog, on the Lexis Nexis Tax Law Community blog, and on Twitter @profchristians.

She is also an active member of the International Fiscal Association and has been involved in projects with the International Bar Association Human Rights Initiative.

=== Foreign Account Tax Compliance Act ===
Christians has been a vocal opponent to the United States' Foreign Account Tax Compliance Act (FATCA), speaking out against it in multiple academic and news articles, conferences, and at the Canadian Parliament's Standing Committee on Finance.

The United States Congress enacted FATCA to curb tax avoidance by US persons by requiring that any bank around the world that holds an account of a US person report the financial information relating to that bank account to the Internal Revenue Service, among other things. One of her biggest criticisms is that she believes the U.S. Treasury lacks the power to make intergovernmental agreements (IGAs) that are crucial to the functioning of FATCA. The IGAs, now signed with over 150 countries, state that the foreign country will mandate that its banks comply with FATCA. Instead, she argues, the power to make such agreements (what she calls "treaties") only lies within the US Congress.

Additionally, she argues that FATCA traps many individuals who were not aware that they are U.S. citizens in the first place, or those who are simply not aware that they are subject to the United States' citizenship-based taxation regime, thanks in large part to birthright citizenship. The United States' citizenship-based tax system is one of only two in the world. It requires that U.S. citizens and permanent residents to file tax returns with the IRS every year, regardless of their physical location of residence. The other country that does this is Eritrea, but it has been widely criticized in the United Nations by many countries, including the United States.

=== Supporter of windfall profits tax ===
In October 2020, Christians commented favourably on Jagmeet Singh's proposal to tax windfall profits of Canadian corporations in light of the astronomical deficits created by the Canadian response to the COVID-19 pandemic. Christians explained: "It's not a punishment of [corporate] success. Rather, it's an acknowledgement that the brokenness of the market has created a windfall for them... And if the government takes some of that, especially now to pay for things that we now really are struggling to pay for, for example, health care, then that's good over all for the economy."

=== The Tiny Tax Band ===
Christians co-founded the Tiny Tax Band, a tax law-themed cover band, in April 2023. Originally supported by a grant from the Fonds de recherche du Québec's Programme Dialogue, which aims to make scholarly research accessible to the general public, the band has garnered over 100,000 views on social media and over 250,000 streams on Spotify.

== Selected publications ==
Christian's publications include over 40 articles and 6 book volumes. Books, a selection:

- Christians, A., & Apeldoorn, L. v. (2021). Tax cooperation in an unjust world (First edition). Oxford University Press.
- Mosquera Valderrama, I. J., Heitmüller, F., Chaisse, J., & Christians, A. (2025). Redefining global governance : a tax, trade and investment perspective in the EU and beyond.
- Rocha, S. A., & Christians, A. (2017). Tax sovereignty in the BEPS era. Wolters Kluwer.

Articles, a selection:

- Christians, A. (2022). WHO SHOULD TAX MULTINATIONALS? Social Philosophy and Policy, 39(1), 208–225.
- Christians, A. (2022). Cross-Border and Multijurisdictional Issues in Carbon Taxation—Carbon Pricing and the Income Tax. Canadian Tax Journal, 70(1), 97–110.
- Christians, A. (2021). Designing a more sustainable global tax system. Dalhousie Law Journal, 44(1), 19–48.
- Christians, A. (2022). Policy Forum: Cross-Border and Multijurisdictional Issues in Carbon Taxation—Carbon Pricing and the Income Tax. Canadian Tax Journal/Revue Fiscale Canadienne, 70(1), 97–109.
- Christians, A., & Magalhães, T. D. (2023). The Case for Taxing Away Unsustainable Profits. George Washington Law Review, 91(3), 697–754.
- Christians, A., & Magalhaes, T. D. (2019). A New Global Tax Deal for the Digital Age. Canadian Tax Journal, 67(4), 1153–1178.
- Christians, A., & Ezenagu, A. (2016). Kill-Switches in the U.S. Model Tax Treaty. Brooklyn Journal of International Law., 41(3), 1043–1080.
- Christians, A. (2010). Global trends and constraints on tax policy in the least developed countries. University of British Columbia Law Review, 42(2), 239–274.

== Awards ==
Christians was given the teacher of the year in 2009 by the Wisconsin Law Alumni Association, and in May 2014 she was awarded the John Durnford Prize in Teaching Excellence by the Law Student Association of McGill University.

== See also ==
- FATCA agreement between Canada and the United States
