= Julius Melnitzer =

Canadian legal writer and ex-lawyer

Julius Melnitzer is a Canadian freelance legal writer and former lawyer.

He worked for the law firm now known as Cohen and Highley.

In 1992, he pleaded guilty to 42 counts of fraud in relation to defrauding five Canadian banks out of $67 million. He was sentenced to nine years in jail. He was a founding partner of "Cohen, Highley" in London, Ontario.

It was the largest personal loan fraud in Canadian history.

After being disbarred, Melnitzer became a prominent legal affairs writer and as of January 2021, has bylines in the Financial Post.

== Crime and punishment ==
Melnitzer was a successful and high-profile lawyer in London, Ontario, when he began a scheme to print fake stock certificates to be used as collateral to get loans from major Canadian banks. He was caught when an officer at National Bank of Canada became suspicious and asked for an inspection of the certificates. Melnitzer was arrested three days later. He was later disbarred, and at his sentencing the judge read a "scathing" indictment on his actions. Melnitzer was given day parole two years later, and then full parole in 1995.

Melnitzer's partner at the time of the fraud, Fletcher Dawson, and he was duped for about $100,000. Future London MPP Chris Bentley was an articling student at Melnitzer's firm.
