= European Union withholding tax =

The European Union withholding tax is the common name for a withholding tax which is deducted from interest earned by European Union residents on their investments made in another member state, by the state in which the investment is held. The European Union itself has only limited taxation powers, so the name may be considered a misnomer. The aim of the tax is to ensure that citizens of one member state do not evade taxation by depositing funds outside the jurisdiction of residence and so distort the single market. The tax is withheld at source and passed on to the EU Country of residence. All but three member states disclose the recipient of the interest concerned. Most EU states already apply a withholding tax to savings and investment income earned by their nationals on deposits and investments in their own states. The Directive seeks to bring inter-state income into the same arrangement, under the Single Market policy.

== Creation ==
The tax was introduced at the time of the introduction of the European Union Savings Directive (EUSD), a directive on the taxation of interest income from savings within the European Union that came into effect on 1 July 2005.

== Objective of the EU Savings Directive ==
The original aim of the EUSD was that all countries would freely disclose interest earned by a resident of an EU country in order to ensure that the interest was fully declared in his country of residence. The plan was that non-EU countries would also agree to disclose information about the interest earned by EU residents. Many non-EU states and countries agreed to introduce similar measures. These countries included most tax havens and dependent territories of the EU countries. Countries such as the Isle of Man, Jersey, Guernsey, Cayman Islands, Andorra, Turks & Caicos, British Virgin Islands, Monaco, Switzerland, and many others thus agreed to implement similar or transitional arrangements (see below). The transitional arrangements involved the payment of a withholding tax whilst bank secrecy remained protected.

== Maintenance of bank secrecy laws and the EU withholding tax ==
Some countries agreed to fully comply with the EU Savings Directive by disclosing the names of their account holders and the interest that they earned. However, several other EU and non-EU countries, such as Switzerland, objected to the disclosure of account holders' names on the grounds that such a disclosure would be contrary to their bank secrecy laws. Bank secrecy laws prevent the disclosure of information about account holders, their assets, and their interest or other income.

Finally an agreement was struck with the objecting countries. The objecting countries achieved agreement from the EC that no further attempt would be made to commence negotiations regarding bank secrecy rules for at least 7 years, in return for which individual account holders could, if they so wished, voluntarily elect to waive bank secrecy and authorise disclosure. Those individuals who did not make any election would see a withholding tax deducted from their bank and bond interest. To avoid the withholding tax, certain types of individuals could also prove that they were exempt from taxation in their country of residence. Exempt individuals include certain diplomats and others with a special tax status in their country of residence.

Accordingly, in order to guarantee privacy and bank secrecy for EU residents who have accounts within certain territories such as Switzerland, a withholding tax of 35% is being levied on the interest earned by those EU residents. This withholding tax, which applies only to certain interest income NOT considered as sourced in Switzerland, such as interest earned on fiduciary deposits, is passed on anonymously to the EU countries concerned, and is known informally as the EU Withholding Tax.

== Example with interest on a fiduciary deposit ==
In the example below we use Greece as an example, but the same mechanism applies to any Member State.

If a Greek individual receives e.g. EUR 500 of interest income from a fiduciary deposit in a Swiss bank, the individual would have 2 possibilities:

(1) to accept the levying of the 35% "retention" tax under the EU-CH agreement (as discussed above), or

(2) to expressly authorise the Swiss bank to report that he has received the interest payments to the Swiss authorities that are then obliged to pass on automatically the information to the Greek competent authority (Art. 2 of the EU-CH agreement).

If the beneficial owner decides to be subject to the 35% "retention" tax under the EU-CH agreement, upon filing the Greek tax return, that tax is fully creditable, with possible subsequent reimbursement by Greece under Article 9(1) of the EU-CH agreement: "Where this amount exceeds the amount of tax due on the total amount of interest subject to retention in accordance with its national law, the Member State of residence for tax purposes shall repay the excess amount of tax withheld to the beneficial owner.". In the example, the "retention" tax under the EU-CH agreement is 500*0.35=175. 75% of that EUR 175 (175*0.75=131.25) would be transferred anonymously to Greece. Upon filing his tax return, the Greek beneficial owner is entitled to full credit, not only for the amount paid to Greece (EUR 131.25), but for the total "retention" tax levied under the EU-CH agreement (EUR 175). Therefore, if the Greek tax liability would be 500*0.10=50 and the credit would be EUR 175, the credit would cover 100% of the Greek tax liability and would exceed it by 50-175=-125. That excess credit (EUR 125) must be refunded to the beneficial owner by Greece.

If the beneficial owner chooses option (2) and authorises the Swiss bank to report the information, he will be only taxed in Greece according to the Greek domestic rate of 10% and the Greek competent authority will have the possibility to check that he has correctly declared the interest payments received from the Swiss bank.

== Example with interest on an ordinary bank account (i.e. NOT a fiduciary deposit) ==
In the example below we use Greece as an example, but the same mechanism applies to any Member State.

If a Greek beneficial owner has an ordinary bank account (i.e. not a fiduciary deposit) that produced interest income of e.g. EUR 500, he will be subject to 35% anticipatory tax in Switzerland under its domestic law (i.e. NOT under the EU-CH Agreement), i.e. 500*0.35=175.

Then, if the beneficial owner would like to use the reduced rate under GR-CH double tax treaty (10%), he would have to file a refund claim to the Swiss tax authorities. That claim would have to be accompanied by a certificate of tax residence issued by the Greek tax authorities. When requesting this certificate, the beneficial owner is effectively signalling to the Greek tax authorities the fact that he has earned or will earn income from a foreign source. Once he has filed the refund claim to the Swiss authorities, the Greek beneficial owner will be entitled to a refund for the difference between the anticipatory tax (500*0.35=175) and the maximum tax under the double tax treaty (500*0.10=50), which is 175-50=125. So, the actual tax burden in Switzerland after the application of the refund procedure is EUR 50. Now if the Greek domestic tax on the inbound interest income is 10%, it would in principle be levied on a gross basis, i.e. the tax base would be the full amount of interest income received (EUR 500). The Greek tax liability would be 500*0.10=50. However, under Art. 22 of the GR-CH Double tax treaty "Where a resident of Greece derives income which, in accordance with the provisions of this Convention may be taxed in Switzerland, Greece shall allow as a deduction from the tax on the income of that resident an amount equal to the income tax paid in Switzerland. Such deduction shall not, however, exceed that part of the Greek tax, as computed before the deduction is given, which is attributable to the income which may be taxed in Switzerland." The Greek beneficial owner would therefore be entitled to credit the EUR 50 levied in Switzerland against his tax liability in Greece, which is also EUR 50. Therefore, after the application of the credit, the Greek beneficial owner would not owe any Greek tax on that interest income.

== Countries affected ==
The EU withholding tax currently applies to the residents of the 27 European Union Member States as shown below:

Together with their dates of accession, the 27 current members of the European Union are:

- Austria (1995)
- Belgium (founding member: 1952/58)
- Bulgaria (2007)
- Croatia (2013)
- Cyprus (2004)
- Czech Republic (2004)
- Denmark (1973)
- Estonia (2004)
- Finland (1995)
- France (founding member: 1952/58)
- Germany (founding member: 1952/58)
- Greece (1981)
- Hungary (2004)
- Ireland (1973)
- Italy (founding member: 1952/58)
- Latvia (2004)
- Lithuania (2004)
- Luxembourg (founding member: 1952/58)
- Malta (2004)
- Netherlands (founding member: 1952/58)
- Poland (2004)
- Portugal (1986)
- Romania (2007)
- Slovakia (2004)
- Slovenia (2004)
- Spain (1986)
- Sweden (1995)

== Income on which the EU tax is deducted ==
The EU withholding tax applies only to bank interest, bond interest, and analogous income, such as income from bond funds, money market funds, loans, and mortgages.

== Anti-avoidance ==
Certain anti-avoidance measures exist, for example, to levy the tax where interest has been converted to some form of capital gain. Typically this would apply where, for example, a zero coupon bond has been bought and sold at a profit, or where a bond fund, or a money-market fund, does not pay out its interest and the fund is subsequently sold at a profit. The rules define how much of the fund's assets must be in bonds for it to be classified as "interest earning".

Initial reports as to the amounts of funds raised by the withholding tax suggest that the anti-avoidance measures have not been particularly effective.

== Income gains and profits which are not taxed ==
The EU withholding tax is not levied on any other forms of income such as employment income, trading profits, commercial activities, royalties, annuities and similar income. Also, the EU withholding tax does not apply to dividends from shares, nor to capital gains and other profits realised on investments. All these types of income and profits are described as being "out of scope".

== Individuals and accounts which are not affected ==
The EU withholding tax is levied only on individuals and not on companies, discretionary trusts, foundations, stiftungen, anstalts, investment funds, etc., except in very special circumstances, e.g. a "bare trust".

The EU withholding tax is not deducted from individuals who reside outside the European Union. Thus, for example, a resident of Jersey or of Switzerland, would not pay the tax, even though these countries have signed the agreement with the EU. Neither Jersey nor Switzerland are in the European Union.

== Companies ==
The EU withholding tax does not apply to interest paid to companies. A separate EU directive, the Interest and Royalties Directive, applies to interest (or royalties) paid by a company in one member state to an associated company in another member state. Such interest is exempt from withholding tax, although in many cases interest paid is in any event exempt from withholding tax under the terms of double tax treaties between member states.

== UK resident but not UK domiciled individuals ==
In the UK such individuals have a special tax status which limits them to paying tax on income and gains from UK sources, and on foreign income and gains which are remitted to the UK. A similar status can be accorded to individuals in some other European countries (e.g. Belgium and the Netherlands), because they are only temporarily resident for the purpose of employment. Certain countries such as Jersey and Switzerland accept that these individuals may be exempt from tax on income earned and retained overseas, and are thus not subject to any retention. The exemption needs to be proven.

== Beckham Law ==
Spain has introduced a similar concept to the UK non-domiciled rule above, known as the Beckham law. The law gained its nickname after the footballer David Beckham became one of the first foreigners to take advantage of it. However the law is aimed at all foreign workers (particularly the wealthier ones) living in Spain. Upon application and acceptance such individuals are only liable for Spanish taxes on their Spanish source income and assets. As with the UK non-domiciled individuals, exemption from tax on foreign income must be proven to the financial institution to avoid the EU Savings Tax deduction.

== The transitory provisions of the Withholding Tax ==
The Countries that would be applying the transitory provisions, instead of exchanging information will retain withholding tax as follows:

- 15% in the first three years (2005-07-01 – 2008-06-30),
- 20% in the next three years (2008-07-01 – 2011-06-30), and
- 35% after 2011-07-01.

With regard to the distribution of their withholding tax, the Directive provides that all Countries that are withholding it will retain 25% of all receipts at their end and will transfer the remaining 75% to the Member State where the beneficiary owner is resident.

With regard to double taxation, the Directive provides that the Member State where the beneficiary owner is resident, and therefore where he normally pays his tax dues, should ensure that tax is not paid more than once when applying the withholding tax rates.

== Countries providing for the exchange of information ==
As of 2018, all EU member states exchange information with each other, per EU Council directive 2014/107/EU.

Prior to 2017, there were several exceptions for member countries. The most recent exception was Austria. Belgium decided to discontinue applying the transitional withholding tax in 2010 and exchange information afterwards. In Luxembourg, clients could choose between exchange of information and withholding tax retention until 2015.

Gibraltar is deemed to be part of the UK for the purposes of the EU Savings Directive and thus will exchange information with other EU countries such as Spain and the UK. Residents of Gibraltar will either suffer withholding tax on interest arising overseas, or have that income reported to the UK who will pass it on to Gibraltar authorities.

Among the third countries signatories there are also, Anguilla, Cayman Islands, Montserrat and Aruba who have agreed to exchanging information.

== Countries providing for tax withholding under the Transitory Provisions ==
Countries that are not EU member states that also maintain bank secrecy:

- Andorra
- British Virgin Islands
- Channel Islands
- Lebanon
- Liechtenstein
- Monaco
- Netherlands Antilles
- San Marino
- Switzerland, although on 25 Sep 2009, Switzerland was added to the OECD list of countries having substantially implemented the internationally agreed tax standards
- Turks and Caicos Islands

== Countries and territories of EU members who did not sign any agreement ==
Singapore, Hong Kong, Bermuda and Barbados did not sign any agreement.

Bermuda, a UK dependent territory was missed out by EU by accident.

== See also ==
- Domicile
- List of sovereign states and dependent territories in Europe
- Offshore bank
- Private bank
- Swiss bank
- US Foreign Account Tax Compliance Act
