= Treasury regulations =

Treasury regulations are the tax regulations issued by the United States Internal Revenue Service (IRS), a bureau of the United States Department of the Treasury. These regulations are the Treasury Department's official interpretations of the Internal Revenue Code and are one source of U.S. federal income tax law.

== Authority and citations ==
Section 7805 of the Internal Revenue Code gives the United States Secretary of the Treasury the power to create the necessary rules and regulations for enforcing the Internal Revenue Code. These regulations are located in Title 26 of the Code of Federal Regulations (CFR).

Each regulation is generally organized to correspond to the Internal Revenue Code section interpreted by that regulation. Citations to Treasury regulations may appear in different formats: for example, the definition of gross income in the regulations may be cited as either "Treas. Reg. § 1.61-1" or "26 C.F.R. § 1.61-1".

== Final and Interpretive Regulations ==
Under this authority, the Secretary of the Treasury can promulgate final regulations. In the process of enacting final regulations, the Treasury issues proposed or temporary regulations. Proposed regulations do not become effective until after comments and testimony are received ("notice and comment"), and a final regulation is issued. Proposed Regulations may offer guidance for a specific section of the Code, and are useful in determining a taxpayer's liability for the given year, although they have limited precedent value. Interpretive Regulations may be dismissed if they are determined to be at variance with the statute; it is not unknown, however, for courts to accord interpretive regulations with "force of law" status. In 2011, the Supreme Court of the United States decision in Mayo Foundation v. United States effected a shift away from the distinction between "Interpretive Regulations," under 7805 and regulations specifically authorized by their corresponding Internal Revenue Code sections. Until Chevron U.S.A., Inc. v. Natural Resources Defense Council, Inc. was overruled in 2024 by Loper Bright Enterprises v. Raimondo, courts evaluated Treasury regulations based on the standard laid out in Chevron, known as the Chevron doctrine.

Temporary regulations are effective upon publication in the Federal Register and may be valid for no more than three years from their date of issuance. Because the notice and comment process can take several months or even years, if the Treasury wants a regulation to become effective more quickly, it will often simultaneously issue a proposed regulation alongside a temporary regulation.

== Publication ==
Proposed Treasury regulations are drafted by the Internal Revenue Service and published in the Federal Register. Proposed Treasury regulations are published so that taxpayers may submit written comments or speak at hearings before final regulations are published. After the notice and comment period, the Final Treasury regulations are then published first in the Federal Register before final publication in the Code of Federal Regulations. Temporary regulations are effective immediately upon publication in the Federal Register. Temporary and final regulations are initially published as Treasury Decisions ("TD"). TDs include an explanatory preamble, which can be a helpful source for legal research. In addition, the IRS publishes TDs in the Internal Revenue Bulletin.

== Parts ==
Title 26 has the following parts:

- Part 1—Income Taxes
- Part 2—Maritime Construction Fund
- Part 3—Capital Construction Fund
- Part 4—Temporary Income Tax Regulations under Section 954 of the Internal Revenue Code
- Part 5—Temporary Income Tax Regulations under the Revenue Act of 1978
- Part 5c—Temporary Income Tax Regulations under the Economic Recovery Tax Act of 1981
- Part 5e—Temporary Income Tax Regulations, Travel Expenses of Members of Congress
- Part 5f—Temporary Income Tax Regulations under the Tax Equity and Fiscal Responsibility Act of 1982
- Part 6a—Temporary Regulations under Title II of the Omnibus Reconciliation Act of 1980
- Part 7—Temporary Income Tax Regulations under the Tax Reform Act of 1976
- Part 8—Temporary Income Tax Regulations under Section 3 of the Act of October 26, 1974
- Part 9—Temporary Income Tax Regulations under the Tax Reduction Act of 1975
- Part 11—Temporary Income Tax Regulations under the Employee Retirement Income Security Act of 1974
- Part 12—Temporary Income Tax Regulations under the Revenue Act of 1971
- Part 13—Temporary Income Tax Regulations under the Tax Reform Act of 1969
- Part 15—Temporary Income Tax Regulations Relating to Exploration Expenditures in the Case of Mining
- Part 15a—Temporary Income Tax Regulations under the Installment Sales Revision Act
- Part 16—Temporary Regulations under the Revenue Act of 1962
- Part 16A—Temporary Income Tax Regulations Relating to the Partial Exclusion for Certain Conservation Cost-Sharing Payments
- Part 18—Temporary Income Tax Regulations under the Subchapter S Revision Act of 1962
- Part 19—Temporary Regulations under the Revenue Act of 1964
- Part 20—Estate Tax; Estates of Decedents Dying after August 16, 1954
- Part 22—Temporary Estate Tax Regulations under the Economic Recovery Act of 1981
- Part 25—Gift Tax; Gifts Made after December 31, 1954
- Part 26—Generation-Skipping Transfer Regulations under the Tax Reform Act of 1986
- Part 31—Employment Taxes and Collection of Income Tax at Source
- Part 32—Temporary Employment Tax Regulations under the Act of December 29, 1981
- Part 35—Employment Tax and Collection of Income Tax at Source Regulations under the Tax Equity and Fiscal Responsibility Act of 1982
- Part 35a—Temporary Employment Tax Regulations under the Interest and Dividend Tax Compliance Act of 1983
- Part 36—Contract Coverage of Employees of Foreign Subsidiaries
- Part 40—Excise Tax Procedural Regulations
- Part 41—Excise Tax on Use of Certain Highway Motor Vehicles
- Part 43—Excise Tax on Transportation by Water
- Part 44—Taxes on Wagering; Effective January 1, 1955
- Part 46—Excise Tax on Certain Insurance Policies, Self-Insured Health Plans, and Obligations Not in Registered Form
- Part 48—Manufacturers and Retailers Excise Taxes
- Part 49—Facilities and Services Excise Taxes
- Part 50—Regulations Relating to the Tax Imposed with Respect to Certain Hydraulic Mining
- Part 51—Branded Prescription Drug Fee
- Part 52—Environmental Taxes
- Part 53—Foundation and Similar Excise Taxes
- Part 54—Pension Excise Taxes
- Part 55—Excise Tax on Real Estate Investment Trusts and Regulated Investment Companies
- Part 56—Public Charity Excise Taxes
- Part 57—Health Insurance Providers Fee
- Part 141—Temporary Excise Tax Regulations under the Employee Retirement Income Security Act of 1974
- Part 143—Temporary Excise Tax Regulations under the Tax Reform Act of 1969
- Part 145—Temporary Excise Tax Regulations under the Highway Revenue Act of 1982 (Pub. L. 97—424)
- Part 148—Certain Excise Tax Matters under the Excise Tax Technical Changes Act of 1958
- Part 156—Excise Tax on Greenmail
- Part 157—Excise Tax on Structured Settlement Factoring Transactions
- Part 300—User Fees
- Part 301—Procedure and Administration
- Part 302—Taxes under the International Claims Settlement Act, as Amended August 9, 1955
- Part 303—Taxes under the Trading with the Enemy Act
- Part 305—Temporary Procedural and Administrative Tax Regulations under the Indian Tribal Governmental Tax Status Act of 1982
- Part 400—Temporary Regulations under the Federal Tax Lien Act of 1966
- Part 403—Disposition of Seized Personal Property
- Part 404—Temporary Regulations on Procedure and Administration under the Tax Reform Act of 1976
- Part 420—Temporary Regulations on Procedure and Administration under the Employee Retirement Income Security Act of 1974
- Part 509—Switzerland
- Part 513—Ireland
- Part 514—France
- Part 521—Denmark
- Part 601—Statement on Procedural Rules
- Part 602—OMB Control Numbers under the Paperwork Reduction Act
- Part 701—Presidential Election Campaign Fund
- Part 702—Presidential Primary Matching Payment Account
- Part 801—Balanced System for Measuring Organizational and Employee Performance within the Internal Revenue Service
