= American Canadians =

Canadians of American descent

Canadiens américains (French)
- American ancestry by census division (2021)

Total population
- + 1,000,000 (by ancestry, Canada 2021 Census)

Regions with significant populations
- Ontario • Western Canada • Atlantic Canada • Quebec

Languages
- French, English, Franglais

American Canadians are Canadians of American descent. The term is most often used to refer to Canadians who migrated from or have ancestry from the United States. This may include people born in the United States who have naturalized as Canadian citizens. Many American Canadians and Canadian Americans hold both US and Canadian citizenship.

== Demography ==
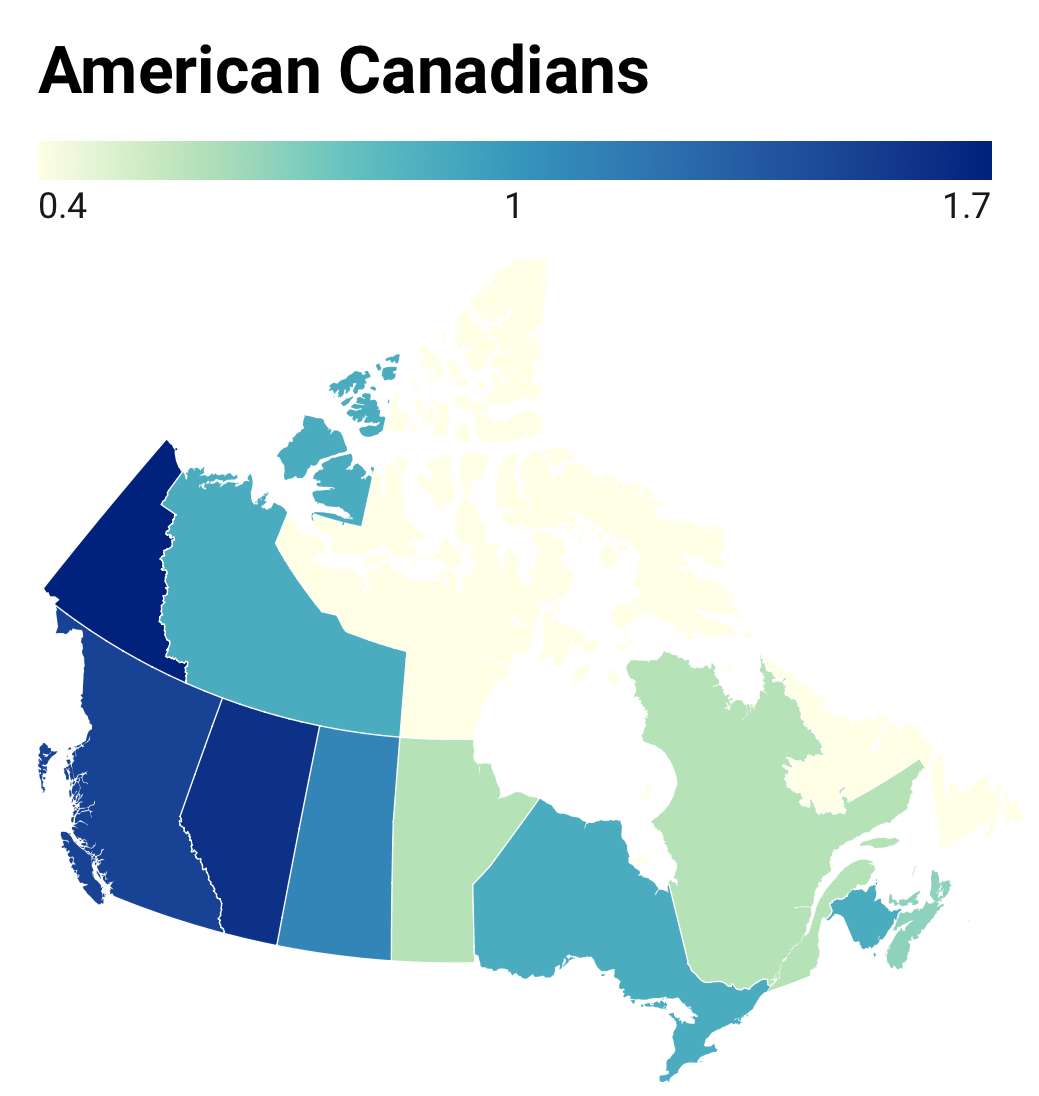
American percent by Canadian province/ethnicity, 2021 census

According to the 2016 Census, 29,590 Canadians reported American as being their singular ethnicity, while 347,810 reported partial ancestry.

== History of Americans in Canada ==
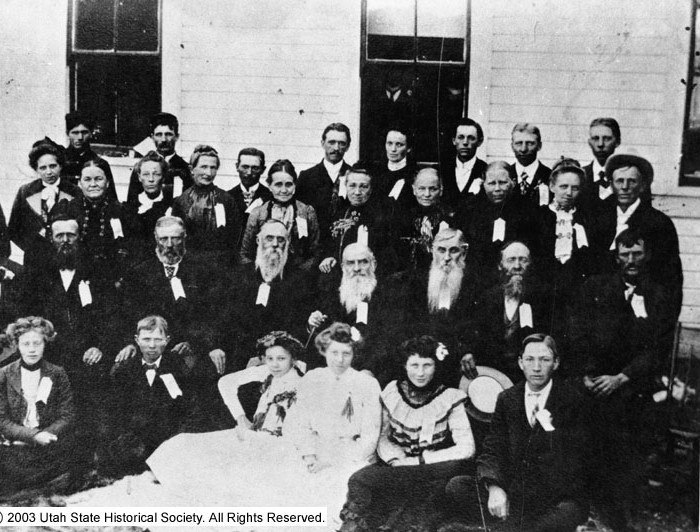
Mormons settling in Cardston, Alberta in 1902

Americans have moved to Canada throughout history. During the American Revolution, many white Americans, 15–25% of the population (300–500,000), loyal to the British crown left the United States and settled in Canada. By 1783, 46,000 had settled in Ontario (10,000) and the Maritimes (36,000). 9.000 lived in the Eastern Townships by 1800. These early settlers were officially designated United Empire Loyalists and referred to as the King's Loyal Americans. Many Black Canadians are descendants of African American slaves (Black Loyalists) who fled to Canada during the American Revolution. Similar waves of American immigrants, 30,000, lured by promises of land if they swore a loyalty oath to the King, settled in Ontario before the War of 1812. The Black Refugees in the War of 1812 also fled to Canada and many American slaves also came via the Underground Railroad, most settling in either Halifax, Nova Scotia or Southern Ontario. At the outbreak of the war of 1812 80,000 of 110,000 inhabitants in Ontario were American born or descendants of Americans. In the Maritimes 110,000 of 135,000 were Americans who settled before 1775 or after and their descendants. This fact gave English-speaking Canada a pronounced American cultural flavor into the 1830s. The difference was political: those who disliked the split with Britain and those who supported it.

In the early 20th century, over 750,000 American settlers moved into the farming regions of the Prairie Provinces of Alberta, Manitoba and Saskatchewan. Many of these were immigrants (or children of immigrants) from Europe or Eastern Canada who had gone to the United States looking for farm land only to find the supply of free farmsteads there exhausted. Others were old-stock European Americans (from the Midwest and Upper South regions of the US), and a small percentage were racial minorities, such as African Americans. In 1916, Americans accounted for 36% of all the foreign-born residents of Alberta, 30% in Saskatchewan, and 8% in Manitoba. or about 400,000 in a total population of the three provinces close to 1.5 million.

During the Vietnam War era, many American draft dodgers fled to Canada to avoid the war. About 10,200 Americans moved to Canada in 2006; this was the highest number since 1977.

== See also ==
- United States
- American English
- Canada–United States border
- Québécois
- United Empire Loyalist
- Canadian Americans
- Black Canadians
