= United States person =

Legal term in U.S. law

The term United States person or US person is used in various contexts in U.S. law and regulations with different meanings. It can refer to natural persons or other entities.

== Data collection and intelligence ==
The term "US person" is used in the context of data collection and intelligence by the United States, particularly with respect to the provisions of the Foreign Intelligence Surveillance Act. If information from, about, or to a US person who is not a named terrorist is captured in the course of U.S. foreign intelligence activities, there are strict rules about preserving the anonymity of such a person in any subsequent intelligence report. Only if the US person information is relevant to the report, is it included. (Note: According to public comments by then-former NSA director Michael V. Hayden in January 2006 speaking to the National Press Club.)

According to the National Security Agency website, federal law and executive order define a United States person as any of the following:

- a citizen of the United States;
- an alien lawfully admitted for permanent residence;
- an unincorporated association with a substantial number of members who are citizens of the United States or are aliens lawfully admitted for permanent residence;
- a corporation that is incorporated in the United States.

== Securities market regulation ==
Regulation S (promulgated under the Securities Act of 1933) in Section 902(k)(1) defines a US person as:

1. Any natural person resident in the United States;
2. Any partnership or corporation organized or incorporated under the laws of the United States;
3. Any estate of which any executor or administrator is a US person;
4. Any trust of which any trustee is a US person;
5. Any agency or branch of a foreign entity located in the United States;
6. Any non-discretionary account or similar account (other than an estate or trust) held by a dealer or other fiduciary for the benefit or account of a US person;
7. Any discretionary account or similar account (other than an estate or trust) held by a dealer or other fiduciary organized, incorporated, or (if an individual) resident in the United States; and
8. Any partnership or corporation if:
  1. Organized or incorporated under the laws of any foreign jurisdiction; and
  2. Formed by a US person principally for the purpose of investing in securities not registered under the Act, unless it is organized or incorporated, and owned, by accredited investors (as defined in Rule 501(a)) who are not natural persons, estates or trusts.

Section 902(k)(2) further defines some persons who are explicitly not US persons. Unlike other definitions of US person, the Regulation S definition of US person does not include US citizens not resident in the US.

== Taxation ==
Internal Revenue Code Section 7701(a)(30) defines a US person as:

1. a citizen or resident of the United States (including a lawful permanent resident residing abroad who has not formally notified United States Citizenship and Immigration Services in order to abandon that status);
2. a domestic partnership;
3. a domestic corporation;
4. any estate (other than a foreign estate, within the meaning of paragraph (31)); and
5. any trust if—
  1. a court within the United States is able to exercise primary supervision over the administration of the trust, and
  2. one or more United States persons have the authority to control all substantial decisions of the trust.

== See also ==
- Americans
- Fourteenth Amendment to the United States Constitution
- United States entity
- Personhood § United States
