= International tax planning =

International tax planning also known as international tax structures or expanded worldwide planning (EWP), is an element of international taxation created to implement directives from several tax authorities following the 2008 worldwide recession.

== History ==
In 2010, the United States introduced the Foreign Account Tax Compliance Act (FATCA). Later the Organisation for Economic Co-operation and Development (OECD) expanded these directives and proposed a new international system for the automatic exchange of information – known as the Common Reporting Standard (CRS). The organisation also attempted to limit companies’ ability to shift profits to low-tax locations, a practice known as base erosion and profit shifting (BEPS). The goal of this worldwide exchange of tax information being tax transparency, it requires the exchange of a significant volume of information. As a result, there are concerns about privacy and data breach in interested industries. EWP has been an important element on the agenda of the OECD following the succession of leaked revelations about various jurisdictions, including the Luxembourg Leaks, Panama Papers and Paradise Papers. In December 2017, European Union finance ministers blacklisted 17 countries for refusing to co-operate in its investigation on tax havens.

== Principles ==
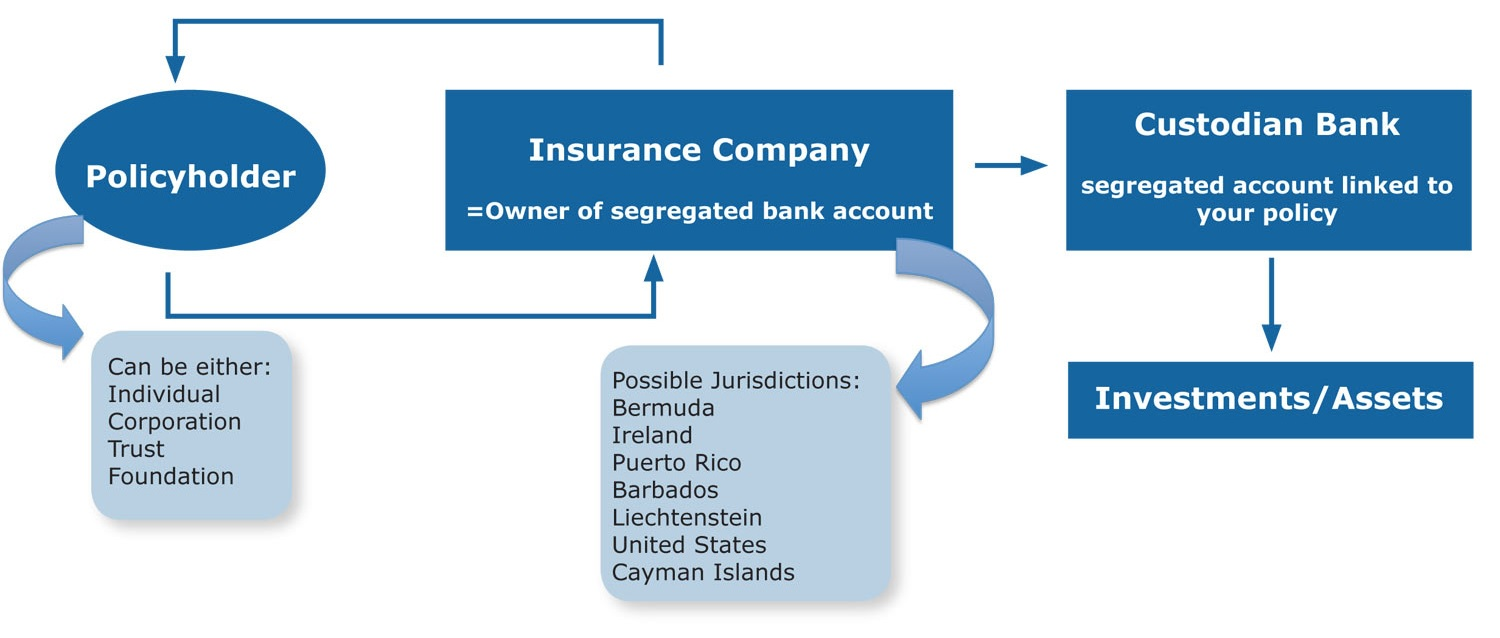

EWP allows a tax paying entity to simplify its existing structures and minimize reporting obligations under the Foreign Account Tax Compliance Act (FATCA) and CRS. At the heart of EWP is a properly constructed Private placement life insurance (PPLI) policy that allows taxpayers to use the regulatory framework of life insurance to structure assets along the client's planning needs. These international assets can also comply with tax authorities worldwide. EWP also brings asset protection and privacy benefits that are set forward in the six principals of EWP below. The other elements in the EWP structure may include the client's citizenship, country of origin, actual residence, insurance regulations of all concerned jurisdictions, tax report requirements, and client's objectives.

Planning with trust and foundations frequently offer only limited tax planning opportunities whereas EWP provides a tax shield. Adding a PPLI policy held by the correct entity in the proper jurisdiction creates a notable planning opportunity.

== Features ==
=== Privacy ===
EWP gives privacy and compliance with tax laws. It also enhances protection from data breach and strengthens family security. EWP allows for a tax compliant system that still respects basic rights of privacy. EWP addresses the concerns of law firms and international planners about some aspects of CRS related to their clients' privacy. EWP assists with the privacy and welfare of families by protecting their financial records and keeping them in compliance with tax regulations.

=== Asset protection ===
EWP protects assets with segregated account legislation by using the benefits of life insurance. This structure uses asset protection laws in the jurisdictions of residence to shield these assets from creditors' claims. A trust with its own asset protection provisions can still receive additional protection with the policy.

=== Succession planning ===
EWP includes transfers of assets without forced heirship rules directly to beneficiaries using a controlled and orderly plan. This element of EWP provides a wealth holder a method to enact an estate plan according to his/her wishes without complying forced heirship rules in the home country. This plan must be coordinated with all the aspects of a properly structured PPLI policy together with other elements of a wealth owner's financial and legal planning.

=== Tax shield ===
EWP adds tax deferral, income, estate tax benefits and dynasty tax planning opportunities. Assets held in a life insurance contract are considered tax-deferred in most jurisdictions throughout the world. Likewise, PPLI policies that are properly constructed shield the assets from all taxes. In most cases, upon the death of the insured, benefits are paid as a tax free death benefit.

=== Compliance simplifier ===
EWP adds ease of reporting to tax authorities and administration of assets, commercial substance to structures. In addition, the insurance company is considered the beneficial owner of the assets. This approach greatly simplifies reporting obligations to tax authorizes because assets in the policy are held in segregated accounts and can be spread over multiple jurisdictions worldwide.

=== Trust substitute ===
EWP creates viable structure under specific insurance regulations for civil law jurisdictions. It also creates a new role for commercial trust companies. In most civil law jurisdictions, trusts are poorly acknowledged and trust law is not well developed. As a result, companies with foreign trusts in these civil law jurisdictions, face obstacles.

== See also ==
- Tax avoidance
- Life insurance tax shelter
- Base erosion and profit shifting
