= International taxation =

Taxation between countries

International taxation is the study or determination of tax on a person or business subject to the tax laws of different countries, or the international aspects of an individual country's tax laws as the case may be. Governments usually limit the scope of their income taxation in some manner territorially or provide for offsets to taxation relating to extraterritorial income. The manner of limitation generally takes the form of a territorial, residence-based, or exclusionary system. Some governments have attempted to mitigate the differing limitations of each of these three broad systems by enacting a hybrid system with characteristics of two or more.

Many governments tax individuals and/or enterprises on income. Such systems of taxation vary widely, and there are no broad general rules. These variations create the potential for double taxation (where the same income is taxed by different countries) and no taxation (where income is not taxed by any country). Income tax systems may impose tax on local income only or on worldwide income. Generally, where worldwide income is taxed, reductions of tax or foreign credits are provided for taxes paid to other jurisdictions. Limits are almost universally imposed on such credits. Multinational corporations usually employ international tax specialists, a specialty among both lawyers and accountants, to decrease their worldwide tax liabilities.

With any system of taxation, it is possible to shift or recharacterize income in a manner that reduces taxation. Jurisdictions often impose rules relating to shifting income among commonly controlled parties, often referred to as transfer pricing rules. Residency-based systems are subject to taxpayer attempts to defer recognition of income through use of related parties. A few jurisdictions impose rules limiting such deferral ("anti-deferral" regimes). Deferral is also specifically authorized by some governments for particular social purposes or other grounds. Agreements among governments (treaties) often attempt to determine who should be entitled to tax what. Most tax treaties provide for at least a skeleton mechanism for resolution of disputes between the parties.

== History ==
The intellectual foundation of the modern international taxation regime was set with a 1923 report prepared by prominent political economists and tax law experts for the League of Nations. The report formulated "general principles" to avoid the adverse effects of double taxation and encourage free trade, international capital flows, and economic growth. For example, the report tried to set guidelines for resolving who would be allowed to tax a resident or citizen of one state when that individual earned income in another state. Prior to the publication of the report, these kinds of questions were primarily decided through unilateral state decisions or bilateral tax treaties.

== Taxation systems ==
Systems of taxation on personal income No income tax on individuals Territorial Residence-based Citizenship-based

Systems of taxation vary among governments, making generalization difficult. Specifics are intended as examples, and relate to particular governments and not broadly recognized multinational rules. Taxes may be levied on varying measures of income, including but not limited to net income under local accounting concepts (in many countries this is referred to as 'profit'), gross receipts, gross margins (sales less costs of sale), or specific categories of receipts less specific categories of reductions. Unless otherwise specified, the term "income" should be read broadly.

Jurisdictions often impose different income-based levies on enterprises than on individuals. Entities are often taxed in a unified manner on all types of income while individuals are taxed in differing manners depending on the nature or source of the income. Many jurisdictions impose tax at both an entity level and at the owner level on one or more types of enterprises. These jurisdictions often rely on the company law of that jurisdiction or other jurisdictions in determining whether an entity's owners are to be taxed directly on the entity income. However, there are notable exceptions, including U.S. rules characterizing entities independently of legal form.

In order to simplify administration or for other agendas, some governments have imposed "deemed" income regimes. These regimes tax some class of taxpayers according to tax system applicable to other taxpayers but based on a deemed level of income, as if received by the taxpayer. Disputes can arise regarding what levy is proper. Procedures for dispute resolution vary widely and enforcement issues are far more complicated in the international arena. The ultimate dispute resolution for a taxpayer is to leave the jurisdiction, taking all property that could be seized. For governments, the ultimate resolution may be confiscation of property, incarceration or dissolution of the entity.

Other major conceptual differences can exist between tax systems. These include, but are not limited to, assessment vs. self-assessment means of determining and collecting tax; methods of imposing sanctions for violation; sanctions unique to international aspects of the system; mechanisms for enforcement and collection of tax; and reporting mechanisms.

Countries that tax income generally use one of two systems: territorial or residence-based. In the territorial system, only local income – income from a source inside the country – is taxed. In the residence-based system, residents of the country are taxed on their worldwide (local and foreign) income, while nonresidents are taxed only on their local income. In addition, a small number of countries also tax the worldwide income of their nonresident citizens in some cases.

Countries with a residence-based system of taxation usually allow deductions or credits for the tax that residents already pay to other countries on their foreign income. Many countries also sign tax treaties with each other to eliminate or reduce double taxation. In the case of corporate income tax, some countries allow an exclusion or deferment of specific items of foreign income from the base of taxation.

=== Individuals ===
The following table summarizes the taxation of local and foreign income of individuals, depending on their residence or citizenship in the country. It includes all United Nations member states and observer states, their inhabited dependent territories (most of which have separate tax systems), and other countries with limited recognition. In the table, income includes any type of income received by individuals, such as work or investment income, and yes means that the country taxes at least one of these types. Resident means a person residing in the country, regardless of citizenship; non-resident citizen means a citizen of the country residing elsewhere, it does not mean non-citizen.

Country or territory	Taxes local income	Taxes foreign income of		Notes and sources
Country or territory	Taxes local income	residents	non-resident citizens	Notes and sources
Antigua and Barbuda	No	No	No	No personal income tax.
Bahamas	No	No	No	No personal income tax.
Bahrain	No	No	No	No personal income tax.
Brunei	No	No	No	No personal income tax.
Cayman Islands	No	No	No	No personal income tax.
Kuwait	No	No	No	No personal income tax.
Monaco	No	No	No	No personal income tax.
Oman	No	No	No	No personal income tax until 1 January 2028 then residence-based taxation.
Pitcairn Islands	No	No	No	No personal income tax.
Qatar	No	No	No	No personal income tax.
Saint Barthélemy	No	No	No	No personal income tax. (Note: New residents of Saint Barthélemy are considered residents of France for tax purposes, for the first five years after moving there. After this period, they become residents of Saint Barthélemy for tax purposes.)
Saint Kitts and Nevis	No	No	No	No personal income tax.
Sark	No	No	No	No personal income tax.
Saudi Arabia	No*	No**	No	No personal income tax. (Note: Saudi Arabia taxes the local business income of its residents who are not citizens of Gulf Cooperation Council countries (Bahrain, Kuwait, Oman, Qatar, Saudi Arabia and the United Arab Emirates) and of nonresidents. It also imposes zakat on the worldwide business income and assets of its residents who are citizens of Gulf Cooperation Council countries. Saudi Arabia does not impose tax or zakat on income or assets that are not related to business activities.) * Except from business activities. ** Except from business activities of citizens of GCC countries.
Turks and Caicos Islands	No	No	No	No personal income tax.
United Arab Emirates	No*	No*	No	No personal income tax. * Except from business activities.
Vanuatu	No	No	No	No personal income tax.
Vatican City	No	No	No	No personal income tax.
Wallis and Futuna	No	No	No	No personal income tax.
Western Sahara	No	No	No	No personal income tax.
North Korea	No*	No**	No	No tax on income of resident citizens, residence-based taxation of foreigners, territorial taxation of nonresident citizens. * Except foreigners and nonresident citizens. ** Except foreigners.
Angola	Yes	No	No	Territorial taxation.
Anguilla	Yes	No	No	Territorial taxation.
Belize	Yes	No	No	Territorial taxation.
Bermuda	Yes	No	No	Territorial taxation.
Bhutan	Yes	No	No	Territorial taxation.
Bolivia	Yes	No	No	Territorial taxation.
Botswana	Yes	No	No	Territorial taxation.
British Virgin Islands	Yes	No	No	Territorial taxation.
Costa Rica	Yes	No*	No	Territorial taxation. * Income declared by foreigners to qualify for a residence permit is subject to mandatory contributions to the Costa Rican Social Security Fund.
Democratic Republic of the Congo	Yes	No	No	Territorial taxation.
Djibouti	Yes	No	No	Territorial taxation.
El Salvador	Yes	No	No	Territorial taxation.
Eswatini	Yes	No	No	Territorial taxation.
Georgia	Yes	No*	No	Territorial taxation. * Payment for services provided by a Georgian resident, even if received from abroad, is generally considered Georgian-source income and thus subject to taxation.
Grenada	Yes	No	No	Territorial Taxation.
Guatemala	Yes	No	No	Territorial taxation.
Guinea-Bissau	Yes	No	No	Territorial taxation.
Honduras	Yes	No	No	Territorial taxation.
Hong Kong	Yes	No	No	Territorial taxation.
Lebanon	Yes	No	No	Territorial taxation.
Libya	Yes	No	No	Territorial taxation.
Macau	Yes	No	No	Territorial taxation.
Malawi	Yes	No	No	Territorial taxation.
Marshall Islands	Yes	No	No	Territorial taxation.
Micronesia	Yes	No	No	Territorial taxation.
Namibia	Yes	No	No	Territorial taxation.
Nauru	Yes	No	No	Territorial taxation.
Nicaragua	Yes	No	No	Territorial taxation.
Palau	Yes	No	No	Territorial taxation.
Palestine	Yes	No	No	Territorial taxation.
Panama	Yes	No	No	Territorial taxation.
Paraguay	Yes	No	No	Territorial taxation.
Saint Helena, Ascension and Tristan da Cunha	Yes	No	No	Territorial taxation. (Note: Saint Helena, Ascension Island and Tristan da Cunha are separate tax jurisdictions. All of them tax only local income.)
Seychelles	Yes	No	No	Territorial taxation.
Singapore	Yes	No	No	Territorial taxation.
Somalia	Yes	No	No	Territorial taxation.
Syria	Yes	No	No	Territorial taxation.
Tokelau	Yes	No	No	Territorial taxation.
Tuvalu	Yes	No	No	Territorial taxation.
Zambia	Yes	No	No	Territorial taxation.
Iran	Yes	Yes*	No	Residence-based taxation of citizens, territorial taxation of foreigners. * Except foreigners.
Iraq	Yes	Yes*	No	Residence-based taxation of citizens, territorial taxation of foreigners. * Except foreigners.
Philippines	Yes	Yes*	No	Residence-based taxation of citizens, territorial taxation of foreigners. * Except foreigners.
Abkhazia	Yes	Yes	No	Residence-based taxation.
Afghanistan	Yes	Yes	No	Residence-based taxation.
Akrotiri and Dhekelia	Yes	Yes	No	Residence-based taxation.
Albania	Yes	Yes	No	Residence-based taxation.
Algeria	Yes	Yes	No	Residence-based taxation.
American Samoa	Yes	Yes	No	Residence-based taxation.
Andorra	Yes	Yes	No	Residence-based taxation.
Argentina	Yes	Yes	No	Residence-based taxation.
Armenia	Yes	Yes	No	Residence-based taxation.
Aruba	Yes	Yes	No	Residence-based taxation.
Australia (including Christmas Island, Cocos (Keeling) Islands and Norfolk Island)	Yes	Yes*	No	Residence-based taxation. * Except temporary residents.
Austria	Yes	Yes	No	Residence-based taxation.
Azerbaijan	Yes	Yes	No	Residence-based taxation.
Bangladesh	Yes	Yes	No	Residence-based taxation.
Barbados	Yes	Yes	No	Residence-based taxation.
Belarus	Yes	Yes	No	Residence-based taxation.
Belgium	Yes	Yes	No	Residence-based taxation.
Benin	Yes	Yes	No	Residence-based taxation.
Bosnia and Herzegovina	Yes	Yes	No	Residence-based taxation. (Note: The Federation of Bosnia and Herzegovina, Republika Srpska and Brčko District are separate tax jurisdictions. All of them tax worldwide income of residents and local income of nonresidents.)
Brazil	Yes	Yes	No	Residence-based taxation.
Bulgaria	Yes	Yes	No	Residence-based taxation.
Burkina Faso	Yes	Yes	No	Residence-based taxation.
Burundi	Yes	Yes	No	Residence-based taxation.
Cambodia	Yes	Yes	No	Residence-based taxation.
Cameroon	Yes	Yes	No	Residence-based taxation.
Canada	Yes	Yes	No	Residence-based taxation.
Cape Verde	Yes	Yes	No	Residence-based taxation.
Central African Republic	Yes	Yes	No	Residence-based taxation.
Chad	Yes	Yes	No	Residence-based taxation.
Chile	Yes	Yes	No	Residence-based taxation.
China	Yes	Yes	No	Residence-based taxation.
Colombia	Yes	Yes	No	Residence-based taxation.
Comoros	Yes	Yes	No	Residence-based taxation.
Congo	Yes	Yes	No	Residence-based taxation.
Cook Islands	Yes	Yes	No	Residence-based taxation.
Croatia	Yes	Yes	No	Residence-based taxation.
Cuba	Yes	Yes	No	Residence-based taxation.
Curaçao	Yes	Yes	No	Residence-based taxation.
Cyprus	Yes	Yes*	No	Residence-based taxation. * For certain investment income, only if domiciled in Cyprus.
Czech Republic	Yes	Yes	No	Residence-based taxation.
Denmark	Yes	Yes	No	Residence-based taxation.
Dominica	Yes	Yes	No	Residence-based taxation.
Dominican Republic	Yes	Yes	No	Residence-based taxation.
East Timor	Yes	Yes	No	Residence-based taxation.
Ecuador	Yes	Yes	No	Residence-based taxation.
Egypt	Yes	Yes	No	Residence-based taxation.
Equatorial Guinea	Yes	Yes	No	Residence-based taxation.
Estonia	Yes	Yes	No	Residence-based taxation.
Ethiopia	Yes	Yes	No	Residence-based taxation.
Falkland Islands	Yes	Yes	No	Residence-based taxation.
Faroe Islands	Yes	Yes	No	Residence-based taxation.
Fiji	Yes	Yes	No	Residence-based taxation.
Finland (including Åland)	Yes	Yes	No*	Residence-based taxation. * Except former residents, temporarily.
France (including overseas departments)	Yes	Yes	No*	Residence-based taxation. * Except in Monaco.
French Polynesia	Yes	Yes	No	Residence-based taxation.
Gabon	Yes	Yes	No	Residence-based taxation.
Gambia	Yes	Yes	No	Residence-based taxation.
Germany	Yes	Yes	No	Residence-based taxation.
Ghana	Yes	Yes	No	Residence-based taxation.
Gibraltar	Yes	Yes	No	Residence-based taxation.
Greece	Yes	Yes	No	Residence-based taxation.
Greenland	Yes	Yes	No	Residence-based taxation.
Guernsey (including Alderney)	Yes	Yes	No	Residence-based taxation. (Note: Guernsey and Alderney form one tax jurisdiction, which taxes worldwide income of residents and local income of nonresidents. Sark is a separate tax jurisdiction, which does not tax income but taxes worldwide assets of residents and local assets of nonresidents.)
Guinea	Yes	Yes	No	Residence-based taxation.
Guyana	Yes	Yes	No	Residence-based taxation.
Haiti	Yes	Yes	No	Residence-based taxation.
Iceland	Yes	Yes	No	Residence-based taxation.
India	Yes	Yes	No	Residence-based taxation.
Indonesia	Yes	Yes	No	Residence-based taxation.
Ireland	Yes	Yes*	No	Residence-based taxation. * Only if domiciled in Ireland or if the income is remitted to Ireland.
Isle of Man	Yes	Yes	No	Residence-based taxation.
Israel	Yes	Yes	No	Residence-based taxation.
Italy	Yes	Yes	No*	Residence-based taxation. * Except in tax havens.
Ivory Coast	Yes	Yes	No	Residence-based taxation.
Jamaica	Yes	Yes	No	Residence-based taxation.
Japan	Yes	Yes*	No	Residence-based taxation. * Only citizens and permanent residents.
Jersey	Yes	Yes	No	Residence-based taxation.
Jordan	Yes	Yes	No	Residence-based taxation.
Kazakhstan	Yes	Yes	No	Residence-based taxation.
Kenya	Yes	Yes	No	Residence-based taxation.
Kiribati	Yes	Yes	No	Residence-based taxation.
Kosovo	Yes	Yes	No	Residence-based taxation.
Laos	Yes	Yes	No	Residence-based taxation.
Latvia	Yes	Yes	No	Residence-based taxation.
Lesotho	Yes	Yes	No	Residence-based taxation.
Liberia	Yes	Yes	No	Residence-based taxation.
Liechtenstein	Yes	Yes	No	Residence-based taxation.
Lithuania	Yes	Yes	No	Residence-based taxation.
Luxembourg	Yes	Yes	No	Residence-based taxation.
Madagascar	Yes	Yes	No	Residence-based taxation.
Malaysia	Yes	Yes*	No	Residence-based taxation. * Only if the income is remitted into Malaysia, with an exemption until 31 December 2036.
Maldives	Yes	Yes	No	Residence-based taxation.
Mali	Yes	Yes	No	Residence-based taxation.
Malta	Yes	Yes*	No	Residence-based taxation. * Only if domiciled in Malta or if the income is remitted to Malta.
Mauritania	Yes	Yes	No	Residence-based taxation.
Mauritius	Yes	Yes*	No	Residence-based taxation. * Only if the income is remitted to Mauritius.
Mexico	Yes	Yes	No*	Residence-based taxation. * Except in tax havens, temporarily.
Moldova	Yes	Yes	No	Residence-based taxation.
Mongolia	Yes	Yes	No	Residence-based taxation.
Montenegro	Yes	Yes	No	Residence-based taxation.
Montserrat	Yes	Yes	No	Residence-based taxation.
Morocco	Yes	Yes	No	Residence-based taxation.
Mozambique	Yes	Yes	No	Residence-based taxation.
Nepal	Yes	Yes	No	Residence-based taxation.
Netherlands (including the Caribbean Netherlands)	Yes	Yes	No	Residence-based taxation. (Note: The European and Caribbean Netherlands are separate tax jurisdictions. Both tax worldwide income of residents and local income of nonresidents.)
New Caledonia	Yes	Yes	No	Residence-based taxation.
New Zealand	Yes	Yes	No	Residence-based taxation.
Niger	Yes	Yes	No	Residence-based taxation.
Nigeria	Yes	Yes	No	Residence-based taxation.
Niue	Yes	Yes	No	Residence-based taxation.
North Macedonia	Yes	Yes	No	Residence-based taxation.
Northern Cyprus	Yes	Yes	No	Residence-based taxation.
Norway	Yes	Yes	No*	Residence-based taxation. * Except former residents, temporarily.
Pakistan	Yes	Yes	No	Residence-based taxation.
Papua New Guinea	Yes	Yes	No	Residence-based taxation.
Peru	Yes	Yes	No	Residence-based taxation.
Poland	Yes	Yes	No	Residence-based taxation.
Portugal	Yes	Yes	No*	Residence-based taxation. * Except in tax havens, temporarily.
Puerto Rico	Yes	Yes	No	Residence-based taxation. (Note: Puerto Rico does not tax foreign income of nonresident citizens. However, Puerto Rican citizens are also United States citizens, and the United States taxes their worldwide income regardless of where they live.)
Romania	Yes	Yes	No	Residence-based taxation.
Russia	Yes	Yes	No	Residence-based taxation.
Rwanda	Yes	Yes	No	Residence-based taxation.
Saint Lucia	Yes	Yes	No	Residence-based taxation.
Saint Martin	Yes	Yes	No	Residence-based taxation. (Note: Residents of France who move to Saint Martin are not considered residents of Saint Martin for tax purposes, and continue to be taxed as residents of France, for the first five years after moving there. After this period, they become residents of Saint Martin for tax purposes.)
Saint Pierre and Miquelon	Yes	Yes	No	Residence-based taxation.
Saint Vincent and the Grenadines	Yes	Yes	No	Residence-based taxation.
Samoa	Yes	Yes	No	Residence-based taxation.
San Marino	Yes	Yes	No	Residence-based taxation.
São Tomé and Príncipe	Yes	Yes	No	Residence-based taxation.
Senegal	Yes	Yes	No	Residence-based taxation.
Serbia	Yes	Yes	No	Residence-based taxation.
Sierra Leone	Yes	Yes	No	Residence-based taxation.
Sint Maarten	Yes	Yes	No	Residence-based taxation.
Slovakia	Yes	Yes	No	Residence-based taxation.
Slovenia	Yes	Yes	No	Residence-based taxation.
Solomon Islands	Yes	Yes	No	Residence-based taxation.
Somaliland	Yes	Yes	No	Residence-based taxation.
South Africa	Yes	Yes	No	Residence-based taxation.
South Korea	Yes	Yes	No	Residence-based taxation.
South Ossetia	Yes	Yes	No	Residence-based taxation.
South Sudan	Yes	Yes	No	Residence-based taxation.
Spain	Yes	Yes	No*	Residence-based taxation. * Except in tax havens, temporarily.
Sri Lanka	Yes	Yes	No	Residence-based taxation.
Sudan	Yes	Yes	No	Residence-based taxation.
Suriname	Yes	Yes	No	Residence-based taxation.
Svalbard	Yes	Yes	No	Residence-based taxation.
Sweden	Yes	Yes	No*	Residence-based taxation. * Except former residents, temporarily.
Switzerland	Yes	Yes	No	Residence-based taxation.
Taiwan	Yes	Yes	No	Territorial taxation in general, but residence-based taxation under the alternative minimum tax.
Tanzania	Yes	Yes	No	Residence-based taxation.
Thailand	Yes	Yes*	No	Residence-based taxation. * Only if the income is remitted to Thailand.
Togo	Yes	Yes	No	Residence-based taxation.
Tonga	Yes	Yes	No	Residence-based taxation.
Transnistria	Yes	Yes	No	Residence-based taxation.
Trinidad and Tobago	Yes	Yes	No	Residence-based taxation.
Tunisia	Yes	Yes	No	Residence-based taxation.
Turkey	Yes	Yes	No*	Residence-based taxation. * Except income not taxed by other countries of employees of Turkish government or companies.
Turkmenistan	Yes	Yes	No	Residence-based taxation.
Uganda	Yes	Yes	No	Residence-based taxation.
Ukraine	Yes	Yes	No	Residence-based taxation.
United Kingdom	Yes	Yes	No	Residence-based taxation.
United States Virgin Islands	Yes	Yes	No	Residence-based taxation. (Note: The United States Virgin Islands do not tax foreign income of nonresident citizens. However, citizens of the United States Virgin Islands are also United States citizens, and the United States taxes their worldwide income regardless of where they live.)
Uruguay	Yes	Yes	No	Residence-based taxation.
Uzbekistan	Yes	Yes	No	Residence-based taxation.
Venezuela	Yes	Yes	No	Residence-based taxation.
Vietnam	Yes	Yes	No	Residence-based taxation.
Yemen	Yes	Yes	No	Residence-based taxation.
Zimbabwe	Yes	Yes	No	Residence-based taxation.
Eritrea	Yes	No	Yes	Territorial and citizenship-based taxation. Foreign income of nonresident citizens is taxed at a reduced flat rate.
Hungary	Yes	Yes	Yes*	Residence-based and citizenship-based taxation. Nonresident citizens not satisfying exceptions are taxed in the same manner as residents. * Except dual nationals and residents of countries with whom Hungary has double taxation treaties.
Kyrgyzstan	Yes	Yes*	Yes	Citizenship-based and partial residence-based taxation. Non-resident citizens are taxed in the same manner as resident citizens. * Resident aliens without residency permit or kairylman (alien compatriot) status are only taxed on natural person entrepreneur income from foreign sources.
Myanmar	Yes	Yes	Yes	Residence-based and citizenship-based taxation. Foreign income of nonresident citizens is taxed in the same manner as residents or at a reduced flat rate.
Tajikistan	Yes	Yes	Yes	Residence-based and citizenship-based taxation. Nonresident citizens are taxed in the same manner as residents.
United States (including Guam and the Northern Mariana Islands)	Yes	Yes	Yes	Residence-based and citizenship-based taxation. Nonresident citizens are taxed in the same manner as residents, but with a limited exemption for foreign income from work. (Note: Guam and the Northern Mariana Islands use the same income tax code as the United States, but each territory administers it separately. In the case of nonresident citizens, individuals who acquired United States citizenship by a connection to Guam or the Northern Mariana Islands are taxed by the respective territory, instead of by the United States.)

==== Residency ====
Taxing regimes are generally classified as either residence-based or territorial. Most jurisdictions tax income on a residency basis. They need to define "resident" and characterize the income of nonresidents. Such definitions vary by country and type of taxpayer, but usually involve the location of the person's main home and number of days the person is physically present in the country. Examples include:

- Spain considers as a resident a person who remains in Spain for more than 183 days in a calendar year or whose main base of activities or economic interests is in Spain.
- Switzerland residency may be established by having a permit to be employed in Switzerland for an individual who is so employed.
- The United Kingdom, prior to 2013, established three categories: non-resident, resident, and resident but not ordinarily resident. From 2013, the categories of resident are limited to non-resident and resident. Residency is established by application of the tests in the Statutory Residency Test.
- The United States taxes its citizens as residents, and provides lengthy, detailed rules for individual residency of foreigners, covering:
  - periods establishing residency (including a formulary calculation involving three years);
  - start and end date of residency;
  - exceptions for transitory visits, medical conditions, etc.

==== Citizenship ====
In the vast majority of countries, citizenship is completely irrelevant for taxation. Very few countries tax the foreign income of non-resident citizens in general:

- Eritrea taxes the foreign income of its non-resident citizens at a reduced flat rate of 2% (income tax rates for local income are progressive from 2 to 30%). It has been reported that Eritrea enforces this tax on its citizens abroad through denial of passports, denial of entry or exit from the country, confiscation of assets in Eritrea, and even harassment of relatives living in Eritrea, until the tax is paid. In 2011, the United Nations Security Council passed a resolution condemning the collection of the Eritrean 'diaspora tax'. The governments of Canada and the Netherlands expelled Eritrean diplomats in 2013 and 2018, respectively, for collecting the tax. The parliaments of Sweden and the European Union have also expressed their intention to prohibit the practice there.
- Hungary considers all of its non-resident citizens as tax residents, except those who hold another nationality. It taxes the worldwide income of its non-resident citizens using the same tax rates as for residents. However, it may not tax the foreign income of those who reside in countries that have tax treaties with Hungary, based on the type of income and provided all other treaty requirements are met, which usually infer legal residence in a single treaty country for most of the year. (Note: As of 2026, Hungary has tax treaties with the following countries and territories: Albania, Andorra, Armenia, Australia, Austria, Azerbaijan, Bahrain, Belarus, Belgium, Bosnia and Herzegovina, Brazil, Bulgaria, Canada, China, Croatia, Cyprus, Czech Republic, Denmark, Egypt, Estonia, Finland, France, Georgia, Germany, Greece, Hong Kong, Iceland, India, Indonesia, Iran, Iraq, Ireland, Israel, Italy, Japan, Kazakhstan, Kosovo, Kuwait, Kyrgyzstan, Latvia, Liechtenstein, Lithuania, Luxembourg, Malaysia, Malta, Mexico, Moldova, Mongolia, Montenegro, Morocco, Netherlands, North Macedonia, Norway, Oman, Pakistan, Philippines, Poland, Portugal, Qatar, Romania, Russia, San Marino, Saudi Arabia, Serbia, Singapore, Slovakia, Slovenia, South Africa, South Korea, Spain, Sweden, Switzerland, Taiwan, Thailand, Tunisia, Turkey, Turkmenistan, Ukraine, United Arab Emirates, United Kingdom, Uruguay, Uzbekistan, Vietnam.) Nonresident citizens who do not satisfy these exceptions are taxed in the same manner as residents, at a flat rate of 15% on worldwide income, in addition to mandatory contributions of up to 18.5% on certain types of income. There is no minimum allowance or its equivalent in Hungary, meaning that all income is taxed. With its citizenship-based taxation, universal filing requirements and no allowance policy, the Hungarian tax regime is unique in the world.
- Kyrgyzstan taxes the worldwide income of non-resident citizens in the same manner as resident citizens. However, it may not tax the foreign income of those who reside in countries that have tax treaties with Kyrgyzstan. (Note: As of 2025, Kyrgyzstan has tax treaties with the following countries: Armenia, Austria, Azerbaijan, Belarus, Canada, China, Czech Republic, Estonia, Finland, Georgia, Germany, Hungary, India, Iran, Kazakhstan, Kuwait, Latvia, Lithuania, Malaysia, Moldova, Mongolia, Netherlands, Pakistan, Poland, Qatar, Russia, Saudi Arabia, Slovakia, South Korea, Switzerland, Tajikistan, Turkey, Turkmenistan, Ukraine, United Arab Emirates, United Kingdom, Uzbekistan.)
- Myanmar taxes the salaries of its non-resident citizens in the same manner as for residents, with deductions and progressive rates up to 25%, or with no deductions and a flat rate of 2%, whichever results in a lower tax. It also taxes their foreign income other than salaries at a flat rate of 10%. Tax paid to other countries on the same income may be used as a credit against the tax imposed by Myanmar.
- Tajikistan considers all of its citizens as residents for tax purposes, and taxes the worldwide income of its residents. However, it may not tax the foreign income of those who reside in countries that have tax treaties with Tajikistan. (Note: As of 2025, Tajikistan has tax treaties with the following countries: Armenia, Austria, Azerbaijan, Bahrain, Belarus, Belgium, Brunei, China, Czech Republic, Finland, Germany, India, Indonesia, Iran, Jordan, Kazakhstan, Kuwait, Kyrgyzstan, Latvia, Luxembourg, Moldova, Pakistan, Poland, Qatar, Romania, Russia, Saudi Arabia, South Korea, Switzerland, Thailand, Turkey, Turkmenistan, Ukraine, United Arab Emirates, United Kingdom, Uzbekistan.)
- The United States taxes the worldwide income of its non-resident citizens using the same tax rates as for residents. To mitigate double taxation, non-resident citizens may exclude some of their foreign income from work from U.S. taxation and take credit for income tax paid to other countries, and those residing in some countries with tax treaties may also exclude a few types of foreign income from U.S. taxation, but they must still file a U.S. tax return to claim the exclusion or credit even if they result in no tax liability. U.S. citizens abroad, like U.S. residents, are defined as "U.S. persons" and thus are also subject to various reporting requirements regarding foreign finances, such as FBAR, FATCA, and IRS forms 3520, 5471, 8621 and 8938. The penalties for failure to file these forms on time are often much higher than the penalties for not paying the tax itself and are far more punitive for non-residents than for U.S. residents.

Like Eritrea, enforcement tactics used by the U.S. government to facilitate tax compliance include the denial of U.S. passports to non-resident U.S. citizens deemed to be delinquent taxpayers and the potential seizure of any U.S. accounts and/or U.S.-based assets. The IRS can also exert substantial compliance pressure on non-resident citizens as a result of the FATCA legislation passed in 2010, which compels foreign banks to disclose U.S. account holders or face crippling fines on U.S.-related financial transactions. Unlike Eritrea, the U.S. has faced little international backlash related to its global enforcement tactics. For example, unlike their response to Eritrea's collection efforts, Canada and all EU member states have ratified intergovernmental agreements (IGAs) facilitating FATCA compliance and supporting the U.S. global tax regime in place for U.S. citizens (including dual nationals). The implementation of these IGAs has led to a substantial increase in U.S. citizenship renunciations, hitting a record 6,707 renunciations in 2020, up 237% from the year before. Increasingly, numerous organizations representing Americans abroad including American Citizens Abroad, the Association of Accidental Americans, the Association of Americans Resident Overseas, Democrats Abroad, Republicans Overseas, Stop Extraterritorial American Taxation and Tax Fairness for Americans Abroad are lobbying Congress to switch to residence-based taxation in order to free Americans abroad from what they call discriminatory and unfair rules.

Several countries tax based on citizenship in specific situations:

- Finland continues taxing its citizens who move from Finland to another country as residents of Finland, for the first three years after moving there, unless they demonstrate that they no longer have any ties to Finland. After this period, they are no longer considered residents of Finland for tax purposes.
- France taxes its citizens who move to Monaco as residents of France, according to a treaty signed between the two countries in 1963. However, those who have lived in Monaco continuously since 1957 or since their birth, or who also hold Monégasque nationality, among other cases, are not subject to taxation as residents of France.
- Italy continues taxing its citizens who change their registered residence from Italy to a tax haven (Note: As of 2026, the following countries and territories are considered tax havens by Italy: Andorra, Anguilla, Antigua and Barbuda, Aruba, Bahamas, Bahrain, Barbados, Belize, Bermuda, British Virgin Islands, Brunei, Caribbean Netherlands (Bonaire, Saba, Sint Eustatius), Cayman Islands, Cook Islands, Costa Rica, Curaçao, Djibouti, Dominica, Ecuador, French Polynesia, Gibraltar, Grenada, Guernsey (including Alderney and Sark), Hong Kong, Isle of Man, Jersey, Lebanon, Liberia, Liechtenstein, Macau, Malaysia, Maldives, Marshall Islands, Mauritius, Monaco, Montserrat, Nauru, Niue, Oman, Panama, Philippines, Saint Kitts and Nevis, Saint Lucia, Saint Vincent and the Grenadines, Samoa, Seychelles, Singapore, Sint Maarten, Taiwan, Tonga, Turks and Caicos Islands, Tuvalu, United Arab Emirates, Uruguay, Vanuatu.) as residents of Italy, unless they demonstrate that they actually reside in the other country.
- Japan levies inheritance and gift taxes on a worldwide basis for a period of 10 years after residence in Japan ends. These "look back" wealth taxes apply to Japanese citizens and certain other prior residents of Japan.
- Mexico continues taxing its citizens who move from Mexico to a tax haven (Note: This provision applies to income whose tax in the new country of residence is lower than 75% of the tax that the person would have paid as a resident of Mexico. However, the provision does not apply if the country has a treaty to share tax information with Mexico.) as residents of Mexico, for the first five years after moving there. After this period, they are no longer considered residents of Mexico for tax purposes.
- The Netherlands taxes the worldwide inheritance and gifts left by its citizens for the first 10 years after moving from the Netherlands to another country, as if they remained residents of the Netherlands.
- Portugal taxes its citizens who move to a tax haven (Note: As of 2026, the following countries and territories are considered tax havens by Portugal: American Samoa, Anguilla, Antigua and Barbuda, Aruba, Bahamas, Bahrain, Barbados, Belize, Bermuda, Bolivia, British Virgin Islands, Brunei, Caribbean Netherlands (Bonaire, Saba, Sint Eustatius), Cayman Islands, Christmas Island, Cocos (Keeling) Islands, Cook Islands, Costa Rica, Curaçao, Djibouti, Dominica, Eswatini, Falkland Islands, Fiji, French Polynesia, Gambia, Gibraltar, Grenada, Guam, Guernsey (including Alderney and Sark), Guyana, Honduras, Isle of Man, Jamaica, Jersey, Jordan, Kiribati, Kuwait, Labuan, Lebanon, Liberia, Maldives, Marshall Islands, Mauritius, Monaco, Montserrat, Nauru, Niue, Norfolk Island, Northern Mariana Islands, Oman, Palau, Panama, Pitcairn Islands, Puerto Rico, Qatar, Qeshm, Saint Helena, Ascension and Tristan da Cunha, Saint Kitts and Nevis, Saint Lucia, Saint Pierre and Miquelon, Saint Vincent and the Grenadines, Samoa, San Marino, Seychelles, Sint Maarten, Solomon Islands, Svalbard, Tokelau, Tonga, Trinidad and Tobago, Turks and Caicos Islands, Tuvalu, United Arab Emirates, United States Virgin Islands, Vanuatu, Yemen, and other Pacific islands (Micronesia, New Caledonia, Wallis and Futuna).) as residents of Portugal, for the first five years after moving there, unless they demonstrate that they moved for an acceptable reason. After this period, they are no longer considered residents of Portugal for tax purposes.
- Singapore requires its citizens and Singapore Permanent Residents born in 1980 or later to pay CareShield Life premiums no matter where they reside. CareShield Life is a government-operated disability insurance program. Severely disabled claimants can receive monthly cash benefits for life. The premiums (social insurance taxes) are owed from age 30 (or age of entry if later) to age 67 and are reduced or waived for low income Singaporean citizens. If Singaporean citizenship or Singapore Permanent Residence ends (is lost or terminated) then the CareShield Life coverage also ends, and there are no premium refunds. Singapore also requires its citizens and Permanent Residents to pay MediShield Life (basic hospitalization insurance) premiums no matter where they live, but Singaporean citizens can opt out of MediShield Life after 5 years of overseas residence.
- Spain continues taxing its citizens who move from Spain to a tax haven (Note: As of 2026, the following countries and territories are considered tax havens by Spain: American Samoa, Anguilla, Bahrain, Barbados, Bermuda, British Virgin Islands, Cayman Islands, Dominica, Falkland Islands, Fiji, Gibraltar, Guam, Guernsey, Isle of Man, Jersey, Northern Mariana Islands, Palau, Samoa, Seychelles, Solomon Islands, Trinidad and Tobago, Turks and Caicos Islands, United States Virgin Islands, Vanuatu.) as residents of Spain, for the first five years after moving there. After this period, they are no longer considered residents of Spain for tax purposes.
- Sweden continues taxing its citizens (as well as foreigners who lived there for at least ten years) who move from Sweden to another country as residents of Sweden, for the first five years after moving there, unless they demonstrate that they no longer have essential connections to Sweden. After this period, they are no longer considered residents of Sweden for tax purposes.
- Turkey taxes its citizens who are residing abroad to work for the Turkish government or Turkish companies as residents of Turkey, but exempts their income that is already taxed by the country of origin.

A few other countries used to tax the foreign income of nonresident citizens, but have abolished this practice:

- Romania used to tax the worldwide income of its citizens regardless of where they resided, but abandoned this practice some time between 1933 and 1954.
- Mexico used to tax its citizens in the same manner as residents, on worldwide income. A new income tax law, passed in 1980 and effective 1981, determined only residence as the basis for taxation of worldwide income. However, since 2006 Mexico taxes based on citizenship in limited situations (see above).
- Bulgaria used to tax its citizens on worldwide income, regardless of where they resided. A new income tax law, passed in 1997 and effective 1998, determined residence as the basis for taxation of worldwide income.
- The Philippines used to tax the foreign income of non-resident citizens at reduced rates of 1 to 3% (income tax rates for residents were 1 to 35% at the time). It abolished this practice in a new revenue code in 1997, effective 1998.
- Vietnam used to tax its citizens in the same manner as residents, on worldwide income. The country passed a personal income tax law in 2007, effective 2009, removing citizenship as a criterion to determine residence.

In Iran, Iraq, North Korea, the Philippines, and Saudi Arabia, citizenship is relevant for the taxation of residents but not for non-residents.

==== Special temporary regimes ====
Some jurisdictions offer special temporary regimes for new or recently arrived residents under which foreign income and gains may be exempt, taxed only on remittance, or covered by a fixed annual substitute tax; examples include Israel, Italy, Greece, Poland, Portugal, the United Kingdom, Uruguay, China, Japan, and lump-sum taxation in some Swiss cantons.

==== Other ====
There are some arrangements for international taxation that are not based on residency or citizenship:

- United Kingdom imposes global income tax on anyone who owes UK student loans. These are not true loans, but borrowings to be repaid through an additional 9% income tax, levied above a certain income threshold, until the balance of the loan expires in 30 years. The interest rate is expressed as a punitive addition to the UK Retail Price Index inflation rate (e.g. RPI + 3%), so the value of the loan cannot be inflated away. The loan cannot be repudiated by declaring bankruptcy. The income tax is imposed irrespective of citizenship or residency, which means the UK HMRC must track the location and income of all loan holders, wherever they are in the world, for several decades.

=== Corporations ===
Countries do not necessarily use the same system of taxation for individuals and corporations. For example, France uses a residence-based system for individuals but a territorial system for corporations, while Singapore does the opposite, and Brunei and Monaco taxes corporate but not personal income.

==== Exclusion ====
Many systems provide for specific exclusions from taxable (chargeable) income. For example, several countries, notably the United States, Cyprus, Luxembourg, Netherlands and Spain, have enacted holding company regimes that exclude from income dividends from certain foreign subsidiaries of corporations. These systems generally impose tax on other sorts of income, such as interest or royalties, from the same subsidiaries. They also typically have requirements for portion and time of ownership in order to qualify for exclusion. The United States excludes dividends received by U.S. corporations from non-U.S. subsidiaries, as well as 50% of the deemed remittance of aggregate income of non-U.S. subsidiaries in excess of an aggregate 10% return on tangible depreciable assets. The Netherlands offers a "participation exemption" for dividends from subsidiaries of Netherlands companies. Dividends from all Dutch subsidiaries automatically qualify. For other dividends to qualify, the Dutch shareholder or affiliates must own at least 5% and the subsidiary must be subject to a certain level of income tax locally.

Some countries, such as Singapore, allow deferment of tax on foreign income of resident corporations until it is remitted to the country.

== Individuals versus enterprises ==
Many tax systems tax individuals in one manner and entities that are not considered fiscally transparent in another. The differences may be as simple as differences in tax rates, and are often motivated by concerns unique to either individuals or corporations. For example, many systems allow taxable income of an individual to be reduced by a fixed amount allowance for other persons supported by the individual (dependents). Such a concept is not relevant for enterprises.

Many systems allow for fiscal transparency of certain forms of enterprise. For example, most countries tax partners of a partnership, rather than the partnership itself, on income of the partnership. A common feature of income taxation is imposition of a levy on certain enterprises in certain forms followed by an additional levy on owners of the enterprise upon distribution of such income. For example, the U.S. imposes two levels of tax on foreign individuals or foreign corporations who own a U.S. corporation. First, the U.S. corporation is subject to the regular income tax on its profits, then subject to an additional 30% tax on the dividends paid to foreign shareholders (the branch profits tax). The foreign corporation will be subject to U.S. income tax on its effectively connected income, and will also be subject to the branch profits tax on any of its profits not reinvested in the U.S. Thus, many countries tax corporations under company tax rules and tax individual shareholders upon corporate distributions. Various countries have tried (and some still maintain) attempts at partial or full "integration" of the enterprise and owner taxation. Where a two level system is present but allows for fiscal transparency of some entities, definitional issues become very important.

== Source of income ==
Determining the source of income is of critical importance in a territorial system, as source often determines whether or not the income is taxed. For example, Hong Kong does not tax residents on dividend income received from a non-Hong Kong corporation. Source of income is also important in residency systems that grant credits for taxes of other jurisdictions. Such credit is often limited either by jurisdiction or to the local tax on overall income from other jurisdictions.

Source of income is where the income is considered to arise under the relevant tax system. The manner of determining the source of income is generally dependent on the nature of income. Income from the performance of services (e.g., wages) is generally treated as arising where the services are performed. Financing income (e.g., interest, dividends) is generally treated as arising where the user of the financing resides. Income related to use of tangible property (e.g., rents) is generally treated as arising where the property is situated. Income related to use of intangible property (e.g., royalties) is generally treated as arising where the property is used. Gains on sale of realty are generally treated as arising where the property is situated.

Gains from sale of tangible personal property are sourced differently in different jurisdictions. The U.S. treats such gains in three distinct manners: a) gain from sale of purchased inventory is sourced based on where title to the goods passes; b) gain from sale of inventory produced by the person (or certain related persons) is sourced 50% based on title passage and 50% based on location of production and certain assets; c) other gains are sourced based on the residence of the seller.

In specific cases, the tax system may diverge for different categories of individuals. U.S. citizen and resident alien decedents are subject to estate tax on all of their assets, wherever situated. The nonresident aliens are subject to estate tax only on that part of the gross estate which at the time of death is situated in the U.S. Another significant distinction between U.S. citizens/RAs and NRAs is in the exemptions allowed in computing the tax liability.

Where differing characterizations of an item of income can result in differing tax results, it is necessary to determine the characterization. Some systems have rules for resolving characterization issues, but in many cases resolution requires judicial intervention. Note that some systems which allow a credit for foreign taxes source income by reference to foreign law.

=== Definitions of income ===
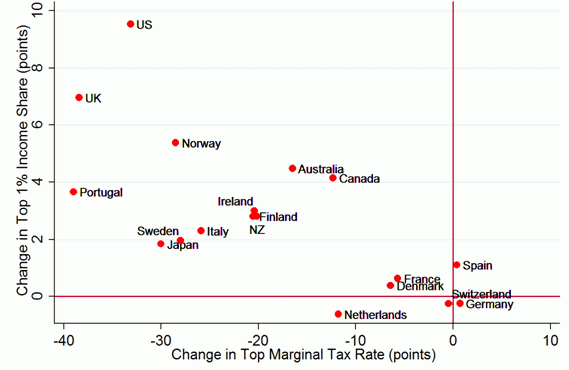
Change in top 1% pre-tax income shares against the change in their top marginal income tax rates from 1975 to 2008 for 18 OECD countries

Some jurisdictions tax net income as determined under financial accounting concepts of that jurisdiction, with few, if any, modifications. Other jurisdictions determine taxable income without regard to income reported in financial statements. Some jurisdictions compute taxable income by reference to financial statement income with specific categories of adjustments, which can be significant.

A jurisdiction relying on financial statement income tends to place reliance on the judgment of local accountants for determinations of income under locally accepted accounting principles. Often such jurisdictions have a requirement that financial statements be audited by registered accountants who must opine thereon. Some jurisdictions extend the audit requirements to include opining on such tax issues as transfer pricing. Jurisdictions not relying on financial statement income must attempt to define principles of income and expense recognition, asset cost recovery, matching, and other concepts within the tax law. These definitional issues can become very complex. Some jurisdictions following this approach also require business taxpayers to provide a reconciliation of financial statement and taxable incomes.

=== Deductions ===
Systems that allow a tax deduction of expenses in computing taxable income must provide for rules for allocating such expenses between classes of income. Such classes may be taxable versus non-taxable, or may relate to computations of credits for taxes of other systems (foreign taxes). A system which does not provide such rules is subject to manipulation by potential taxpayers. The manner of allocation of expenses varies. U.S. rules provide for allocation of an expense to a class of income if the expense directly relates to such class, and apportionment of an expense related to multiple classes. Specific rules are provided for certain categories of more fungible expenses, such as interest. By their nature, rules for allocation and apportionment of expenses may become complex. They may incorporate cost accounting or branch accounting principles, or may define new principles.

=== Thin capitalization ===
Most jurisdictions provide that taxable income may be reduced by amounts expended as interest on loans. By contrast, most do not provide tax relief for distributions to owners. Thus, an enterprise is motivated to finance its subsidiary enterprises through loans rather than capital. Many jurisdictions have adopted "thin capitalization" rules to limit such charges. Various approaches include limiting deductibility of interest expense to a portion of cash flow, disallowing interest expense on debt in excess of a certain ratio, and other mechanisms.

=== Enterprise restructure ===
The organization or reorganization of portions of a multinational enterprise often gives rise to events that, absent rules to the contrary, may be taxable in a particular system. Most systems contain rules preventing recognition of income or loss from certain types of such events. In the simplest form, contribution of business assets to a subsidiary enterprise may, in certain circumstances, be treated as a nontaxable event. Rules on structuring and restructuring tend to be highly complex.

== Credits for taxes of other jurisdictions ==
Systems that tax income from outside the system's jurisdiction tend to provide for a unilateral credit or offset for taxes paid to other jurisdictions. Such other jurisdiction taxes are generally referred to within the system as "foreign" taxes. Tax treaties often require this credit. A credit for foreign taxes is subject to manipulation by planners if there are no limits, or weak limits, on such credit. Generally, the credit is at least limited to the tax within the system that the taxpayer would pay on income from outside the jurisdiction. The credit may be limited by category of income, by other jurisdiction or country, based on an effective tax rate, or otherwise. Where the foreign tax credit is limited, such limitation may involve computation of taxable income from other jurisdictions. Such computations tend to rely heavily on the source of income and allocation of expense rules of the system.

== Withholding tax ==
Many jurisdictions require persons paying amounts to nonresidents to collect tax due from a nonresident with respect to certain income by withholding such tax from such payments and remitting the tax to the government. Such levies are generally referred to as withholding taxes. These requirements are induced because of potential difficulties in collection of the tax from nonresidents. Withholding taxes are often imposed at rates differing from the prevailing income tax rates. Further, the rate of withholding may vary by type of income or type of recipient. Generally, withholding taxes are reduced or eliminated under income tax treaties (see below). Generally, withholding taxes are imposed on the gross amount of income, unreduced by expenses. Such taxation provides for great simplicity of administration but can also reduce the taxpayer's awareness of the amount of tax being collected.

== Treaties ==
OECD members Applicants

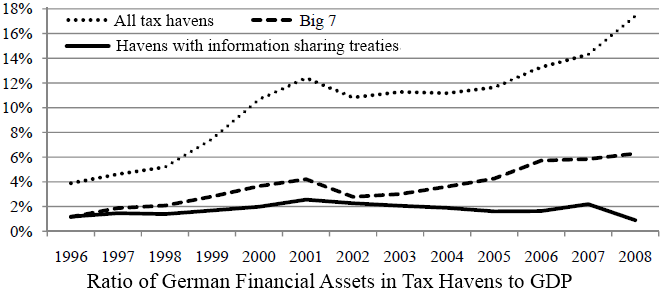
Ratio of German assets in tax havens to German GDP, 1996–2008. Havens in countries with tax information sharing allowing for compliance enforcement have been in decline. The "Big 7" shown are Hong Kong, Ireland, Lebanon, Liberia, Panama, Singapore, and Switzerland.

Tax treaties exist between many countries on a bilateral basis to prevent double taxation (taxes levied twice on the same income, profit, capital gain, inheritance or other item). In some countries they are also known as double taxation agreements, double tax treaties, or tax information exchange agreements (TIEA).

Most developed countries have a large number of tax treaties, while developing countries are less well represented in the worldwide tax treaty network. The United Kingdom has treaties with more than 110 countries and territories. The United States has treaties with 56 countries (as of February 2007). Tax treaties tend not to exist, or to be of limited application, when either party regards the other as a tax haven. There are a number of model tax treaties published by various national and international bodies, such as the United Nations and the OECD.

Treaties tend to provide reduced rates of taxation on dividends, interest, and royalties. They tend to impose limits on each treaty country in taxing business profits, permitting taxation only in the presence of a permanent establishment in the country. Treaties tend to impose limits on taxation of salaries and other income for performance of services. They also tend to have "tie breaker" clauses for resolving conflicts between residency rules. Nearly all treaties have at least skeletal mechanisms for resolving disputes, generally negotiated between the "competent authority" section of each country's taxing authority.

== Anti-deferral measures ==
Residency systems may provide that residents are not subject to tax on income outside the jurisdiction until that income is remitted to the jurisdiction. Examples include Mauritius and Thailand. Taxpayers in such remittance-based systems have significant incentives to shift income outside its borders. Depending on the rules of the system, the shifting may occur by changing the location of activities generating income or by shifting income to separate enterprises owned by the taxpayer. Most residency systems have avoided rules which permit deferring income from outside its borders without shifting it to a subsidiary enterprise due to the potential for manipulation of such rules. Where owners of an enterprise are taxed separately from the enterprise, portable income may be shifted from a taxpayer to a subsidiary enterprise to accomplish deferral or elimination of tax. Such systems tend to have rules to limit such deferral through controlled foreign corporations. Several different approaches have been used by countries for their anti-deferral rules.

In the United States, rules provides that U.S. shareholders of a Controlled Foreign Corporation (CFC) must include their shares of income or investment of E&P by the CFC in U.S. property. U.S. shareholders are U.S. persons owning 10% or more (after the application of complex attribution of ownership rules) of a foreign corporation. Such persons may include individuals, corporations, partnerships, trusts, estates, and other juridical persons. A CFC is a foreign corporation more than 50% owned by U.S. shareholders. This income includes several categories of portable income, including most investment income, certain resale income, and certain services income. Certain exceptions apply, including the exclusion from Subpart F income of CFC income subject to an effective foreign tax rate of 90% or more of the top U.S. tax rate.

The United Kingdom provides that a UK company is taxed currently on the income of its controlled subsidiary companies managed and controlled outside the UK which are subject to "low" foreign taxes. Low tax is determined as actual tax of less than three-fourths of the corresponding UK tax that would be due on the income determined under UK principles. Complexities arise in computing the corresponding UK tax. Further, there are certain exceptions which may permit deferral, including a "white list" of permitted countries and a 90% earnings distribution policy of the controlled company. Further, anti-deferral does not apply where there is no tax avoidance motive.

Rules in Germany provide that a German individual or company shareholder of a foreign corporation may be subject to current German tax on certain passive income received by the foreign corporation. This provision applies if the foreign corporation is taxed at less than 25% of the passive income, as defined. Japan and some other countries have followed a "black list" approach, where income of subsidiaries in countries identified as tax havens is subject to current tax to the shareholder. Sweden has adopted a "white list" of countries in which subsidiaries may be organized so that the shareholder is not subject to current tax.

== Transfer pricing ==
The setting of the amount of related party charges is commonly referred to as transfer pricing. Many jurisdictions have become sensitive to the potential for shifting profits with transfer pricing, and have adopted rules regulating setting or testing of prices or allowance of deductions or inclusion of income for related party transactions. Many jurisdictions have adopted broadly similar transfer pricing rules. The OECD has adopted (subject to specific country reservations) fairly comprehensive guidelines. These guidelines have been adopted with little modification by many countries. Notably, the U.S. and Canada have adopted rules which depart in some material respects from OECD guidelines, generally by providing more detailed rules.

Arm's length principle: It is a key concept of most transfer pricing rules, that prices charged between related enterprises should be those which would be charged between unrelated parties dealing at arm's length. Most sets of rules prescribe methods for testing whether prices charged should be considered to meet this standard. Such rules generally involve comparison of related party transactions to similar transactions of unrelated parties (comparable prices or transactions). Various surrogates for such transactions may be allowed. Most guidelines allow the following methods for testing prices: Comparable uncontrolled transaction prices, resale prices based on comparable markups, cost plus a markup, and an enterprise profitability method.

== Tax avoidance and evasion ==
Tax avoidance schemes, which are the legal use of rules to reduce taxes, may take advantage of jurisdictions with low or no taxes, known as tax havens. For example, individuals may move their investments or their residence, and corporations may move their headquarters, to jurisdictions with more favorable tax environments. In jurisdictions where corporate movement has been restricted by legislation, it might be necessary to reincorporate into a low-tax company through reversing a merger with a foreign corporation ("inversion" similar to a reverse merger). In addition, transfer pricing may allow for "earnings stripping" as profits are attributed to subsidiaries in low-tax jurisdictions.

The Organisation for Economic Co-operation and Development (OECD) has proposed a two-pillar solution to address tax avoidance schemes used by multinational corporations. The first pillar is mostly focused on reallocating profits to where they have been generated, and would only apply to a few hundred of the world's largest companies. As a result, it is estimated that taxing rights on more than 125 billion euros would be reallocated to market jurisdictions. The second pillar is the global minimum tax, which would introduce a minimum tax rate of 15% on the global income of multinational corporations, including their subsidiaries. It would apply to all multinational corporations with consolidated annual revenue of at least 750 million euros and is expected to bring in around 150 billion euros in taxes. As of 2024, the OECD's two-pillar solution was accepted by 140 jurisdictions, but only 33 would be implementing it immediately. One of the biggest abstentions from implementation is the United States, which is opposed to some aspects of the global minimum tax and favors its proposal of the Global Intangible Low-Taxed Income (GILTI) tax. GILTI involves a minimum tax rate of around 10%, and is targeted more at intangible assets such as patents and intellectual property.

Tax evasion schemes, which are the illegal attempt to reduce taxes, usually through deliberate omission or incorrect reporting, may also take advantage of tax havens with little or no financial reporting. Such schemes became a major issue for governments worldwide during the Great Recession. Responses to this issue began when the United States introduced the Foreign Account Tax Compliance Act (FATCA) in 2010, and were greatly expanded by the OECD's Common Reporting Standard (CRS), a new international system for the automatic exchange of tax information, to which around 100 jurisdictions have committed. For some taxpayers, CRS is already "live"; for others it is imminent. The goal of this worldwide exchange of tax information is tax transparency, and has aroused concerns about privacy and data breaches due to the sheer volume of information to be exchanged.

Expanded Worldwide Planning is an element of international taxation created in the wake of tax directives from government tax authorities after the worldwide recession beginning in 2008. At its heart is a properly constructed Private placement life insurance policy that allows taxpayers to use the regulatory framework of life insurance to structure their assets. These assets can be located anywhere in the world and at the same time can be brought into compliance with tax authorities worldwide. Expanded Worldwide Planning also brings asset protection and privacy benefits that are set forward in the six principals of Expanded Worldwide Planning.

== See also ==
- Public finance
- List of countries by tax rates
- Tax equalization
- Functional currency
- Tariff
- Minimum corporate tax rate
