= Entity classification election =

Corporate taxation election

For United States income tax purposes, a business entity may elect to be treated either as a corporation or as other than a corporation. This entity classification election is made by filing Internal Revenue Service Form 8832. Absent filing the form, a default classification applies. U.S. corporations of the type that can be publicly traded must be treated as corporations. There is a list of specific foreign entities that must be treated as corporations. The election is effective for Federal income tax purposes.

If an entity is not classified as a corporation, it is treated as a partnership for U.S. tax purposes if it has more than one owner, or is treated as a "disregarded entity" if it has a single owner (i.e. is treated as part of the single owner).

The classification of either a U.S. or non-U.S. entity for U.S. tax purposes has no effect for purposes other than U.S. income tax.

== Eligibility to make an election ==
An entity, which is eligible to make an election, is referred to as an eligible entity. Generally, a corporation organized under U.S. federal or state statute (and referred to as a corporation, body corporate or body politic by that statute) is not an eligible entity. However, the following types of business entity are treated as eligible entities:

1. An eligible entity that previously elected to be an association taxable as a corporation by filing Form 8832. An entity that elects to be classified as a corporation by filing Form 8832 can make another election to change its classification, subject to the 60-month limitation rule.
2. A foreign eligible entity that became an association taxable as a corporation under the foreign default rule described below.
3. A foreign corporation that is not identified as a corporation under Treasury regulations §301.7701-2(b)(8). If a foreign corporation is not identified on the list included in these regulations, it qualifies as an eligible entity.

The list of foreign entities classified as corporations for federal tax purposes (so called per se corporations, not eligible to make an entity classification election) includes, as of September 2009:

- American Samoa, Corporation
- Argentina, Sociedad Anónima
- Australia, Public Limited Company
- Austria, Aktiengesellschaft
- Barbados, Limited Company
- Belgium, Naamloze Vennootschap/Société Anonyme/Aktiengesellschaft
- Belize, Public Limited Company
- Bolivia, Sociedad Anónima
- Brazil, Sociedade Anónima
- Bulgaria, Aktsionerno Druzhestvo.
- Canada, Corporation and Company
- Chile, Sociedad Anónima
- People's Republic of China, Gufen Youxian Gongsi
- Republic of China (Taiwan), Ku-fen Yu-hsien Kung-szu
- Colombia, Sociedad Anónima
- Costa Rica, Sociedad Anónima
- Cyprus, Public Limited Company
- Czech Republic, akciová společnost (or a.s. or akc. spol.)
- Denmark, Aktieselskab
- Ecuador, Sociedad Anónima or Compañía Anónima
- Egypt, Sharikat Al-Mossahamah
- El Salvador, Sociedad Anónima
- Estonia, Aktsiaselts
- European Economic Area/European Union, Societas Europaea
- Finland, Julkinen Osakeyhtio/Publikt Aktiebolag
- France, Société anonyme
- Germany, Aktiengesellschaft
- Greece, Anonymos Etairia
- Guam, Corporation
- Guatemala, Sociedad Anónima
- Guyana, Public Limited Company
- Honduras, Sociedad Anónima
- Hong Kong, Public Limited Company
- Hungary, Reszvenytarsasag
- Iceland, Hlutafelag
- India, Public Limited Company
- Indonesia, Perseroan Terbuka
- Ireland, Public Limited Company
- Israel, Public Limited Company
- Italy, Società per Azioni
- Jamaica, Public Limited Company
- Japan, Kabushiki Kaisha (kabushiki gaisha)
- Kazakhstan, Ashyk Aktsionerlik Kogham
- Republic of Korea, Chusik Hoesa
- Latvia, Akciju sabiedrība
- Liberia, Corporation
- Liechtenstein, Aktiengesellschaft
- Lithuania, Akcine Bendrove
- Luxembourg, Société anonyme
- Malaysia, Berhad
- Malta, Public Limited Company
- Mexico, Sociedad Anónima
- Morocco, Société anonyme
- Netherlands, Naamloze Vennootschap
- New Zealand, Limited Company
- Nicaragua, Compañía Anónima
- Nigeria, Public Limited Company
- Northern Mariana Islands, Corporation
- Norway, Allment Aksjeselskap
- Pakistan, Public Limited Company
- Panama, Sociedad Anónima
- Paraguay, Sociedad Anónima
- Peru, Sociedad Anónima
- Philippines, Stock Corporation
- Poland, Spolka Akcyjna
- Portugal, Sociedade Anónima
- Puerto Rico, Corporation
- Romania, Societate pe Actiuni
- Russia, Otkrytoye Aktsionernoy Obshchestvo (Открытое акционерное общество)
- Saudi Arabia, Sharikat Al-Mossahamah
- Singapore, Public Limited Company
- Slovak Republic, Akciova Spolocnost
- Slovenia, Delniska Druzba
- South Africa, Public Limited Company
- Spain, Sociedad Anónima
- Surinam, Naamloze Vennootschap
- Sweden, Publika Aktiebolag
- Switzerland, Aktiengesellschaft
- Thailand, Borisat Chamkad (Mahachon)
- Trinidad and Tobago, Limited Company
- Tunisia, Société anonyme
- Turkey, Anonym Şirket
- Ukraine, Aktsionerne Tovaristvo Vidkritogo Tipu
- United Kingdom, Public Limited Company
- United States Virgin Islands, Corporation
- Uruguay, Sociedad Anónima
- Venezuela, Sociedad Anónima or Compañía Anónima

In 2013, the IRS added a Croatian dioničko društvo to the list of per se corporations.

== Default classification ==
An eligible entity is classified for federal tax purposes under the default rules described below unless it files Form 8832 or Form 2553, Election by a Small Business Corporation, to elect a classification or change its current classification. The IRS uses the information entered on the form to establish the entity's filing and reporting requirements for federal tax purposes. Certain domestic and foreign entities that were in existence before January 1, 1997, and have an established federal tax classification generally do not need to make an election to continue that classification. If an existing entity decides to change its classification, it may do so subject to the 60-month limitation rule.

Unless an election is made on Form 8832, a domestic eligible entity will be classified by default as:

1. A partnership if it has two or more members.
2. Disregarded as an entity separate from its owner if it has a single owner. A change in the number of members of an eligible entity classified as an association (defined below) does not affect the entity's classification. However, an eligible entity classified as a partnership will become a disregarded entity when the entity's membership is reduced to one member and a disregarded entity will be classified as a partnership when the entity has more than one member.

Unless an election is made on Form 8832, a foreign eligible entity will be classified by default as:

1. A partnership if it has two or more members and at least one member does not have limited liability.
2. An association taxable as a corporation if all members have limited liability.
3. Disregarded as an entity separate from its owner if it has a single owner that does not have limited liability.

The effect of these rules is that a U.S. limited liability company (LLC) or limited liability partnership (LLP) is treated by default as a partnership (or disregarded entity if it has only one owner), whereas a foreign LLP is treated by default as a corporation (if, as is generally the case, all its members have limited liability).

If an entity has been operating under one classification for some time, but then elects to change its classification, there may be tax consequences. The initial regulations were unclear on this point, so the IRS issued Revenue Rulings 99-5 and 99–6 in 1999 to address questions surrounding the conversion of an LLC to a partnership and vice versa.

== Use in international tax planning ==
The "check-the-box" regulations paved the way for various new tax avoidance and tax deferral strategies. Specifically, they expanded the opportunity for "hybrid branch" or "hybrid entity" strategies, which take advantage of differences in the classification of an entity as a corporation or not in multiple jurisdictions, in order to engage in cross-border tax arbitrage. The possibility that the check-the-box rules would greatly expand the potential for such strategies had been pointed out prior to implementation, and at one point some commentators suggested disallowing foreign entities from electing their classification at all; however, in the end, the IRS, while acknowledging such concerns, issued regulations which gave foreign and domestic entities largely similar powers to elect their own classification.

US owners of foreign subsidiaries benefit from the ability to have those foreign subsidiaries treated as disregarded entities. Under the United States' Internal Revenue Code Subpart F, payments between related Controlled Foreign Corporations (CFCs), or from American companies to related CFCs, may be "treated as Subpart F income" (subject to current taxation as if they were profits in the hands of the ultimate American owner of the corporate structure), in an effort to limit the ability of American citizens and corporations to defer US tax on the income of foreign corporations they control. However, payments between an American-owned foreign entity which is taxed as a corporation, and a foreign subsidiary of that entity which itself has elected to be treated as a disregarded entity, are not treated as Subpart F income. This arrangement may be used to shift income between the two non-American jurisdictions and avoid local taxes in one or the other, e.g. through thin capitalization. Another category of US taxpayers who benefit from check-the-box regulations consists of US flow-through entities (S corporations and partnerships) with foreign subsidiaries. If the foreign subsidiary is treated as a corporation, the taxes it pays to the foreign government do not create a foreign tax credit for the US owner under Section 902. However, with a check-the-box election to be treated as a disregarded entity, the foreign taxes are treated as having been directly imposed on the US owner, thus giving rise to the tax credit.

For US owners with foreign subsidiaries, choosing to have a subsidiary treated as a disregarded entity is not always the most beneficial tax-planning choice, however. For example, if a US taxpayer owns a disregarded foreign entity, its income will be taxed at the owner's ordinary US income tax rates, less the foreign tax already paid. This may result in every marginal dollar being taxed at the highest rate. However, if the foreign entity had elected to be taxed as a corporation (or been classified as such by default), paid a low rate tax in the foreign country, then repatriated its income to the US by paying qualified dividends to its owner, the total proportion of tax paid on income might actually be less, as qualified dividends are only taxed at 15%. However, this treatment is only available for dividends from corporations in certain countries, and is set to sunset in 2010 under the Tax Increase Prevention and Reconciliation Act of 2005.

Foreign owners of US corporations also benefit from the ability to have entities normally treated as flow-through instead be taxed as corporations by the IRS. In what is sometimes known as a "domestic reverse hybrid" strategy, a non-US corporation may set up a US holding company which elects to be treated as a corporation for US tax purposes, but which its home country tax law sees as a flow-through entity. The US holding company receives a loan from its home country parent which it invests in a US operating subsidiary; the US holding company receives dividends from the US operation subsidiary and pays interest to the non-US parent. US tax law thus sees a US company making a dividend payment to another US company (which is thus not subject to withholding tax, unlike a dividend paid to a foreign company) which then pays interest to a foreign company, while the home country tax law will see a US company paying dividends directly to its home country parent. Under typical treaties for the relief of double taxation, neither government has the right to tax the payment, because each sees it as a type of payment which only the other has the right to tax.

== History ==
Prior to 1996, whether domestic and foreign entities were classified as corporations was based on a six-factor test which looked at:

1. limited liability;
2. continuity of life;
3. free transferability of interests;
4. centralized management;
5. associates;
6. objective to carry on business for joint profit

An entity which had a preponderance of the first four factors (the last two, in practice, were shared by all business entities) was treated as a corporation, otherwise as a partnership or an association. In practice, however, this test was easily manipulated.

The "check-the-box" regulations (Treasury Decision 8697) were adopted in 1996 in order to simplify the issue of entity classification. A grandfather clause allowed entities in existence on May 8, 1996 to continue using their previous classification, even if they would no longer be eligible to elect that classification under the new rules. There were three conditions for this grandfathering:

1. the entity had a reasonable basis (within the meaning of section 6662) for its claimed classification;
2. the entity and all owners recognized the federal tax consequences of any change in classification within 60 months prior to January 1, 1997; and
3. neither the entity nor its owners had been advised that the entity was under examination on or before May 8, 1996.

The initial regulations also included a list of foreign entities which would always be classified as corporations ("per-se corporations") and which could not elect to be disregarded. The proposed regulations included naamloze vennootschap formed under the laws of Aruba or the Netherlands Antilles in that list, but they were removed from the final list; conversely, Canadian corporations were added to the list.

In 1998, the IRS issued Notice 98–11, 1998-1 C.B. 433 in an attempt to combat the use of "check-the-box" in international tax planning (see below); however, the notice met opposition, and was withdrawn by Notice 98–35, 1998-2 C.B. 34. Another proposal, around 1999, would have left the basic check-the-box regime in place, but allowed the IRS to disregard entity classification elections made in connection with "extraordinary transactions" (where the tax liability changes "significantly" as a result of the election). An "extraordinary transaction" was defined as one in which there was a sale, exchange, transfer, or other disposition of a 10-percent or greater interest in a foreign entity; the proposed regulations provided that an election to be classified as a disregarded entity could be ignored, and thus the entity continue to be taxed as a corporation, if the election occurred within twelve months following the day before an extraordinary transaction. However, various tax professionals opposed the changes, arguing that the threshold for defining an extraordinary transaction was far too low, and that existing internal revenue regulations, as well as common law doctrines such as the principle of substance over form and the step transaction doctrine, were already sufficient to combat any abuses of the check-the-box rules.

President Barack Obama attempted to revive the IRS' 1998 notice in his proposed 2010 budget. Specifically, the proposal stated:

Reform business entity classification rules for foreign entities: Under the proposal, a foreign eligible entity may be treated as a disregarded entity only if the single owner of the foreign eligible entity is created or organized in, or under the law of, the foreign country in, or under the law of, which the foreign eligible entity is created or organized. Therefore, a foreign eligible entity with a single owner that is organized or created in a country other than that of its single owner would be treated as a corporation for federal tax purposes. Except in cases of U.S. tax avoidance, the proposal would generally not apply to a first-tier foreign eligible entity wholly owned by a United States person. The tax treatment of the conversion to a corporation of a foreign eligible entity treated as a disregarded entity would be consistent with current Treasury regulations and relevant tax principles.

The proposal was eventually dropped again due to criticism from businesses, and it was not included again in the 2011 budget proposal either.
