= PFIC =

PFIC may refer to:

- Passive foreign investment company, a classification of a foreign enterprise under US tax code
- Pontifical Faculty of the Immaculate Conception
- Progressive familial intrahepatic cholestasis, a disease
