= Passive foreign investment company =

Provisions of United States tax law

For purposes of income tax in the United States, U.S. persons owning shares of a passive foreign investment company (PFIC) may choose between (i) current taxation on the income of the PFIC or (ii) deferral of such income subject to a deemed tax and interest regime. The provision was enacted as part of the Tax Reform Act of 1986 as a way of placing owners of offshore investment funds on a similar footing to owners of U.S. investment funds (regulated investment companies). The original provisions applied for all foreign corporations meeting either an income or an asset test. However, 1997 amendments limited the application in the case of U.S. Shareholders of controlled foreign corporations.

== Definition ==
Any foreign (i.e., non-U.S.) corporation meeting either the income test or the asset test is a PFIC with respect to each shareholder when the test is met. PFIC status applies separately for each U.S. person owning shares, and also separately with respect to shares acquired at different times. PFIC status does not, itself, have any impact on the foreign corporation or foreign shareholders.

The income test is met if 75% or more of the foreign corporation's gross income is passive income, defined as foreign personal holding company income with modifications.

The asset test is met if 50% or more of the foreign corporation's average assets (as defined in the IR Code) produce, or could produce passive income, or are assets (such as cash and bare land) that produce no income. The test is applied based on the foreign corporation's adjusted basis, for U.S. tax purposes, of the assets, or at the election of the particular shareholder, fair market values of the assets.

Look-thru of 25% subsidiaries: Interests in 25% or more owned foreign corporations are treated similarly to partnership interests (i.e., looked through) for the income test and the asset test.

( 2 tests - income test 75%; asset test - 50%)

== Effect of PFIC status ==
If a U.S. person receives income from a PFIC or recognizes gain from disposition of shares of a 1291 fund, such person is subject to a tax and interest regime. A shareholder may elect out of this regime (see QEF below). The regime applies only to any distribution or gain in excess of 125% of the average distributions for the prior three years. This regime is as follows: First, such income or gain (in excess of the 125%) is allocated pro rata to each year of the person's holding period for the particular shares. Next, the amounts allocated to prior years after 1986 are excluded from current year taxable income. Then tax is computed on amounts allocated to each prior year at the maximum rate of tax applicable to the type of taxpayer for such year (prior year tax). Then interest is computed on such prior year tax as if it were an underpayment of tax (interest charge). Finally, current year tax is increased by the aggregate of prior year tax amounts and interest charge amounts.

The interest charges are computed using compound interest on an April 15 to April 15 basis. Given a sufficiently long holding period, the tax and back-interest will exceed 100%. However, the shareholder may avoid >100% tax by periodically selling and repurchasing his holdings, using the after-tax proceeds to repurchase shares.

Shareholders of a PFIC (including a QEF) are eligible for foreign tax credit with respect to the current and deemed prior year taxes, including the deemed paid credit for 10% corporate shareholders of the PFIC.

== Qualified Electing Fund (QEF) election ==
Each U.S. person owning shares of a PFIC may elect to include their share of the ordinary income and net capital gains of the PFIC(similar to shareholders of a mutual fund), provided that the PFIC issues the necessary PFIC annual information statement. The PFIC annual information statement is a rough equivalent of Form 1099. This election is effective for the year in which the election is made and all subsequent years. The tax and interest regime is avoided to the extent this election applies.

This election helps U.S. persons holding shares of a PFIC by treating the income earned through the PFIC similar to other US entities. For example, shareholders of corporations are usually subject to U.S. tax only when the income is distributed. In addition, shareholders of a U.S. mutual fund are subject to tax on their pro rata share of ordinary income and capital gains of the mutual fund.

QEF status applies only to the shares of a particular shareholder acquired during a tax year for which the QEF election was in force, assuming that the QEF election remains in place throughout the holding period. Such status does not apply to other shareholders or to persons acquiring the particular shares.

QEF status fully avoids the tax and interest regime only if it is effective from the beginning of the share's holding period. If a shareholder elects QEF status for particular shares at a date later than the acquisition date, one of three additional elections may be made to "purge" PFIC status for prior years. The shareholder may make one of two gain recognition elections (deemed sale and mark to market) or, if the shareholder is a corporation, a deemed dividend election. In each case, the gain or deemed dividend recognized under the election is subject to the tax and interest regime.

== Mark to market ==
A shareholder of a PFIC may also elect each year to recognize gain or loss on the shares as if he, she or it had sold the PFIC shares at fair market value, although gains are taxed as ordinary income. Losses generate ordinary income deductions to the extent they reverse prior gains, on a share-by-share basis, after which they are claimed on US schedule D. Such election is available only for shares the market value of which is readily determinable (e.g., regularly traded shares). Shares subject to this election are not subject to the tax and interest regime. Also, this election is independent of prior PFIC elections (i.e. QEF or Sect 1291 election). for example: If stock X was purchased in 2007 for $100, has a FMV on December 31, 2011, of $120, and no PFIC forms were filed until 2011 (when Sect 1296- Mark-to-market- election was made), no PFIC filings would be needed for the prior years as long as distributions were less than 125% and no capital gains occurred. For the current year, 8621 would be filed using Mark to market and the ordinary income would be $20.

== Coordination with CFC rules ==
U.S. Shareholders (generally 10% or more owners) of a controlled foreign corporation (CFC) are not subject to the tax and interest regime with respect to any share which was not a share of a PFIC at any time before 1997. Such shareholders are, instead, subject to the CFC rules.

== Reporting and making elections ==
Each U.S. person owning shares of a PFIC is required to file IRS Form 8621. Such form is used to report actual distributions and gain, as well as income and gains under a QEF election. Such form is also used to make the QEF and purging elections described above. Failure to file such form in a year in which no income is properly reported does not carry specific penalties, but may render the return incomplete and potentially subject to tolling of the statute of limitations.
