= United Nations Security Council Resolution 2023 =

UN Security Council Resolution 2023
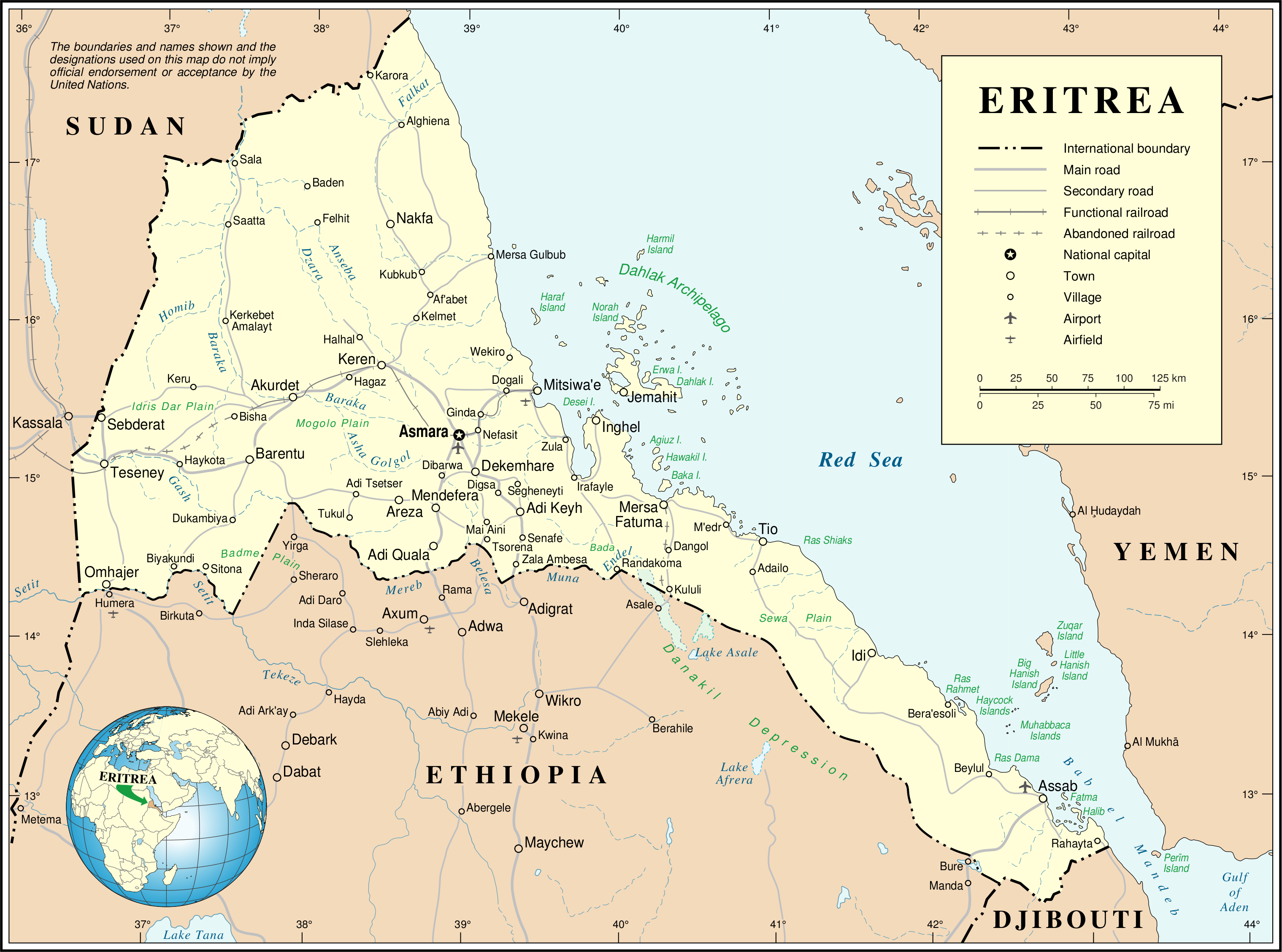
- Map of Eritrea
- Date: 5 December 2011
- Meeting no.: 6,674
- Code: S/RES/2023 (Document)
- Subject: Peace and security in Africa
- Voting summary: 13 voted for; None voted against; 2 abstained
- Result: Adopted

Security Council composition
- Permanent members: China; France; Russia; United Kingdom; United States
- Non-permanent members: Bosnia–Herzegovina; Brazil; Colombia; Germany; Gabon; India; Lebanon; Nigeria; Portugal; South Africa

United Nations Security Council Resolution 2023 was unanimously adopted on 5 December 2011.

== Resolution ==
Concerned at the potential use of the Eritrean mining sector as a financial source to destabilize the Horn of Africa region, the Security Council reinforced the sanctions regime on that country to prevent mining funds from contributing to its continued violations of those measures.

Adopting resolution 2023 (2011), under Chapter VII of the Charter, by a vote of 13 in favour to none against, with 2 abstentions (China, Russian Federation), the Council demanded that Eritrea cease all direct or indirect efforts to destabilize States, and decided that States shall "undertake appropriate measures to promote the exercise of vigilance" in business dealings with Eritrea's mining sector. To that end, it requested its Sanctions Committee concerning Somalia and Eritrea to draft, with the assistance of the Somalia/Eritrea Monitoring Group, due diligence guidelines for States' optional use.

The Council also condemned Eritrea's use of the "diaspora tax" on the Eritrean diaspora to destabilize the Horn of Africa region and to violate the sanctions regime, including by procuring arms and related materiel for transfer to armed opposition groups, and decided that Eritrea shall cease those practices. It further decided that Eritrea shall stop using extortion, threats of violence, fraud and other illicit means to collect taxes outside of Eritrea from its nationals or other individuals of Eritrean descent.

== Voting ==
Approved (13)	Abstained (2)	Opposed (0)
Bosnia and Herzegovina; Brazil; Colombia; Germany; **France**; Gabon; India; Lebanon; Nigeria; Portugal; South Africa; **United Kingdom**; **United States**	**China**; **Russia**	

* Permanent members of the Security Council are in bold.

== See also ==
- List of United Nations Security Council Resolutions 2001 to 2100
