= Taxation in Gibraltar =

Taxation in Gibraltar is determined by the law of Gibraltar which is based on English law, but is separate from the UK legal system. Companies and non-residents do not pay income tax unless the source of this income is or is deemed to be Gibraltar. Individuals pay tax on a worldwide basis on income from employment or self employment if they are ordinarily resident in Gibraltar. There is no tax on capital income.

In Gibraltar there is no capital gains tax, wealth tax, sales tax or value added tax. Import duty is payable on all items at 10%. The main tax for companies is Corporation Tax, and Social insurance contributions. There are also stamp duties on certain transactions, and property taxes ('rates'). Gibraltar benefits from an extensive shipping trade, offshore banking, and its position as an international conference center. It is a well known and regulated international finance centre and has been a popular jurisdiction for European offshore companies. The financial sector, tourism, shipping services fees, and duties on consumer goods generate revenue. Non-resident companies can take advantage of a number of offshore regimes to reduce taxation, although in line with the elimination of unfair tax practices this is being phased out. Individuals pay quite high taxes on their income in Gibraltar unless they are able to take advantage of high-net-worth individual status or gain exemption as an expatriate executive. Import duties are quite high on some items.

Assessment and collection of tax is administered by the Commissioner of Income Tax; the tax year runs from 1 July to the following 30 June.

The information in this article is taken from the publication "Gibraltar Tax facts". It may be incorrect or out of date. For the latest data see the Government of Gibraltar website listed in external links.

== Value added tax ==
Gibraltar is a VAT free jurisdiction.

On 15 July 2026, Gibraltar introduced a new Transaction Tax (TT) on goods as part of the post-Brexit UK–EU treaty and customs union arrangements. This tax replaced the previous import duty regime for goods imported or manufactured for sale in Gibraltar. It is not a Value-Added Tax (VAT), and services are exempt. It reduces the price gap across the border and it is designed to secure an open border with Spain.

The standard rate is phased:

- Year 1: 15%
- Year 2: 16%
- Year 3 onward: aligned to the lowest EU standard VAT rate (17%)

There are also reduced (5%) and zero (0%) rates for certain categories.

== Gaming tax (Online gaming) ==
Levied at the rate of 1% of relevant income (gaming yield for online casinos and bets placed for online bookmakers), capped at £425,000 with a minimum payable of £85,000.

== Import duties ==
Import duties are levied on goods imported into Gibraltar, mostly at rates of 0% – 12%. As of 1 July 2010, import duty on pedal cycles, electric cars, solar panelling and related equipment has been reduced to 0%. Import duty on hybrid cars has similarly been reduced, though it has increased for petrol and diesel powered vehicles.

=== Excise duties ===
Levied mainly on spirits, wines, tobacco and mineral oils.

=== Social insurance, 2009 ===
Class	Rate	Minimum	Maximum
Employee (under 60)	10% earnings	£5.00	£25.16
Employee (Aged 60 & Over)	0% earnings	£0.00	£0.00
Employer	20% earnings	£15.00	£32.97
Self Employed	20% earnings	£10.00	£30.17

Minimums and maxima shown are per week. No contributions are payable if the person is not in receipt of earnings. Income earned by a student on holiday is exempt.

== Corporation tax ==
Before 2009, the rate of corporation tax was 22%. With effect from 1 July 2009, regarding any new businesses, a start up rate of 10% will apply to any business established in Gibraltar after 1 July 2009. Tax will be assessed on an actual year basis. With effect from 1 January 2011, a new rate of 10% will apply to all companies except energy and utility providers, which will pay a 10% surcharge and thus incur a rate of 20%. These will include electricity, fuel, telephone service and water providers.

As an anti-avoidance provision, it will not apply in respect of any commercial activity being carried out before 25 June 2009 and that is reorganised by the taxpayer in the name of a different entity for the purpose of benefiting from the scheme.

=== Withholding tax ===
Class	Rate
dividends	0%
In interest paid to resident individuals	0%
On interest paid to resident companies	22%
On interest paid to non-residents	0%

In addition, no tax is payable on dividends between Gibraltar companies

=== Capital taxation ===
- Estate Duty – There is no Estate duty in Gibraltar
- Capital Gains Tax – There is no Capital Gains Tax in Gibraltar.
- Other Capital Taxes – There are no wealth, gift or other capital taxes

== Income tax rates ==
Gibraltar has two tax systems, one based on gross income which does not provide any allowances, and another with different rates which does. The choice of which system to apply is made by the taxable person.

=== Gross Income Based System ===
1. Persons on gross income up to £16,000

Income	Rate	Payable
0 – £10,000	8%	£800
£10,001 – £16,000	20%	£1200

2. Persons on gross income £16,000 to £25,000

Income	On first	Rate	Balance at 20%	Payable
£16,001 – £17,000	£6000	0%	£10,001 – £11,000	£2,000 – £2,200
£17,001 – £18,000	£5,000	0%	£12,001 – £13,000	£2,400 – £2,600
£18,001 – £19,000	£4000	0%	£14,001 – £15,000	£2,800 – £3,000
£19,001 – £20,000	£3000	0%	£16,001 – £17,000	£3,200 – £3,400
£20,001 – £25,000	£2000	0%	£18,001 – £23,000	£3,600 – £4,600

3. Persons on gross income between £25,001 and £35,000

A rate of 20% applies less tapering relief on gross income between £25,001 and £26,000. With the tapering relief on gross income of £25,000, there is a tax-free amount of £2000 that reduces by £2 for every £1 increase in gross income.

4. Persons on gross income between £35,001 and £100,000

The effective (average) tax rate is reduced by 0.5% from the previous year using a complex formula to give a maximum effective tax rate of 26.25% on gross income of £100,000. The tax liability is arrived at by first calculating using the previous year's tax band (i.e. 20% for tax bands of £0 – £25,000 and 29% for £25,001 – £100,000), then reducing it by 0.5% and finally applying the resulting rate of taxable income (gross income less tapering relief). With the tapering relief on gross income of £35,001, there is a tax-free amount of £3284 that reduces by £2 for every £1 increase in gross income.

5. Persons on gross income between £100,001 and £353,000

A rate of 20% on the first £25,000 of gross income applies, with the balance taxed at 29%. With the tapering relief on gross income of £100,001, there is a tax-free amount of £1722 that reduces by £2 for every £1 increase in gross income.

6. Individuals on Gross Income over £353,000

Taxed As Follows	Tax Rate
First £25,001	20%
£25,001 – £353,000	29%
£353,001 – £704,800	20%
£704,801 – £1,000,000	10%
Excess over £1,000,000	5%

=== Allowance Based Scheme ===
Bands	Tax Rate	Tax on band
0 – 4,000	17% (reduced rate)	£680
4,001 – 16,000	30% (standard rate)	£3,600
Over – 16,000	40%	

A wide range of allowances apply for children, single parents, mortgage relief etc. (Below)

Main Income Tax Allowances & Reliefs
Personal Allowance	£2812
Spouse Allowance	£2632
Nursery School Allowance (per child)	£1023
Child Relief in respect of first child only	£997
Child Relief in respect of each child educated abroad	£1105
Disabled Person	£2724
Dependent Relatives (maximum for Resident)	£190
Dependent Relatives (maximum for Non-resident)	£139
Blind person	£627
Apprentice	£380
Single parent	£2632
Home Purchase Allowance (deduction)	£11,500
Home Purchase (Special – £1000 maximum p.a.)	£4000
Social Insurance (Employee)	£335
Social Insurance (Self-employed)	£432

== Stamp duty ==
Stamp Duty is only payable on real estate and capital transactions at the following rates:

- £10 for Share Capital
- £10 for Loan Capital

On purchase of Real Estate:

- Nil for real estate costing up to £200,000
- 2% on the first £250,000 and 5.5% on the balance for real estate costing between £200,001 and £350,000
- 3% on first £350,000 and 3.5% on the balance for real estate costing over £350,000

== Other allowances & reliefs ==
- Low Income Earners Allowance – Individuals earning less than £8000 per tax year will not be subject to any taxation. An additional tax allowance is also given to taxpayers whose earned annual income is less than £19,500.
- Students – Earnings during school or university vacations are exempt from tax.
- Mortgage Interest Relief – This is interest fully allowable on loans to finance residential property in Gibraltar occupied by the taxpayer. The allowance is restricted on loans issued on or after 1 July 2008 to a maximum of £300,000. Conversely, loans of over £300,000 issued before this date will be grandfathered with the amount over the limit that is allowable being reduced by 1/10 per annum.
- Life Assurance Premiums – These are premiums fully allowable provided they do not exceed 1/7 of assessable income or 7% of the capital sum assured at death. In respect of policies issued on or after 3 June 2008, the allowance is limited to a basic tax rate of 17%.
- Working Pensioners’ Relief – Anyone that is over the age of 60 that is not in receipt of an occupational pension scheme and continues to work is entitled to a tax credit of £4000.
- Medical Insurance Allowance – The first £1120 of eligible premiums paid in the tax year by an individual for personal health insurance cover or for the benefit of that individual's spouse or dependent children is fully allowable.
- ‘Topping-up’ Allowances – Individuals whose total allowances are less than £3700 will have their allowances ‘topped up’ to this amount. In the case of elderly people (men aged over 65 and over; women aged 60 and over), the allowances are topped-up to £10,887.
- Pension Contributions and withdrawal of capital (tax-free) – Contributions to approved personal or occupational pension schemes are allowable subject to certain limits. There is no requirement to buy an annuity. Additionally, pensioners may withdraw the whole of the capital tax-free. With effect from 25 June 2009, the possibility to ‘carry back’ excess contributions to earlier tax years was abolished. Furthermore, with effect from 1 July 2009, tax relief on contributions to retirement annuity contracts and personal pension schemes is limited to the lower of 20% of earned income or £35,000.
- Income from occupational pensions – Income from occupational pensions is generally taxed at 0% for those aged 60 and over.
- Savings Income – Income from qualified investments, such as interest from bank and building society deposits and income from quoted investments, is tax-free.
- Gibraltar Government Debentures – Investments in various Government debentures are exempt from Income Tax

== Agreement with Spain ==
In 2019, the International Agreement on Taxation and Protection of Financial Interests between Spain and the United Kingdom on Gibraltar was signed by all three countries. This agreement covers such issues as tax co-operation between the authorities in Gibraltar and Spain, the criteria for tax residence of individuals and companies and procedures for administrative cooperation.
