= Life insurance tax shelter =

Use of life insurance to defer or reduce taxes

A life insurance tax shelter uses investments in insurance to protect income or assets from tax liabilities. In Dow Chemical Company, v. United States, the Sixth Circuit Court of Appeals held that the use by an employer for such a tax shelter is illegal and a sham, used as tax evasion by the Dow Chemical Company.

The Court decided:

Because the COLI plans were economic shams and the deductions therefore were properly disallowed, we REVERSE the district court's judgment and remand for entry of judgment in favor of the United States.

— Dow Chemical Company, v. United States, 435 F.3d 594 (6th Cir. 2006).

The United States Congress took note of the decision in 2008 for the purposes of budgetary considerations, since the consequences of the decision would increase tax revenues.
