= Private placement life insurance =

Form of cash value universal life insurance

Private placement life insurance is a form of cash value universal life insurance that is offered privately, rather than through a public offering. It is typically only available to wealthy clients. A 2024 US Senate report alleged that the insurance mechanism in practice functions as a tool for tax avoidance, specifically for inheritance taxes, and was at the time being used to shelter up to $40 billion.

== Overview ==
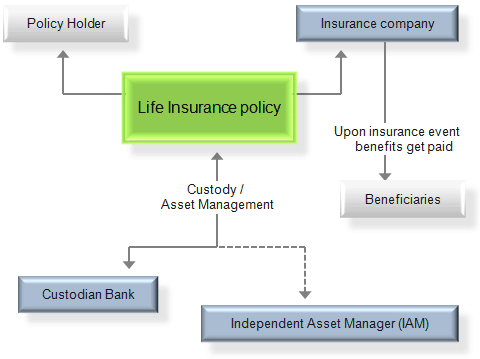
Chart of a life insurance

Variable or indexed life insurance is a form of life insurance that has cash value linked to the performance of one or more investment accounts within the policy. Because of its investment features, insurance carriers in the United States typically register offerings of variable life insurance with federal and state securities regulators. To register the offering, carriers typically need to provide some level of detail of the investment selections within the policy. Without knowing the specifics of each potential client's investment profile, carriers often settle for registering a uniform offering that includes a selection of mutual funds as investment options within the policy. Not all investments are suitable for placement within these policies. They are better suited to absolute return and hedged strategies rather than equity based investments. Because of the volatility of the stock market the drawdowns within the investment portfolio tend to be larger and the owner may end up having to put more money into the policy to keep it in force if the account value drops considerably.

This can become a useful tool for the purposes of estate planning. In essence, one can buy a hedge fund inside an insurance policy and the value will grow tax-free and upon death the cash value of the policy passes to heirs tax-free.

By comparison, private placement life insurance is offered without a formal securities registration. The advantage with this approach is that the carrier customizes the investment options within the policy to meet the needs of the prospective investor. The key advantages to a private placement policy are there are no K-1s, vast investment platform and cost. Due to its nature, private placement life insurance is only offered to qualified purchasers seeking to invest large sums of money (often more than US$1 million) in the policy. In addition, an attorney will be needed to help draw up the documents, adding to the cost of the purchase.

== Offshore versus Domestic ==
While private placement life insurance ("PPLI") (a product also known as insurance wrappers) first developed offshore, United States carriers followed. The industry has witnessed significant growth in the placement of PPLI offshore. Offshore insurance companies specializing in PPLI typically offer the product as a financial service for high net worth clients and price their services as a provider, rather than as a traditional insurance carrier. For example, most offshore carriers are prohibited to maintain a domestic sales force. Also, offshore carriers cannot engage in onshore marketing.

The regulatory climate governing life insurance in certain offshore jurisdictions is also not as restrictive as may be found in the United States. Some of the better known jurisdictions to offer the product are Luxembourg, Ireland, Liechtenstein, Singapore, Barbados and Bermuda. While the lack of plentiful offshore regulation may not be comforting to traditional insurance consumers, high-net-worth individuals and their advisors are more likely to be able to carefully examine the merits and risks associated with insurance products from offshore carriers. Especially in Europe PPLI offers a lot of tax benefits. In all the European countries where the product is available the product offers at least a tax deferral, and in most European countries there are also substantial income, wealth and inheritance tax benefits. It is therefore that a growing number of financial advisors change existing offshore company, family foundation and trust structures in to PPLI solutions. The product also offers solid asset and investment protection features, which makes the product even more interesting.

== PPLI outside the USA ==
Private Placement Life Insurance in one form or another is gaining popularity throughout Europe and the rest of the world as it is used in many cases as a substitute for a trust or Foundation or to strengthen existing structures by adding ‘substance’. Many Tax authorities are looking through trusts and not accepting the trustees as the legal owner of the assets and this can cause difficulties that are not experienced when using PPLI.

Due to the unique nature of the relationship between the life company, the individual and the contents of the life policy, PPLI can be used to overcome specific issues such as management and control, beneficial ownership and substance. Since the Life company is recognized as the legal owner of the assets, in most cases they will also be outside the reach of future creditors.

Protection and Privacy are a major feature of PPLI and a policy issued by a Luxembourg insurer is covered by the unique ‘Triangle of Security’. With the introduction of directives in support of tax transparency by various governmental bodies over the last few years, the privacy of previously secure structures is not nearly so secure.

A properly set up contract can also protect against bank failure and ‘Bail Ins’ by holding cash off any bank balance sheet, whilst at the same time often providing capital guarantees not available elsewhere.

In the current climate legislating on money laundering, tax evasion and avoidance, structures with real commercial substance will be expected and demanded and PPLI contracts can provide this on a compliant basis.

PPLI policies can be an invaluable resource for those seeking tax efficiency, a decreased reporting burden, asset protection or confidentiality. However, due to the complexities an experienced adviser with specialist knowledge of international insurance arrangements should always be consulted.

== Expanded Worldwide Planning ==
There exist a number of structures that provide clients security from data breaches, erroneous government reporting, and the "blanket and indiscriminate nature of automatic exchange under CRS". Among these structures, Expanded Worldwide Planning (EWP) is a concept that has emerged. It offers international families a framework that enhances privacy and asset protection within a flexible, open architecture platform. For example, Advanced Financial Solutions Inc. is one proponent of EWP. It is an element of international taxation created to implement directives from several tax authorities following the 2008 worldwide recession. EWP gives privacy and compliance with tax laws. It also enhances protection from data breach and strengthens family security. It allows for a tax compliant system that still respects basic rights of privacy. EWP addresses the concerns of law firms and international planners about some aspects of CRS related to their clients' privacy. EWP assists with the privacy and welfare of families by protecting their financial records and keeping them in compliance with tax regulations.
