= Foreign personal holding company =

Foreign personal holding company income (FPHCI) is defined for U.S. controlled foreign corporation rules and, with modifications, for U.S. foreign tax credit rules. It consists of interest, dividends, rents, royalties, gains on property producing FPHCI, and certain other items. Exceptions are provided for active rents and royalties, certain related party rents and royalties, same country income, and certain other items. For purposes of the foreign tax credit, an additional exception requires look-through of certain income received from a controlled foreign corporation.

== Exceptions ==
Under the basic definition, there are exclusions and exceptions, which include:

- Rents and royalties derived in the active conduct of a trade or business (e.g., a car rental business). For royalties to qualify, the property must have been substantially developed by the recipient of the royalties.
- Interest and dividends received from related parties organized in the same country as the recipient.
- Rents and royalties received from related parties for use of property in the same country as the recipient is organized.
- For 2006 through 2009, interest or dividends received from any related party.

Generally, the related party exclusions do not apply if the item in the hands of the payor must be allocated or apportioned to Subpart F income. Thus, rents paid by CFC1 to CFC2 would be Subpart F income to CFC2 regardless of exceptions or exclusions if CFC1 would allocate the rental expense to Subpart F activities.

== Look-Through ==
For Foreign Tax Credit purposes, certain types of income are re-characterized (looked-through) based on the character of the income underlying the payment. Dividends received from a 10% or more owned controlled foreign corporation (CFC) with respect to which the recipient is a U.S. shareholder (whether or not the controlling shareholder) are re-characterized based on the earnings and profits (E&P) of the payor CFC. Interest, rents and royalties received from a similar CFC are recharacterized based on the type of income to which the payor must allocate and apportion the corresponding item of expense. Thus, if a Swiss corporation that has two owners, both U.S., pays its 20% owner interest of $1,000 and under allocation and apportionment principles its interest expense must be apportioned 42% to passive and 58% to general limitation income, then the interest income of that U.S. person from the Swiss corporation is $420 passive and $580 general limitation, and only the passive income constitutes FPHCI.
