= Controlled foreign corporation =

Company owned or controlled primarily by taxpayers of a different jurisdiction

Controlled foreign corporation (CFC) rules are features of an income tax system designed to limit artificial deferral of tax by using offshore low taxed entities. The rules are needed only with respect to income of an entity that is not currently taxed to the owners of the entity. Generally, certain classes of taxpayers must include in their income currently certain amounts earned by foreign entities they or related persons control.

A set of rules generally defines the types of owners and entities affected, the types of income or investments subject to current inclusion, exceptions to inclusion, and means of preventing double inclusion of the same income. Countries with CFC rules include the United States (since 1962), the United Kingdom, Germany, Japan, Australia, New Zealand, Brazil, Russia (since 2015), Sweden, and many others. Rules in different countries may vary significantly.

== Motivations ==
The tax law of many countries, including the United States, does normally not tax a shareholder of a corporation on the corporation's income until the income is distributed as a dividend. Prior to the first U.S. CFC rules, it was common for publicly traded companies to form foreign subsidiaries in tax havens and shift "portable" income to those subsidiaries. Income shifted included investment income (interest and dividends) and passive income (rents and royalties), as well as sales and services income involving related parties (see transfer pricing). U.S. tax on this income was avoided until the tax haven country paid a dividend to the shareholding company. This dividend could be avoided indefinitely by loaning the earnings to the shareholder without actually declaring a dividend, because interest on the loans could be deducted and such interest payments would not be considered income. The CFC rules of Subpart F, and later of other countries' provisions, were intended to cause current taxation to the shareholder where income was of a sort that could be artificially shifted or was made available to the shareholder. At the same time, such rules were intended not to interfere with active business income or transactions with unrelated parties.

== Basic mechanisms ==
The rules vary, so this paragraph may not exactly describe a particular tax system. However, the features listed are prevalent in most CFC systems. A domestic person who is a member of a foreign corporation (a CFC) that is controlled by domestic members must include in such person's income the person's share of the CFC's subject income. The includible income (often determined net of expenses) generally includes income received by the CFC:

- From investment or passive sources, including
  - Interest and dividends from unrelated parties,
  - Rents from unrelated parties, and
  - Royalties from unrelated parties;
- From purchasing goods from related parties or selling goods to related parties where the goods are both produced and for use outside the CFC's country;
- From performing services outside the CFC's country for related parties;
- From non-operating, insubstantial, or passive businesses, or
- Of a similar nature through lower-tier partnerships and/or corporations.

In addition, many CFC rules treat as a deemed dividend earnings of the CFC loaned by the CFC to domestic related parties. Further, most CFC rules permit exclusion from taxable income of dividends paid by a CFC from earnings previously taxed to members under the CFC rules.

CFC rules may have a threshold for domestic ownership, below which a foreign entity is not considered a CFC. Alternatively or in addition, domestic members of a foreign entity owning less than a certain portion or class of shares may be excluded from the deemed income regime.

== Belgian law ==
The Belgian CFC legislation is incorporated in article 185/2 of the Belgian Income Tax Code. Belgium has chosen the transactional approach rather than the entity approach.

However, Belgian CFC legislation is obsolete in practice given that the application of Belgian transfer pricing rules (i.e. article 185, § 2 of the Belgian Income Tax Code, allowing the Belgian tax authorities to implement an upwards adjustment of the profits in case of a breach of the arm's length principle) take precedence over CFC legislation.

== United States Subpart F rules ==
Enacted in 1962, these rules incorporate most of the features of CFC rules used in other countries. Subpart F was designed to prevent U.S. citizens and resident individuals and corporations from artificially deferring otherwise taxable income through use of foreign entities. The rules require that:

- A U.S. Shareholder
- of a Controlled Foreign Corporation ("CFC")

must include in their/its income currently

- Their/its share of Subpart F Income of the CFC ("Subpart F income"),
- Their/its share of aggregate income of 10% owned foreign corporations in excess of an aggregate return on depreciable tangible property of such 10% owned foreign corporations ("§951A"), and
- Their/its share of earnings and profits ("E&P") of the CFC that are invested in United States Property ("§956"),

and further exclude from his/its income any dividends distributed from such previously taxed income.

Each of the italicized terms above is defined:

- A Controlled Foreign Corporation is any corporation organized outside the U.S. (a foreign corporation) that is more than 50% owned by U.S. Shareholders.
- A U.S. Shareholder is any U.S. person (individual or entity) that owns 10% or more of the foreign corporation. Complex rules apply to attribute ownership of one person to another person.
- United States Property specifically includes obligations of or investments in related parties, tangible property with a physical situs in the U.S., and stock of a domestic corporation. It does not include bank deposits or obligations of unrelated persons.

Subpart F income includes the following:

- Foreign personal holding company income (FPHCI), including dividends, interest, rents, royalties, and gains from alienation of property that produces or could produce such income. Exceptions apply for dividends and interest from related persons organized in the same country as the CFC, active rents and royalties, rents and royalties from related persons in the same country as the CFC, and certain other items.
- Foreign base company sales income from buying goods from a related party and selling them to anyone or buying goods from anyone and selling them to a related party, where such goods are both made and for use outside the CFC's country of incorporation. A branch rule may cause transfers between a manufacturing branch of a CFC in one country and a sales branch in another country to trigger Subpart F income.
- Foreign base company services income from performing services for or on behalf of a related person. A substantial assistance rule can cause services performed for unrelated parties to be treated as performed for or on behalf of a related party.
- Foreign base company oil-related income from oil activities outside the CFC's country of incorporation.
- Insurance income from insurance or annuity contracts related to risks outside the CFC's country of incorporation.

but it does not include:

- Items of income which (after considering deductions, etc., under U.S. concepts) were subject to foreign income tax in excess of 90% of the highest marginal U.S. tax rate for the type of shareholder;
- De minimis amounts of Subpart F income in absence of other Subpart F income in the period;
- Such income if the CFC has a deficit in E&P, in which case it is deferred from recognition until the CFC has positive E&P.
- Any dividend received which is considered paid from amounts previously taxed under Subpart F.

In addition, after 2017 10% U.S. shareholders of CFCs must include in their income currently their share of aggregate return on depreciable tangible assets in excess of 10% for CFCs in which they are shareholders. Corporations that are U.S. shareholders get to deduct 50% of this inclusion.

Corporate U.S. shareholders are entitled to a foreign tax credit for their share of the foreign income taxes paid by a CFC with respect to E&P underlying a Subpart F inclusion. Creditable taxes are reduced by 20% for §951A inclusions.

To prevent avoidance of Subpart F, U.S. shareholders of a CFC must recharacterize gain on disposition of the CFC shares as a dividend. In addition, various special rules apply.

== United Kingdom rules ==
Controlled foreign company rules in the UK do not apply to individual shareholders, but otherwise they are similar to the U.S. rules. UK resident companies are subject to a charge for tax on undistributed income of low tax controlled foreign companies of which they are shareholders. Control for this purpose is not a mechanical test, rather one of factual control. However, control is considered to exist if the shareholder (or shareholder group of companies) owns 40% or more of voting interests.

A controlled company is a controlled foreign company if it is tax resident outside the UK and it is subject to a charge to tax less than it would have been were it a UK resident company. This is determined by comparing the actual charge to tax to a corresponding UK tax. In computing the corresponding tax, lower UK rates of tax on small companies are considered. Further, there are taken into account certain adjustments to income and fiscal years.

Certain exemptions apply. Generally, a foreign company will not be considered a controlled foreign company if it meets any of the following tests:

- It is tax resident in a "white list" of countries not considered to be tax havens, as maintained by HMRC. The list of exempt jurisdictions has 103 states and territories, including 20 of the 27 EU Member States. The 7 EU countries not on the list are Bulgaria, Cyprus, Estonia, Hungary, Ireland, Latvia and Lithuania. Countries on the exempt list include Panama and Belize, which are on the EU's list of non-cooperative tax jurisdictions.
- The foreign company maintains a policy whereby it distributed 90% or more of its available earnings each year (no longer applicable since 1 July 2009),
- The company qualifies for a De Minimis level of accounting profits being less than £200,000. This level of income has been in place since 1 January 2011. Previously the level was set at £50,000 of profits that would be chargeable to UK corporation tax if the company were UK resident (not necessarily the same as accounting profits).
- The foreign company meets an active business test,
- The foreign company is publicly quoted on a recognized securities exchange, or
- The group meets a no-tax-reduction motive test.
- The CFC’s profits are taxable in the jurisdiction of its tax residency at a rate not less than 75 per cent of UK corporation tax. For example, if the current corporation tax rate in the UK is 19%, the CFC's profits must be taxed at a rate not less than 14.25% in its jurisdiction in order to be exempt from taxation in the UK.

== German rules ==
The CFC provisions in Germany (§§ 7-14 AStG, Foreign Tax Act) apply to both individual and corporate shareholders of a controlled foreign company. Such shareholders must include in their currently taxable income as a deemed dividend their share of passive income if two tests are met:

- German residents control the non-German corporation and
- That corporation is taxed at a rate of less than 25% on the passive income.

Control in this case is ownership by all German residents of more than 50% of the vote or capital of the foreign corporation. Such ownership includes both direct ownership and ownership through related persons. In determining the 50% threshold, all German residents are considered, even those owning very minor amounts.

Passive income is all income which is not active income, as extensively defined. Active income, however, excludes income where there has been substantial assistance by a German related party in earning the income. Active income also excludes all income of a foreign corporation lacking sufficient substance. Generally, passive income resembles U.S. foreign personal holding company income (discussed above). However, deemed dividends may be exempted under some treaties.

== India ==
The CFC Rules were first introduced in Indian taxation as part of the proposed Direct Tax Code 2010. The CFC provisions was also retained in revised draft of Direct Tax Code, 2013. However, Direct Tax Code is yet to become law in India and consequently, there are no statutory provisions in existing Income Tax Act (Income Tax Act 1961) for the enactment of CFC Rules.

== Other countries ==
Japan taxes shareholders of foreign corporations where the operation of such corporation results in no or minimal foreign tax. However, there is a waiver where the foreign corporation conducts a substantial business.

New Zealand and Sweden each have CFC rules, following a "grey list" and a "white list" approach, respectively.

Australia has CFC rules similar to UK rules, but relies more on a "white list" of safe countries.

== Other anti-deferral measures ==
Several countries have adopted other measures aimed at preventing artificial deferral of passive or investment income. U.S. passive foreign investment companies (PFICs) require that shareholders in foreign mutual funds must include in their current taxable income their share of ordinary income and capital gains, or face a tax-and-interest regime.

== Avoiding CFC status ==
Under U.S. tax rules, a foreign entity may be classified for U.S. tax purposes as a corporation or a flow-through entity somewhat independently of its classification for foreign purposes. Under these "check-the-box" rules, shareholders may be able to elect to treat their shares income, deductions, and taxes of a foreign corporation as earned and paid by themselves. This permits U.S. individuals to obtain credits for foreign taxes paid by entities they own, which credits might otherwise not be available.

Artificial arrangements to avoid CFC status may be ignored in some jurisdictions under legislative provisions or court-developed law, such as substance over form doctrines.

European civil law may provide opportunities for formalistic agreements whereby practical control is maintained but formal definitions of control are not met.
