= Foreign tax credit =

Type of tax credit

A foreign tax credit (FTC) is generally offered by income tax systems that tax residents on worldwide income, to mitigate the potential for double taxation. The credit may also be granted in those systems taxing residents on income that may have been taxed in another jurisdiction. The credit generally applies only to taxes of a nature similar to the tax being reduced by the credit (taxes based on income) and is often limited to the amount of tax attributable to foreign source income. The limitation may be computed by country, class of income, overall, and/or another manner.

Most income tax systems therefore contain rules defining source of income (domestic, foreign, or by country) and timing of recognition of income, deductions, and taxes, as well as rules for associating deductions with income. For systems that separately tax business entities and their members, a deemed paid credit may be offered to entities receiving income (such as dividends) from other entities, with respect to taxes paid by the payor entities with respect to the income underlying the income recognized by the member. Systems with controlled foreign corporation rules may provide deemed paid credits with respect to deemed income inclusions under such rules. Some variations on the credit provide for a credit for hypothetical tax to encourage foreign investment (sometimes known as tax sparing).

Detailed rules vary among taxation systems. Examples below are given for illustration purposes only and may not reflect the rules in a particular tax system.

== Credit for foreign income taxes ==
A reduction of tax (credit) is often provided in income tax systems for similar income taxes paid to other countries (foreign taxes). This is generally referred to as a foreign tax credit. Amounts in excess of income tax are usually nonrefundable.

The credit is generally limited to those taxes of a nature similar to the tax against which the credit is allowed (for example, taxes on net income after the allowance of deductions). Rules defining taxes eligible for credit may refer to one or more of the following characteristics of such tax:

- Nature of the foreign levy (compulsory, payment for services, optional, discretionary as to rate, etc.),
- Whether the foreign country allows a similar credit,
- Whether the two countries have a tax treaty,
- Nature of the base on which the levy is imposed (gross receipts, income net of deductions, deemed profits, property, or other basis),
- Form in which payments are made (withholdings, payment by check or giro, or payments in kind),
- Political considerations (boycotts by taxing country, etc.),
- Conditions imposed by levying body on taxpayers (information disclosure, etc.), or
- Services or property provided by levying body or related persons as a result of the tax.

For example, the system in the United States allows FTC, subject to limitations, for foreign compulsory levies based on net income or withheld from gross receipts. It also denies FTC for taxes paid to countries requiring participation in certain boycotts or taxes paid in exchange for goods or services provided by the taxing authority for services. The United Kingdom allows FTC, subject to limitations, for foreign taxes of a nature similar to the income or corporation tax. This is allowed under tax treaties or as a unilateral credit. Canada similarly allows credits but limits the portion of foreign tax subject to deduction with respect to an oil or gas business.

Some countries do not tax persons whether resident of that country or not except on income considered to be from sources in that country or remitted to that country. Those countries tend to allow FTC only to residents and only with respect to taxes imposed on the income subject to tax in the home country. Singapore grants FTC only to residents and only with respect to income taxed in Singapore.

Many systems specify the time at which a foreign levy meeting the requirements for FTC becomes eligible for such credit, such as when the levy is withheld from income or otherwise paid or settled in cash or property. Some systems allow a credit when the tax would be properly chargeable under the domestic system. Others allow FTC by reference to the time the foreign item of income is chargeable to home country income tax. Some systems allow the credit with the tax would be recognized in financial statements. Some systems base the timing of recognition on the method of accounting of the taxpayer, possibly with an election by a cash basis taxpayer to recognize the tax at the time properly accrued.

Many income tax treaties require that the governments party to the treaty grant FTC even if the domestic law of such party do not grant such credit.

Federal systems, such as those in Canada, Switzerland, and the US, may have different rules for allowing a credit for extra-jurisdictional credits at the federal and state levels. Such rules may differ among sub-federal (provincial, cantonal, state) jurisdictions. Thus, for example, Canadian and US federal governments allow credits from all foreign levels, while Canadian provinces and US states tend to allow a credit for income taxes paid to other provinces and states but not for taxes paid to sovereign jurisdictions (countries). Sub-federal taxes may or may not be covered by income tax treaties.

== Limitation on credit ==
Most systems limit FTC in some manner. A common limitation is based on the domestic income tax considered generated by the foreign source income subject to tax. This limitation may be applied overall or at one or more of the following subsets:

- By country or region
- By type of income
- By member of a group
- By sub-type of domestic tax.

Amounts in excess of this limitation may be allowed to reduce prior period taxes (and thus potentially subject to refund) or future taxes. The period of carryover may be limited to a period of years or unlimited. For example, the US system, in 2009, permitted taxpayers to apply excess FTCs to reduce US federal income tax for the first prior year (carry back) and then successively for each of the next succeeding 10 years (carry forward). Germany, in 2007, permitted unlimited carry forward but no carry back.

Various countries have, at one point or another, limited FTC based on type of income. UK individual income tax limits FTC by the types of income taxed separately in the UK system. Thus, foreign taxes incurred with respect to trading income are limited separately from foreign taxes incurred with respect to investment income. From 1987 to 2006, the US limited FTC according to different categories or "baskets" of income, generally described as nine such baskets but in reality occasionally substantially more. The definitions of such baskets were collapsed into two baskets (with exceptions) beginning 2007. The US baskets are currently passive, consisting of foreign personal holding company income (interest, dividends, rents, royalties, and certain gains, with significant exceptions) and all other (general limitation), with some exceptions generally not applicable.

Countries having alternative tax regimes imposing certain minimum income taxes may modify the rules for computing FTC for those minimum taxes.

Generally, where foreign taxes have been deducted or deemed deducted from income, and a credit or reduction of tax is claimed, the amount of income subject to tax is the amount before the reduction by foreign tax.

== Defining foreign source income ==
Where a system imposes limits on FTC based in some manner on foreign source income (FSI), the system generally provides rules for determining whether income is foreign or domestic source. The rules may be relatively simple or quite complex. (For simplicity of wording below, the phrase "sourced to" specifies in the target the place [foreign or domestic] constituting the source of the income in the object for computing FTC limitation.) The following discussion explains US and Canadian rules and certain other variations on one of these rules to illustrate the manners in which systems define FSI and the potential level of complexity. The rules vary highly by country.

=== US approach ===
US rules are the same for individuals and entities, and for residents and nonresidents. Under US rules, source is determined for gross income (sales plus other income less cost of goods sold), then expenses and deductions are allocated and apportioned to such income (see below). The source of income is determined separately for each type of income.

- Interest and dividends are sourced to the tax residence of the payor of the income. Exceptions are provided for income effectively connected with a trade or business, which is sourced to the place of such trade or business. The US provides exceptions for certain interest and dividend income.
- Income from the use of property (rents and royalties) is sourced to the place the property from which the income is derived is used.
- Income from performance of services is sourced to the place the services are performed. This may require allocation of income where services are partly performed in one place and partly in another.
- Foreign exchange gains and losses are generally sourced foreign.
- Gains from disposition of foreign assets, including shares of companies, may be sourced either foreign or domestic, or such sourcing may depend on other factors. Under the US system, such gains may also be recharacterized as dividends in certain cases.
- Deemed income under controlled foreign corporation rules is generally sourced the same as dividends from those corporations would be sourced.
- Gains from realty are generally sourced to the situs of the realty.
- Income from sale of non-inventory property other than realty is generally sourced to the taxpayer's residence.

=== Canadian approach ===
Canada follows a somewhat different approach than that above for business income. Both individuals and entities may have both business and non-business income. The source of business income is determined differently for each type of business based on the place in which the business is predominantly conducted. Such determination is based on different considerations based on the nature of different businesses. For example, income from merchandise trading is sourced to where the sales are habitually completed, but other relevant factors may be considered. By contrast, income from trading intangible property such as stocks and bonds is sourced to where the decisions related to such trading are normally made.

For Canadian tax purposes, the source of non-business income varies by type of income and is determined similarly to the US approach. Non-business interest and dividends is generally sourced to residence of the payor. However, the source of dividend income is relevant only for individuals, as corporations are not eligible for FTC with respect to dividend income. Non-business income from use of property is sourced to where the property is situated, used, or exploited.

Canadian individuals determine the source of income from employment under three different approaches. The default approach is such income is sourced to the primary place of employment. However, if the employment income is subject to tax in another country, the income is sourced based on the ratio of days worked in that country to total days worked. Both approaches are subject to modification under treaties.

Source of income for Canadian tax purposes, like Canadian FTC, is by country.

=== Source of inventory property sales income ===
There are several other approaches in use to source income from sale of inventory property. In the UK, such income is sourced to the location of the trading activity giving rise to the income. In the US, the source varies. Income from inventory produced by the taxpayer or certain related parties is sourced 50% to place title to the inventory passes to the purchaser and 50% based on the situs of assets used in production and distribution of the inventory. Income from sale of purchased inventory is sourced to place of title passage. However, purchases from certain related parties are effectively ignored and the inventory may be considered produced by the taxpayer. Various other systems have rules for determining what portion of income from inventory produced domestically and sold foreign or vice versa is sourced foreign.

== Associating deductions with income ==
Where a system limits the credit based on domestic tax generated by foreign source net income, it must provide a mechanism for determining net income subject to home country tax, including associating deductions or exclusions with income for such purpose. Such mechanisms tend to be complex or rely on local accounting rules or judgments. The process of associating deductions with income is referred to allocation and apportionment in some jurisdictions.

Most rules rely to some extent on factual relationships between deductions and income produced by incurring the deduction. Thus, all deductions related to producing a set of income would be allocated to that set of income. To the extent a particular set of income includes both foreign and domestic income, the deductions so allocated are then apportioned in some manner in some systems. Canadian rules require that deductions reasonably regarded as wholly allocable to income form a particular place be allocated thereto, as well as that portion of other deductions reasonably regarded as applicable to that income. Under US rules, apportionment of most deductions may be done based on relative sales, gross income (sales less cost of goods sold), space used, headcount, or some other rational and systematic basis.

The US has rules requiring that certain deductions be apportioned among all income on a formulary basis. These rules are quite complex. Interest expense must be apportioned based on relative adjusted tax basis of assets that produce or could produce the particular type of income. Research and experimentation expenses must be apportioned based on either relative sales or relative gross income. Taxpayers must elect which base to use, and such election applies for five years. State income taxes must be apportioned based on complex formulae. Stewardship and supportive expenses must each be allocated and apportioned under one of several methods. Note that few other countries have developed rules to this level of complexity and specificity.

== Refunds and adjustments ==
Most systems require corrective action by taxpayers if the amount of tax previously claimed as FTC changes. Such changes could occur, for example, because of carryback of deductions, losses, or credits in the foreign country, changes on examination of returns, etc. The form of corrective action varies by jurisdiction, and may vary within a jurisdiction by type of adjustment.

US rules differentiate three forms of adjustment to foreign taxes: adjustments to taxes paid by the taxpayer which did reduce actual US taxes paid, adjustments to taxes deemed paid which did not exhaust the pool of deemed paid taxes, and adjustments which did not reduce US taxes yet. Taxpayers with the first type of adjustment must amend tax returns and pay or claim a refund for the difference in tax. Only corporate taxpayers can have the second type of adjustment. Those taxpayers must reduce the pool of taxes going forward and advise the government of the change. Taxpayers with the third type of adjustments must advise the government of the change and make appropriate adjustments to unused FTC carried over.

== Deemed paid FTC ==
Some countries grant FTC to corporations owning shares of a foreign corporation when the shareholder receives a dividend or other deemed income (for example, under controlled foreign corporation provisions) based on the dividend payor's taxes and income. Under such systems, generally the amount of credit is the foreign taxes paid by the foreign corporation times the fraction of earnings distributed to the shareholder as a dividend. Generally, the amount of dividend is "grossed up" for the amount of available credit, before limitations, effectively charging the shareholder with home country tax for the income on a pre-tax basis. The deemed paid credit mechanism may be applied up the chain of corporate distributions, and may be subject to ownership limitations.

== Foreign tax credit on stock dividends ==
Dividends received by resident individuals and corporations are included in taxable income by most countries. A foreign tax credit is then allowed for any foreign income taxes paid by the shareholder on the dividends, such as by withholding of tax. Where the country taxes dividends at a lower rate, the tax eligible for credit is generally reduced. For example, US tax law requires individuals to reduce the foreign income tax by the ratio of the rate differential on dividends (39.6% less 20%) to the maximum individual tax rate (39.6%). Some countries have at times allowed shareholders a credit against the shareholder's tax for taxes paid by the corporations. Several countries allow corporations who own significant shares of other corporations to claim a foreign tax credit for a portion of the foreign income taxes paid by the owned corporation when the shareholding corporation receives a dividend.

== Examples ==
=== Effect of FTC on worldwide tax burden ===
Assume that Carpet Ltd is a UK resident company publicly traded company which buys and sells carpets through offices in UK and Germany. Carpet Ltd's tax rate in the UK is 33% on its business net income of £1 million. Carpet Ltd is also subject to tax in Germany on the equivalent of £100,000 at a tax rate of 37%, or £37,000. The UK limits FTC to the amount of UK tax that would be on the foreign (non-UK) source income. If Carpet Ltd has no other foreign source income under UK concepts, Carpet Ltd's UK tax is £330,000 less FTC of £33,000, or £297,000. Total taxes would be £297,000 + £37,000 or £334,000. On the other hand, if Carpet Ltd had additional foreign source trading profits of £20,000, the FTC limit would be sufficient to use all of the German tax as credits, and UK tax after FTC would be £293,000. Thus, the worldwide tax rate with FTC tends to be at a minimum the home country tax rate and a maximum a foreign country tax rate, if higher.

=== Effect of expense allocation ===
Differences in expense allocation rules and transfer pricing can impact this result. If, in the example above, Carpet Ltd had £10,000 of expenses of the Germany operation which Germany disallowed as not allocable to German income under German concepts, the German tax would increase to £40,700 while the UK FTC limitation would remain £33,000. This would increase worldwide taxes by the German tax on the disallowed expenses, to a total of £337,300.

=== Deemed paid credit ===
Assume a German 100% subsidiary of a US company has earned $1,000 of pre-tax income and paid $380 of German taxes over its history. If the Germany company pays a dividend of $100, the US company will, subject to limitations, be entitled to $38 of FTC.

== Tax sparing ==
Tax sparing refers to granting a home country foreign tax credit for specific foreign taxes that would have been payable but for tax exemption in the foreign country. The concept of tax sparing was once fairly widespread, but has been reconsidered by many countries. The apparent intent of the provisions was for developed nations to provide economic incentives for enterprises in such nations to invest in developing nations. Under the Germany/Indonesia tax treaty of 1977 (a typical provision), Germany allowed a credit with respect to dividends, interest and royalties for Indonesian taxes that would have been paid but for the provisions of Indonesian law designed to promote economic development in Indonesia.

== Additional resources ==
=== US tax ===
Official:

- 26 U.S.C. § 1248 and 26 CFR thereunder.
- IRS publications 54, 514 .
- IRS Forms 1116, 1118, 2555, 5471, 8858, 8865, and related instructions.

Treatises:

- Kuntz & Peroni, U.S. International Taxation, Warren, Gorham & Lamont.
- Moore & Outslay, U.S. Tax Aspects of Doing Business Abroad, AICPA.
- Doernberg, International Taxation in a Nutshell, West Publishing.

=== UK tax ===
Official:

- HMRC International Tax Manual, sections 160000 et seq.
- Income and Corporation Tax Act of 1988 (text not fully amended).

=== Canadian tax ===
Official:

- Income Tax Act.
- Income Tax Act Regulations.
- Income Tax Folio: Foreign Tax Credit S5-F2-C1.
