= Internal Revenue Code Part I =

US law imposing federal income tax

Part 1 of the Internal Revenue Code (26 U.S.C. § 1-5 or simply IRC Part 1), titled "Tax on Individuals" is the part of the Internal Revenue Code that contains the sections imposing a federal income tax on the taxable income of individuals in the United States of America, and sets forth the amount of the tax to be paid. The Part contains five sections, most significantly section 1, titled "Tax Imposed", which "imposes an income tax on the income of every individual who is a citizen or resident of the United States", and also provides for the taxation some non-resident aliens. The section historically contained tables from which the exact tax owed could be computed based on the marital status and filing options of the taxpayer. While these tables remain in the statute as examples, the actual amounts are provided by the Internal Revenue Service and regularly adjusted for cost of living changes. Section 1 also imposes an income tax on income earned by certain estates and trusts. A similar tax on corporations is set forth in IRC §11, but "the primary target for the income tax is the individual taxpayer", as set forth in section 1, and some businesses, such as sole proprietorships and single-member LLCs that do not elect to be taxed as a corporation are disregarded entities, so that if the owner of such an entity is an individual, then its activities will be reflected on the owner's tax return under section 1.

Although the tax imposed by section 1 applies to all taxpayers regardless of age, special provisions are made in section, 1(g) (previously section 1.1(i)1T), for "unearned income of certain minor children", also known as the "kiddie tax". Another highly controverted provision in the section, 1(h), provides the rules for taxation of capital gains. Other points of dispute arising from the section have included the so-called "marriage penalty" (a circumstance in which married households with multiple income earners tend to pay a higher rate than households of unmarried people), and the so-called "dividend tax" (a circumstance where corporate payouts to shareholders are taxed upon distribution despite previously having been taxed when the income was received by the corporation).

Since the consolidation of individual tax rates into section 1 in 1954, the section has been amended dozens of times through at least twenty-nine separate acts of Congress, reflecting repeated revisions to federal income tax rates, filing statuses, and related provisions. Amendments have frequently focused on the number of tax brackets and the rate of taxation in each bracket, as well as attempts to address the aforementioned points of dispute. Other sections of this Part have been amended less frequently. Section 2 of this Part provides definitions for some of the terms used in section 1, particularly for the meanings of "head of household" and "surviving spouse" within the context of the IRC. Section 3 originally contained an optional tax structure for persons with an income of less than $5,000 per year, but was later changed by amendment to a tax table for lower income individuals, while section 4, originally containing additional rules for this optional tax structure, was repealed on October 4, 1976. Finally, section 5 contains "Cross references relating to tax on individuals" noting other sections of the tax code relevant to persons such as nonresident aliens, and members of the United States Armed Forces.

== History ==
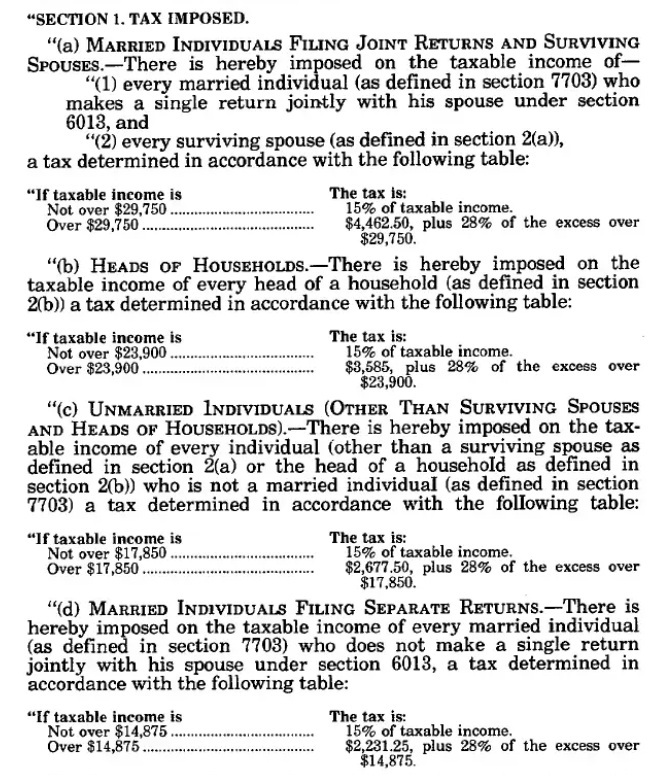
IRC sections 1(a) through 1(d) as they appeared after the 1986 consolidation of tax brackets

On February 10, 1939, the various tax statutes of the United States were recodified by an Act of Congress as the "Internal Revenue Code" ("IRC"; later known as the "Internal Revenue Code of 1939"). The 1939 Code was published as Volume 53, Part I, of the United States Statutes at Large and as Title 26 of the United States Code. On August 16, 1954, in connection with a general overhaul of the Internal Revenue Service, the IRC was greatly reorganized and expanded by the 83rd United States Congress (by Chapter 736, Pub. L. 83–591), with Ward M. Hussey as the principal drafter. To prevent confusion with the 1939 Code, the new version was thereafter referred to as the "Internal Revenue Code of 1954" and the prior version as the "Internal Revenue Code of 1939". The lettering and numbering of subtitles and sections were completely changed, with provisions governing taxation of individuals being moved into Part I of Subchapter A, consisting of sections 1 through 5. Provisions specifically imposing the income tax that were previously distributed in sections 11 and 12 of the 1939 code were consolidated into the new section 1.

The head of household filing status ultimately defined in section 2 was created in 1951 to acknowledge the additional financial burdens faced by single people caring for dependents. Consequently, it provides single parents and other people caring for qualifying dependents with a larger standard deduction and preferential tax rates compared to single filers, reducing their tax liabilities.

President Ronald Reagan made simplification of the tax code the central focus of his second term domestic agenda. Working with Speaker of the House Tip O'Neill, a Democrat who also favored tax reform, Reagan overcame significant opposition from members of Congress in both parties to pass the Tax Reform Act of 1986. The bill was signed by Reagan on October 22. The top tax rate for individuals for tax year 1987 was lowered from 50% to 33%. Many lower level tax brackets were consolidated, and the upper income level of the bottom rate (married filing jointly) was increased from $5,720/year to $29,750/year. This package ultimately consolidated tax brackets from fifteen levels of income to four levels of income. Another significant legislative change was made in 2003, when president George W. Bush signed into law the Jobs and Growth Tax Relief Reconciliation Act of 2003 (JGTRRA), which changed tax rates significantly, particularly with respect to tax rates for certain capital gains and qualified dividend income.

== Provisions ==
Within the layout of the IRC, Part 1 appears as follows:

- Subtitle A – Income Taxes (§§ 1–1563)
  - Chapter 1 – Normal Taxes and Surtaxes (§§ 1–1400T)
    - Subchapter A – Determination of Tax Liability (§§ 1–59A)
      - Part I – Tax on Individuals (§§ 1–5)
        - Section 1 – Tax imposed
        - Section 2 – Definitions and special rules
        - Section 3 – Tax tables for individuals
        - Section 4 – [Repealed]
        - Section 5 – Cross references relating to tax on individuals

Section 1 imposes the Federal income tax on the "taxable income" of individuals (mainly in subsections (a) through (d)), and on the taxable income of certain estates and trusts (subsection e). The section sets forth the formula for what amount of taxable income must be paid to the United States. The U.S. federal income tax is structured progressively: as taxable income rises, the marginal tax rate applied to additional income increases, so higher-income individuals pay a larger percentage of their income in tax. This progressivity aims to reflect taxpayers’ differing ability to pay and to provide a degree of income redistribution through the tax code.

For individuals, section 1 divides income earners into categories depending on whether they are married individuals filing jointly, or their surviving spouses (section 1(a)); heads of households (section 1(b)); unmarried individuals (section 1(c)); or married individuals filing separately (section 1(d)). Under the original federal income tax enacted in 1913, married taxpayers were taxed separately under the same progressive rate schedule as unmarried individuals. Married couples were not permitted to file joint returns until 1918. The modern filing-status structure developed gradually in response to perceived inequities between taxpayers in community property states compared to those in common-law-property states. The Revenue Act of 1948 amended the section to incorporate income-splitting benefits nationally for married couples filing jointly. Section 1(e) provides for taxation of income received by estates and trusts, but should not be confused with estate tax imposed upon property of the recently deceased, which is established elsewhere in the IRC. In 1969, Congress expanded the number of tax rate schedules from two to four, adjusting rates so that unmarried taxpayers would not pay more than 120% of the liability of married couples with the same income.

Subsections (a) through (d) actually list the tax rate schedules for the year 1993. Subsection (f) directs the Internal Revenue Service to adjust these baseline figures for inflation and release updated brackets for each subsequent taxable year. Based in part on the provisions of subsections (f) and (i), the tax rate schedules for 1994 and subsequent years (reflecting, among other things, tax rate changes and cost of living adjustments) are therefore promulgated by the IRS. In other words, the official tax rate schedules for years 1994 and thereafter are no longer found in the text of section 1 itself. Tax rates are, to a degree, indexed to inflation to prevent lower-income earners from being pushed into higher tax brackets over time.

=== Marriage penalty ===
The fact that married couples where both partners have an income still generally pay income taxes at a higher rate under section 1 is generally known as the marriage penalty. In 1981, Congress tried to mitigate the marriage penalty through a deduction for two-earner married couples, but this was repealed in 1986. Various constitutional challenges to the filing-status and rate-schedule structure have been brought through lawsuits asserting equal protection and due process theories, but these have not prevailed.

Although numerous efforts have been made to amend section 1 to reduce the effects of the marriage penalty, it has been asserted that it is mathematically impossible for a tax system to have all of (a) marginal tax rates that increase with income, (b) joint filing with (full) income splitting for married couples, and (c) combined tax bills that are (entirely) unaffected by two people's marital status. Partial income splitting models, like section 1 provides through its "married filing jointly" option, allow only a part of the income to be transferred among spouses in order to balance such criteria.

=== Dividend tax ===
In 1936, dividends were made subject to the ordinary income tax, but from 1954 to 1983, various exemptions and credits had dividends taxed at a lower rate. Following this, there was an eighteen-year period (1985–2003) in which dividends were fully taxed at an individual's income tax bracket. During this period, the top tax bracket ranged between 28% and 50%. However, in 2003 former president George W. Bush enacted the Jobs and Growth Tax Relief Reconciliation Act of 2003 (JGTRRA), which changed tax rates significantly. These 2003 tax cuts, codified as section 1(h) of the Internal Revenue Code, established preferential tax rates for certain capital gains and qualified dividend income. In particular, section 1(h)(11) extended capital gains treatment to certain dividends received by individual taxpayers. The legislation sought to reduce the effects of the "double taxation" of corporate earnings, under which profits are taxed both at the corporate level and again when distributed to shareholders as dividends. Under section 1(h)(11), "qualified dividend income" from domestic corporations and certain foreign corporations became taxable at the same reduced rates applicable to long-term capital gains rather than at ordinary income tax rates. Preferential treatment of dividend income under section 1(h)(11) generated substantial debate concerning its effects on economic growth and corporate behavior. Supporters argued that lower dividend tax rates would encourage corporations to distribute earnings to shareholders and promote investment, while critics questioned whether the reductions would significantly affect corporate payout decisions.

=== Kiddie tax ===
Because marginal rates are higher for high-income earners, shifting income from a high-bracket taxpayer to someone taxed at a lower rate (e.g., a child with little or no other income) could substantially reduce a family's overall tax burden. Such shifting, if unrestricted, would undercut the redistributive goal of a progressive tax system. Recognizing that incentive, as part of the Tax Reform Act of 1986, Congress enacted a special rule informally called the "kiddie tax", requiring certain unearned income of children to be taxed at the parent's marginal rate. Thus, the "kiddie tax" exists as an anti-avoidance measure: it preserves the intended progressivity of the federal income-tax system while preventing families from exploiting lower child-income tax rates by shifting passive or investment income to children, who often face lower tax rates.

The kiddie tax has undergone substantial changes since its implementation. Enacted as part of the Tax Reform Act of 1986 and first applied to tax years beginning after December 31, 1986, the original rule was codified in Internal Revenue Code § 1(i) and applied only to children under age 14. In 1990, the Omnibus Budget Reconciliation Act of 1990 redesignated the provision as IRC § 1(g). A 2006 amendment raised the age threshold to include dependents under age 18, and in 2007, the Small Business and Work Opportunity Tax Act of 2007 further extended coverage to full-time students under age 24 who do not provide more than half of their support with earned income.

Major structural changes were enacted by the Tax Cuts and Jobs Act of 2017 (TCJA), which temporarily taxed a child's unearned income using estate and trust tax brackets for tax years 2018 and 2019 — often resulting in higher taxes for affected families. The change generated significant criticism, particularly regarding its impact on survivors receiving military benefits. In response, the SECURE Act of 2019 repealed the TCJA calculation and restored the use of parents’ marginal tax rates, retroactive to 2018. Beginning in 2020, the kiddie tax returned to its pre-TCJA framework.

=== Progressive tax rates ===
Each categorization of taxpayers in the first five subsections of section 1 lists a set of progressive tax rates for taxpayers falling within that subsection. For example, the table for "(b) Heads of households" for the year 1993 states:

There is hereby imposed on the taxable income of every head of a household (as defined in section 2 (b)) a tax determined in accordance with the following table:

If taxable income is:	The tax is:
Not over $29,600	15% of taxable income.
Over $29,600 but not over $76,400	$4,440, plus 28% of the excess over $29,600.
Over $76,400 but not over $127,500	$17,544, plus 31% of the excess over $76,400.
Over $127,500 but not over $250,000	$33,385, plus 36% of the excess over $127,500.
Over $250,000	$77,485, plus 39.6% of the excess over $250,000.

People meeting the description set forth in section 2 of a "head of a household" with a taxable income of $50,000 for the year 1993 would have looked to the table to see that their income falls within the category of persons earning "Over $29,600 but not over $76,400". The tax would be:

$4,440, plus 28% of the excess over $29,600

which is equal to

$4,440, plus 28% of ($50,000 – $29,600)

$50,000 minus $29,600 equals $20,400, and 28% of $20,400 is $5,712, so the total tax due on an income of $50,000 would be ($4,400 + $5,712), for a final total of $10,152. By comparison, a person realizing one million dollars of taxable income would have been assessed $374,485 for the same period ($77,485 + 39.6% ($1,000,000–$250,000)). A base of $50,000 taxable income would thus yield an after-tax income of $39,848, while a base $1,000,000 income would yield an after-tax income of $625,515. These, however, are base figures, to which a number of important variables are applied. For example, the tax applies only to taxable income, which is defined in IRC §63 as gross income minus allowable deductions to gross income, personal exemptions, and either the standard deduction or itemized deductions. Gross income, in turn, is defined in IRC §61. Since taxpayers may make a variety of deductions, such as the deduction for selling a piece of property at a loss allowed under IRC §165, a taxpayer's gross income will be higher than their taxable income.

== See also ==
- Capital gains tax in the United States
