= Tax ladder =

Term in US federal personal income tax

Tax ladder is a term sometimes used to refer to the formula for calculating a taxpayer's tax liability in a given year for United States federal personal income tax purposes. The term "ladder" is used because as your taxable income increases, you "climb" the ladder and your tax rate increases.

The formula begins with the taxpayer's gross income, as defined by the Internal Revenue Code § 61(a). From gross income, the taxpayer may subtract the amount of any deductions listed in § 62(a) ("above-the-line deductions") to arrive at an adjusted gross income. The taxpayer then subtracts the appropriate amount for personal exemptions under § 151(d)(1) (as adjusted annually for inflation under § 151(d)(4)). Finally, the taxpayer subtracts either the appropriate standard deduction under § 63(c) or the total of itemized deductions under § 63(d) to arrive at the taxpayer's taxable income for that tax year.

Taxable income serves as the base against which the taxpayer's tax rate is applied. After multiplying taxable income by the tax rate, the taxpayer may subtract the amount of any credits, then must add any additions to tax (such as the alternative minimum tax). This calculation results in the taxpayer's tax liability, which is the actual amount the taxpayer owes for that tax year.

== See also ==
- U.S. Federal Income Tax Rate Schedule
