= Tax bracket =

Division at which a tax rate changes

Tax brackets are the divisions at which tax rates change in a progressive tax system (or an explicitly regressive tax system, though that is rarer). Essentially, tax brackets are the cutoff values for taxable income—income past a certain point is taxed at a higher rate.

== Example ==
Suppose that there are three tax brackets: 10%, 20%, and 30%. The 10% rate applies to income from $1 to $10,000; the 20% rate applies to income from $10,001 to $20,000; and the 30% rate applies to all income above $20,000.

Under this system, someone earning $10,000 is taxed at 10%, paying a total of $1,000. Someone earning $5,000 pays $500, and so on.

Meanwhile, someone who earns $25,000 faces a more complicated calculation. The rate on the first $10,000 is 10%, from $10,001 to $20,000 is 20%, and above that is 30%. Thus, they pay $1,000 for the first $10,000 of income (10%), $2,000 for the second $10,000 of income (20%), and $1,500 for the last $5,000 of income (30%), In total, they pay $4,500, or an 18% average tax rate.

In practice the computation is simplified by using point–slope form or slope–intercept form of the linear equation for the tax on a specific bracket, either as tax on the bottom amount of the bracket plus the tax on the marginal amount within the bracket:

$$\$3\,000 + (\$25\,000 - \$20\,000) \times 30\% = \$3\,000 + \$1\,500 = \$4\,500,$$

or the tax on the entire amount (at the marginal rate), minus the amount that this overstates tax on the bottom end of the bracket.

$$\$25\,000 \times 30\% - \$3\,000 = \$7\,500 - \$3\,000 = \$4\,500.$$

See Progressive tax#Computation for details.

== Tax brackets in Australia ==
=== Individual income tax rates (residents) ===
For the 2026–27 financial year, the following income tax rates apply to Australian residents entitled to the full tax-free threshold. All amounts are in Australian dollars.

Australian resident income tax rates, 2026–27
Annual taxable income	Tax on this income
$0–$18,200	Nil
Over $18,200 to $45,000	15c for each $1 over $18,200
Over $45,000 to $135,000	$4,020 plus 30c for each $1 over $45,000
Over $135,000 to $190,000	$31,020 plus 37c for each $1 over $135,000
Over $190,000	$51,370 plus 45c for each $1 over $190,000

These rates exclude the Medicare levy, generally 2% of taxable income, and any Medicare levy surcharge. Reductions or exemptions from the levy may apply.

== Tax brackets in Canada ==
For the 2026 tax year, the following federal income tax rates apply in Canada. All amounts are in Canadian dollars. Each rate applies only to the portion of taxable income within the corresponding bracket, before tax credits.

Canadian federal income tax rates, 2026
Annual taxable income	Marginal tax rate
$0–$58,523	14%
Over $58,523 to $117,045	20.5%
Over $117,045 to $181,440	26%
Over $181,440 to $258,482	29%
Over $258,482	33%

The basic personal amount provides a non-refundable tax credit.

Provincial or territorial income tax applies in addition to federal income tax, including in Quebec. The applicable provincial or territorial rates generally depend on the taxpayer's province or territory of residence on 31 December of the tax year.

== Tax brackets in India ==
Income tax slabs applicable for financial year 2015–16 (Assessment Year- 2016–17)is summarized below:

Men and Women under 60 years	
Up to ₹ 250,000	Nothing
₹ 250,001 to ₹ 500,000	5% of the amount exceeding ₹ 250,000 (2.5 lacs)
₹ 500,001 to ₹ 1,000,000	₹ 12,500 + 20% of the amount exceeding ₹ 500,000 (5 Lacs)
More than ₹ 1,000,000	₹ 1,12,500 + 30% of the amount exceeding ₹ 1,000,000 (10 lacs)

Men and Women between 60 and 80 years	
Up to ₹ 300,000	Nothing
₹ 300,001 to ₹ 500,000	5% of the amount exceeding ₹ 300,000 (3 lacs)
₹ 500,001 to ₹ 1,000,000 e	₹ 15,000 + 20% of the amount exceeding ₹ 500,000 (5 lacs)
More than ₹ 1,000,000	₹ 115,000 + 30% of the amount exceeding ₹ 1,000,000 (10 lacs)

Very Senior Citizens above 80 years	
Up to ₹ 500,000	Nothing
₹ 500,001 to ₹ 1,000,000	20% of the amount exceeding ₹ 5 lacs
More than ₹ 1,000,000	₹ 100,000 + 30% of the amount exceeding ₹ 10 lacs

== Tax brackets in Malaysia ==
Malaysia has the following income tax brackets based on assessment year.

=== Assessment Year 2020 ===
Taxable income	Tax payable on this income	Effective tax rate
MYR 0 – 5,000	Nil	0%
MYR 5,001 – 20,000	1% for each MYR 1 over MYR 5,000	0 – 0.75%
MYR 20,001 – 35,000	MYR 150 + 3% for each MYR 1 over MYR 20,000	0.75 – 1.71%
MYR 35,001 – 50,000	MYR 600 + 8% for each MYR 1 over MYR 35,000	1.71 – 3.60%
MYR 50,001 – 70,000	MYR 1,800 + 14% for each MYR 1 over MYR 50,000	3.60 – 6.57%
MYR 70,001 – 100,000	MYR 4,600 + 21% for each MYR 1 over MYR 70,000	6.57 – 10.90%
MYR 100,001 – 250,000	MYR 10,900 + 24% for each MYR 1 over MYR 100,000	10.90 – 18.76%
MYR 250,001 – 400,000	MYR 46,900 + 24.5% for each MYR 1 over MYR 250,000	18.76 – 20.91%
MYR 400,001 – 600,000	MYR 83,650 + 25% for each MYR 1 over MYR 400,000	20.91 – 22.28%
MYR 600,001 – 1,000,000	MYR 133,650 + 26% for each MYR 1 over MYR 600,000	22.27 – 23.77%
MYR 1,000,001 – 2,000,000	MYR 237,650 + 28% for each MYR 1 over MYR 1,000,000	23.76 – 25.88%
MYR 2,000,001 and over	MYR 517,650 + 30% for each MYR 1 over MYR 2,000,000	25.88% – 30.00%

== Tax brackets in Malta ==
Malta has the following tax brackets for income received during 2012

Single Rates:

Taxable income	Tax on this income
€0 – 8,500	Nil
€8,501 – 14,500	15%
€14,501 – 19,500	25%
€19,501 and over	35%

Married Rates:

Taxable income	Tax on this income
€0 – 11,900	Nil
€11,901 – 21,200	15%
€21,201 – 28,700	25%
€28,701 and over	35%

== Tax brackets in New Zealand ==
New Zealand has the following income tax brackets (as of 1 October 2010). All values in New Zealand dollars, with the ACC Earners' levy not included.

Taxable income	Tax on this income
$0 – $14,000	10.5%
$14,001 – $48,000	17.5%
$48,001 – $70,000	30%
$70,001 and over	33%

45% when the employee does not complete a declaration form (IR330).

ACC Earners' Levy for the 2010 tax year is 2.0%, an increase from 1.7% in the 2008 tax year.

== Tax brackets in Singapore ==
All amounts are in Singapore dollars. Each rate applies only to the portion of chargeable income within the corresponding bracket, before tax rebates.

Singapore resident income tax rates, 2024 onward
Annual chargeable income	Marginal tax rate
$0–$20,000	0%
Over $20,000 to $30,000	2%
Over $30,000 to $40,000	3.5%
Over $40,000 to $80,000	7%
Over $80,000 to $120,000	11.5%
Over $120,000 to $160,000	15%
Over $160,000 to $200,000	18%
Over $200,000 to $240,000	19%
Over $240,000 to $280,000	19.5%
Over $280,000 to $320,000	20%
Over $320,000 to $500,000	22%
Over $500,000 to $1,000,000	23%
Over $1,000,000	24%

== Tax brackets in South Africa ==
The Minister of Finance announced new tax rates for the 2012–2013 tax year. They are as follows :

=== Tax brackets for the 2012 year of assessment ===
Taxable income	Tax on this income
R0–R150,000	18% of every Rand
R150,001–R235,000	R27,000 plus 25% of the amount above R150,000
R235,001–R325,000	R48,250 plus 30% of the amount above R235,000
R325,001–R455,000	R75,250 plus 35% of the amount above R325,000
R455,001–R580,000	R120,750 plus 38% of the amount above R455,000
R580,001 and over	R168,250 plus 40% of the amount above R580,000

=== Tax brackets for the 2013 year of assessment ===
Taxable income	Tax on this income
R0–R160,000	18% of every Rand
R160,001–R250,000	R28,800 plus 25% of the amount above R160,000
R250,001–R346,000	R51,300 plus 30% of the amount above R250,000
R346,001–R484,000	R80,100 plus 35% of the amount above R346,000
R484,001–R617,000	R128,400 plus 38% of the amount above R484,000
R617,001 and over	R178,940 plus 40% of the amount above R617,000

== Tax brackets in Switzerland ==
Personal income tax is progressive in nature. The total rate does not usually exceed 40%.

The Swiss Federal Tax Administration website provides a broad outline of the Swiss tax system, and full details and tax tables are available in PDF documents.

The complexity of the system is partly because the Confederation, the 26 Cantons that make up the federation, and about 2,900 communes [municipalities] levy their own taxes based on the Federal Constitution and 26 Cantonal Constitutions.

== Tax brackets in Taiwan ==
=== Income tax rates (Individual) ===
Financial year 2013

Taxable income	Tax on this income	Effective tax rate
NT$0 – NT$272,000 [Includes Tax Free Threshold for below 70 of age (NT$85,000), Personal Standard Deduction (NT$79,000) and Payroll Income Deduction (NT$108,000)]	Nil	0%
NT$272,001 – NT$792,000	5% for each NT$1 for the next NT$520,000	0 – 3.28%
NT$792,001 – NT$1,442,000	NT$26,000 plus 12% for each NT$1 for the next NT$650,000	3.28 – 7.21%
NT$1,442,001 – NT$2,622,000	NT$104,000 plus 20% for each NT$1 for the next NT$1,180,000	7.21 – 12.97%
NT$2,622,001 – NT$4,672,000	NT$340,000 plus 30% for each NT$1 for the next NT$2,050,000	12.97 – 21.3%
NT$4,672,001 and over	NT$995,000 plus 40% for each exceeding NT$1	

== Tax brackets in the United States ==
=== 2025 tax brackets ===
Tax rate	Single Filers: Taxable income range	Married filing jointly: Taxable income range
10%	$0 – $11,925	$0 – $23,850
12%	$11,926 – $48,475	$23,851 – $96,950
22%	$48,476 – $103,350	$96,951 – $206,700
24%	$103,351 – $197,300	$206,701 – $394,600
32%	$197,301 – $250,525	$394,601 – $501,050
35%	$250,526 – $626,350	$501,051 – $751,600
37%	$626,351 and above	$751,601 and above

In the United States, the dollar amounts of the federal income tax standard deduction and personal exemptions for the taxpayer and dependents are adjusted annually to account for inflation. This results in yearly changes to the personal income tax brackets even when the federal income tax rates remain unchanged.

=== Internal Revenue Code terminology ===
Gross salary is the amount your employer pays an employee, plus one's income tax liability. Although the tax itself is included in this figure, it is typically the one used when discussing one's pay. For example, John gets paid $50/hour as an administrative director. His annual gross salary is $50/hour x 2,000 hours/year = $100,000/year. Of this, some is paid to John, and the rest to taxes.

W-2 wages are the wages that appear on the employee's W-2 issued by his employer each year in January. A copy of the W-2 is sent to the Internal Revenue Service (IRS). It is the gross salary less any contributions to pre-tax plans. The W-2 form also shows the amount withheld by the employer for federal income tax.

W-2 wages = gross salary less (contributions to employer retirement plan) less (contributions to employer health plan) less (contributions to some other employer plans)

Total income is the sum of all taxable income, including the W-2 wages. Almost all income is taxable. There are a few exemptions for individuals such as non-taxable interest on government bonds, a portion of the Social Security (SS) income (not the payments to SS, but the payments from SS to the individual), etc.

Adjusted gross income (AGI) is Total Income less some specific allowed deductions. Such as; alimony paid (income to the recipient), permitted moving expenses, self-employed retirement program, student loan interest, etc.

Itemized deductions are other specific deductions such as; mortgage interest on a home, state income taxes or sales taxes, local property taxes, charitable contributions, state income tax withheld, etc.

Standard deduction is a sort of minimum itemized deduction. If all itemized deductions are added up and it is less than the standard deduction, the standard deduction is taken. In 2007 this was $5,350 for those filing individually and $10,700 for married filing jointly.

Personal exemption is a tax exemption in which the taxpayer may deduct an amount from their gross income for each dependent they claim. It was $3,400 in 2007.

=== Sample tax calculation ===
Given the complexity of the United States' income tax code, individuals often find it necessary to consult a tax accountant or professional tax preparer. For example, John, a married 44-year-old who has two children, earned a gross salary of $100,000 in 2007. He contributes the maximum $15,500 per year to his employer's 401(k) retirement plan, pays $1,800 per year for his employer's family health plan, and $500 per year to his employer's Flexfund medical expense plan. All of the plans are allowed pre-tax contributions.

Gross pay = $100,000

W-2 wages = $100,000 – $15,500 – $1,800 – $500 = $82,200

John's and his wife's other income is $12,000 from John's wife's wages (she also got a W-2 but had no pre-tax contributions), $200 interest from a bank account, and a $150 state tax refund.

Total Income = $82,200 + $12,000 + $200 + $150 = $94,550.

John's employer reassigned John to a new office and his moving expenses were $8,000, of which $2,000 was not reimbursed by his employer.

Adjusted gross income = $94,550 – $2,000 = $92,550.

John's itemized deductions were $22,300 (mortgage interest, property taxes, and state income tax withheld).

John had four personal exemptions—himself, his wife and two children. His total personal exemptions were 4 x $3,400 = $13,600.

Taxable Income = $92,550 – $22,300 – $13,600 = $56,650.

The tax on the Taxable Income is found in a Tax Table if the Taxable Income is less than $100,000 and is computed if over $100,000. Both are used. The Tax Tables are in the 2007 1040 Instructions. The Tax Tables list income in $50 increments for all categories of taxpayers, single, married filing jointly, married filing separately, and head of household. For the Taxable Income range of "at least $56,650 but less than $56,700" the tax is $7,718 for a taxpayer who is married filing jointly.

The 2007 tax rates schedule for married filing jointly is:

If taxable income is over	but not over	then the tax is	of the amount over
$0	$15,650	10%	$0
$15,650	$63,700	$1,565.00 + 15%	$15,650
$63,700	$128,500	$8,772.50 + 25%	$63,700
$128,500	$195,850	$24,972.50 + 28%	$128,500
$195,850	$349,700	$43,830.50 + 33%	$195,850
$349,700		$94,601.00 + 35%	$349,700

The tax is 10% on the first $15,650 = $1,565.00

plus 15% of the amount over $15,650 ($56,650 – $15,650) = $41,000 x 15% = $6,150.00

Total ($1,565.00 + $6,150.00) = $7,715.00

In addition to the Federal income tax, John probably pays state income tax, Social Security tax, and Medicare tax. The Social Security tax in 2007 for John is 6.2% on the first $97,500 of earned income (wages), or a maximum of $6,045. There are no exclusions from earned income for Social Security so John pays the maximum of $6,045. His wife pays $12,000 x 6.2% = $744. Medicare is 1.45% on all earned income with no maximum. John and his wife pays $112,000 x 1.45% = $1,624 for Medicare in 2007.

Most states also levy income tax, exceptions being Alaska, Florida, Nevada, South Dakota, Texas, Washington, New Hampshire, Tennessee and Wyoming.

== Tax brackets Brazil ==
The current income tax bracket table for residents in Brazil, as of May 2025, under the monthly progressive scale for individual income tax (IRPF).

=== 2025 tax brackets ===
Monthly Taxable Income (BRL)	Marginal Tax Rate	Deduction (BRL)
Up to 2,428.80	0%	–
2,428.81 – 2,826.65	7.5%	142.80
2,826.66 – 3,751.05	15%	354.80
3,751.06 – 4,664.68	22.5%	636.13
Over 4,664.68	27.5%	869.36

Deductions: Deductions refer to the fixed amount that is subtracted from the taxable income at each tax rate tier to reduce your tax liability. These deductions are set by the government and are designed to decrease the effective tax burden on the individual.

Individuals may also be eligible for other deductions such as:

1. Dependents: Taxpayers may receive a deduction for each dependent they declare.
2. Health and education expenses: Expenses related to medical and educational services may be deductible within certain limits.
3. Retirement contributions: Contributions to pension plans may be deductible.
4. Charitable donations: Donations made to eligible organizations may also be deductible.

== Tax brackets Norway ==
The combined approximate marginal tax‑rates for individuals, including the ordinary income tax, the bracket tax on personal income, and the standard employee national insurance contribution.

=== 2025 tax brackets ===
Bracket step	Annual personal‑income range (NOK)	Bracket tax rate	Ordinary income tax rate	National Insurance (employee)	Approximate marginal rate
Step 0	Up to 217,400	0.0 %	22.0 %	7.7 %	~29.7 %
Step 1	217,401 – 306,050	1.7 %	22.0 %	7.7 %	~31.4 %
Step 2	306,051 – 697,150	4.0 %	22.0 %	7.7 %	~33.7 %
Step 3	697,151 – 942,400	13.7 %	22.0 %	7.7 %	~43.4 %
Step 4	942,401 – 1,410,750	16.7 %	22.0 %	7.7 %	~46.4 %
Step 5	Above 1,410,750	17.7 %	22.0 %	7.7 %	~47.4 %

== See also ==
- Income tax threshold
- Bracket creep
- Tax ladder
