= Filing status =

Tax status in the United States

Under United States federal income tax law, filing status is an important factor in computing taxable income. Filing status depends in part on marital status and family situation.

There are five possible filing status categories: single individual, married person filing jointly or surviving spouse, married person filing separately, head of household, and qualifying widow(er) with dependent children. A taxpayer who qualifies for more than one filing status may choose a status.

== Determining filing status ==
Generally, the marital status on the last day of the year determines the status for the entire year.

=== Single ===
Generally, if someone is unmarried, divorced, a registered domestic partner, or legally separated according to state law on December 31, that person must file as a single person for that year because the marital status at year-end applies for the entire tax year.

There are some exceptions, such as qualifying as a head of household or as a surviving spouse, that do not require one to file as a single taxpayer.

=== Married filing jointly ===
Marital status is decided based on a person's marital status on December 31. If a couple is married on December 31 of the taxable year, the couple may file a joint return for the year. However, even if the first day of legal separation or divorce from the spouse is December 31, one cannot file a joint return for any portion of that year. Certain married individuals, not legally separated or divorced, may still be considered single for purposes of filing tax returns if they are living apart.

A married couple is not required to file jointly. If one lived apart from one's spouse for the last six months of the year, one may also qualify for head of household status. If a spouse dies during the year, the surviving spouse may generally still file a joint return with the deceased spouse for that year because the taxpayer's marital status at the time of the spouse's death applies to the entire taxable year.

=== Married filing separately ===
Although the joint return often produces lower taxes, the opposite is sometimes the case. To accommodate for such circumstances, married couples may decide to file separately for a taxable year.

Married couples filing separately does not create an identical situation to the two parties filing as single. There are different brackets for unmarried taxpayers from the ones for married taxpayers who file separately. Unmarried taxpayers enjoy wider tax brackets and so pay less tax on the same amount of income.

Certain taxpayers, who would otherwise be considered married but file separately, maintain a household for a child and have a spouse not a member of the household for the last six months of the taxable year shall be considered unmarried.

=== Head of household ===
To qualify for the head of household filing status, one must be unmarried and pay more than half the cost of maintaining a home for oneself and another relative who lives with that person for over half the year and can be claimed as the dependent. A "dependent" for these purpose includes grandchild and step-grandchildren, not just children and stepchildren.

Filing as a head of household can have substantial financial benefits over filing as a single status taxpayer. As a head of household, one may obtain a more generous tax brackets and larger standard deductions.

There are many special rules and exceptions applicable to head of household filing status.

=== Qualifying widow(er) with dependent child ===
Certain taxpayers, who maintain their homes as principal residences of qualifying dependents and whose spouses died during either of the last two preceding taxable years, may be considered surviving spouses as long as they have not remarried. If the two-year time period has run out following the spouse's death, one may still qualify for head of household status.

There are many special rules and exceptions that apply to the surviving spouse filing status.

== Importance of choosing correct status ==
An individual's tax liability depends upon two variables: the individual's filing status and the taxable income. The status can determine the correct amount of tax, whether the taxpayer can take certain tax deductions or exemptions that could lower the final tax bill, and even whether one must file a return at all. One must file the status honestly, or it will be considered fraudulent and penalties may be assessed.

== See also ==
- Rate schedule (federal income tax)
