= Income tax threshold =

Income level at which a person begins paying income taxes

The income tax threshold is the income level at which a person begins paying income taxes. The income tax threshold equates to the:

- Personal allowance in the UK, which is £ 12,500 for 2019/20.
- Basic allowance in Germany, which is € 9,408 in 2020.
- Basic Marginal tax bracket (Grenzsteuersatz) in Austria, which is € 0 – € 13.308 in 2025.
- Income tax threshold in France, which was € 6,088 in 2012.
- The standard deduction in the US, which was $ 12,000 in 2018 for a single person.
- Basic personal amount in Canada, which was C$ 11,809 in 2018.
- Tax-free threshold in Brazil, which was R$ 33,888 in 2025.
- Tax-free threshold in Australia, which was A$ 18,200 in 2023–24.
- Tax-free threshold in Greece, which was € 9,545 in 2016.
- Tax-free threshold in Poland was 30,000 PLN in 2022.

== See also ==
- Basic income guarantee
- Tax bracket
- Taxable income
- Tax exemption
