= Taxability =

Taxability may refer to the eligibility of a person or entity for taxation:

- Taxable estate (Russian Empire)
- Taxable REIT subsidiaries

It may also refer to the base upon which a tax system imposes a tax:

- Taxable income

- Taxable wages
- Taxable profit

- Taxable estate under an estate tax regime
- Taxable real-estate under a property tax regime
- Taxable goods and services under a sales tax regime
- Taxable transactions under a transfer tax regime
