= Proportional tax =

Fixed fraction of source

A proportional tax is a tax imposed so that the tax rate is fixed, with no change as the taxable base amount increases or decreases. The amount of the tax is in proportion to the amount subject to taxation. "Proportional" describes a distribution effect on income or expenditure, referring to the way the rate remains consistent (does not progress from "low to high" or "high to low" as income or consumption changes), where the marginal tax rate is equal to the average tax rate.

It can be applied to individual taxes or to a tax system as a whole; a year, multi-year, or lifetime. Proportional taxes maintain equal tax incidence regardless of the ability-to-pay and do not shift the incidence disproportionately to those with a higher or lower economic well-being.

Although a proportional tax is sometimes called a flat tax, flat taxes are in fact only one type of proportional tax that offer particular deductions. Therefore, they fall under the same category as proportional taxes. Flat taxes are defined as levying a fixed (“flat”) fraction of taxable income. A flat tax is a tax with a single rate on the taxable amount, after accounting for any deductions or exemptions from the tax base. It is not necessarily a fully-proportional tax. They usually exempt from taxation household income below a statutorily determined level that is a function of the type and size of the household. As a result, such a flat marginal rate is consistent with a progressive average tax rate.

A progressive tax is a tax in which the tax rate increases as the taxable base amount increases. The term “progressive” describes a distribution effect on income or expenditure, referring to the way the rate progresses from low to high, where the average tax rate is less than the marginal tax rate. The opposite of a progressive tax is a regressive tax, where the tax rate decreases as the amount subject to taxation increases. Because there is an inverse relationship between the tax rate and the taxpayer's ability to pay as determined by assets, consumption, or income, regressive taxes place a greater burden (relative to resources) on the poor than on the rich in terms of individual income and wealth.

The French Declaration of the Rights of Man and of the Citizen of 1789 proclaims:

A common contribution is essential for the maintenance of the public forces and for the cost of administration. This should be equitably distributed among all the citizens in proportion to their means.

== Arguments for and against ==
Proponents of a proportionate tax system claim that since there is no tax penalty linked to higher salaries, people are encouraged to earn more. There is no concern about moving into a higher tax bracket when income rises because the tax rate stays the same. This stimulates investment and production, which supports economic growth and simplicity.

On the opposing hand, not everyone supports proportionate taxes. According to critics, low-wage workers are disproportionately affected as they wind up paying a larger percentage of their income in taxes. They contend that a progressive tax system is a more equitable solution, in which higher-income individuals pay a larger proportion of taxes. The fact that flat taxes have the potential to worsen income inequality is one of their main objections. Some nations that use proportional taxation to remedy this problem do so by introducing deductions and exemptions for low-income people, thereby making the system less regressive.

Progressive tax rates or marginal taxation, which is more common worldwide, is a tax structure in place in developed countries, where those with lower incomes pay a smaller share of taxes.

== Proportional rates ==
Proportional taxes on consumption are considered by some to be regressive; that is, low-income people tend to spend a greater percentage of their income in taxable sales (using a cross section timeframe) than higher income people. A regressive tax is when the average tax rate is lower, with higher income. So income and average tax rate have an inverse relationship. However, this calculation is derived when the tax paid is divided not by the tax base (the amount spent) but by income, which is argued to create an arbitrary relationship. The income tax rate itself is proportional, with people with higher incomes paying more tax but at the same rate.

If a consumption tax is to be related to income, the unspent income can be treated as tax-deferred (spending savings at a later point in time), at which time it is taxed creating a proportional rate using an income base.

== Examples ==
Proportional taxes are one of several types of taxes that governments can use to generate revenue. But these examples can be also considered regressive or progressive in different countries. They often exempt items or individuals from taxes to alleviate the burden on the poor.

=== Income tax ===
- Eleven U.S. states impose a proportional income rate tax (also referred to as flat tax) for individuals. These states are as of 2023: Arizona, Colorado, Idaho, Illinois, Indiana, Kentucky, Michigan, Mississippi, North Carolina, Pennsylvania, and Utah
- Estonia’s flat tax - Estonia employs a proportional tax rate on personal income, corporate income, and consumption. This system has garnered international attention for its simplicity. Individuals pay a flat rate of 20% on their income, which includes wages, business profits, and capital gains. Additionally, Estonia applies a 20% value-added tax (VAT) to most goods and services.

Several countries that have flat taxes include Greenland, which has one of the highest rates in the world (45%). However, Greenland is deficient in many social services when compared to many developed countries. Mongolia, Kazakhstan (10%), Bolivia (13%), as well as other countries, have comparable flat tax rates.

=== Occupational tax ===
An occupational tax is a form of excise tax that is imposed upon persons or business entities for engaging in a profession, trade, or business. Some jurisdictions class business and occupation taxes according to sectors, such as wholesaling, services, retailing, or manufacturing. Within each sector, the tax rate is the same. However, it may vary among classes. Occupational taxes maintain a consistent rate for everyone in a specific occupation or industry, so they are considered proportional.

=== Property tax ===
In a property tax system, taxes are imposed in proportion to each property's monetary value, which is determined by the government through appraisal or other means, so Property tax can be considered a proportional tax in some cases. However property tax rates can vary in countries significantly based on factors such as the property’s location, value, and local regulations. Thats why property taxes are often considered regressive - they take a larger percentage of income from low-income earners.

=== Historical examples ===
- Ancient Egypt

the pharaohs established a tax system that exemplified proportional taxation. Individuals contributed a percentage of their income to the government. These taxes were collected in the form of crops and livestock, which served as essential resources for feeding the army and funding public infrastructure projects1. This historical practice reflects an early instance of proportional taxation

- The Roman Empire

Taxation in ancient Rome demonstrated a proportional tax, where citizens were required to contribute 10% of their income to the government. The tithe was one significant element of this system, they were collected to fund essential endeavors, including maintaining the army and supporting public infrastructure projects like roads, aqueducts, and public buildings.

== See also ==
- Deadweight loss
- Equity (economics)
- Flat tax
- Laffer curve
- Land value tax
- Optimal tax
- Progressive tax
- Proportional rule (bankruptcy)
- Regressive tax
- Robin Hood effect
- Suits index
- Tax incidence
- Regressive tax
