= Head of household =

Filing status for individual United States taxpayers

In the United States, head of household is a filing status for individual United States taxpayers. It provides preferential tax rates and a larger standard deduction for single people caring for qualifying dependents.

To use the head of household filing status, a taxpayer must:

- Be unmarried or considered unmarried at the end of the year
- Have paid more than half the cost of keeping up a home for the tax year (either one's own home or the home of a qualifying parent)
- Usually have a qualifying person who lived with the head in the home for more than half of the tax year unless the qualifying person is a dependent parent

Advocates of the head of household filing status argue that it is an important financial benefit to single parents, and particularly single mothers, who have reduced tax burdens as a result of the status. Critics, however, argue that it is poorly targeted, delivering larger benefits to those with high incomes and smaller benefits to those with low incomes; and point out that it creates marriage penalties and adds additional complexity to the tax code.

== Overview ==
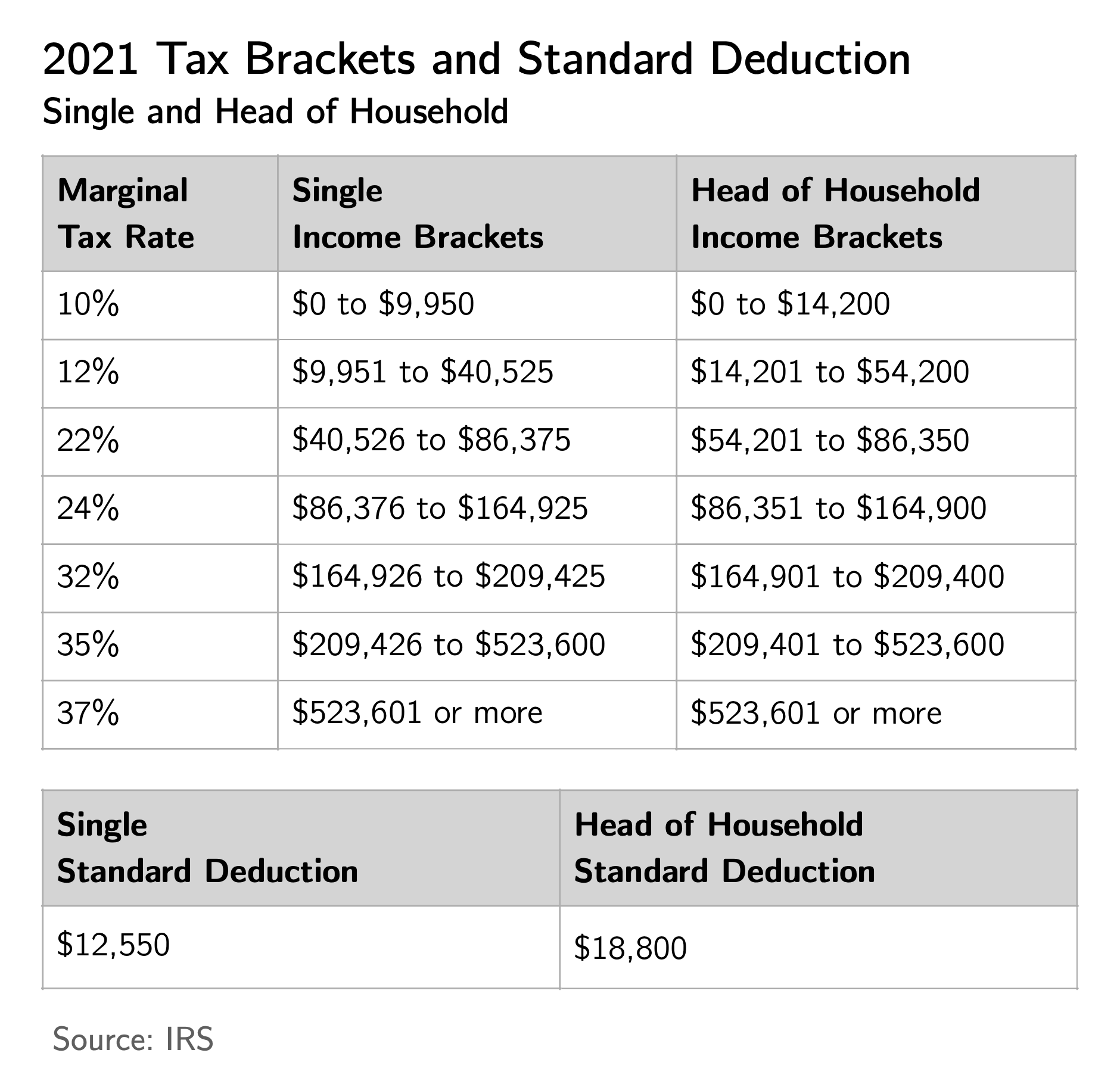
Table of 2021 marginal tax rates for single filers and heads of households

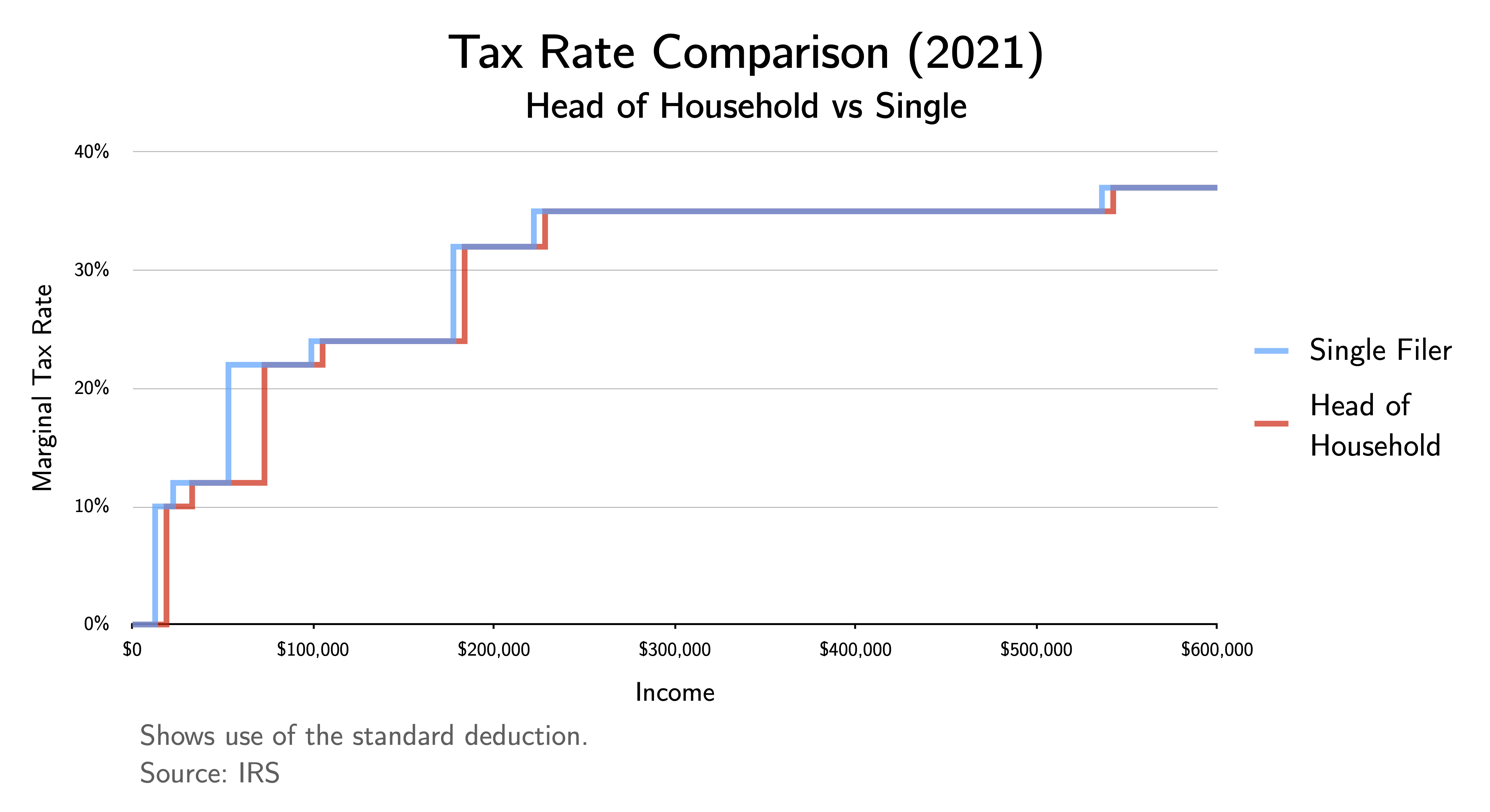
Chart of 2021 marginal tax rates for single filers and for heads of households, with use of the standard deduction

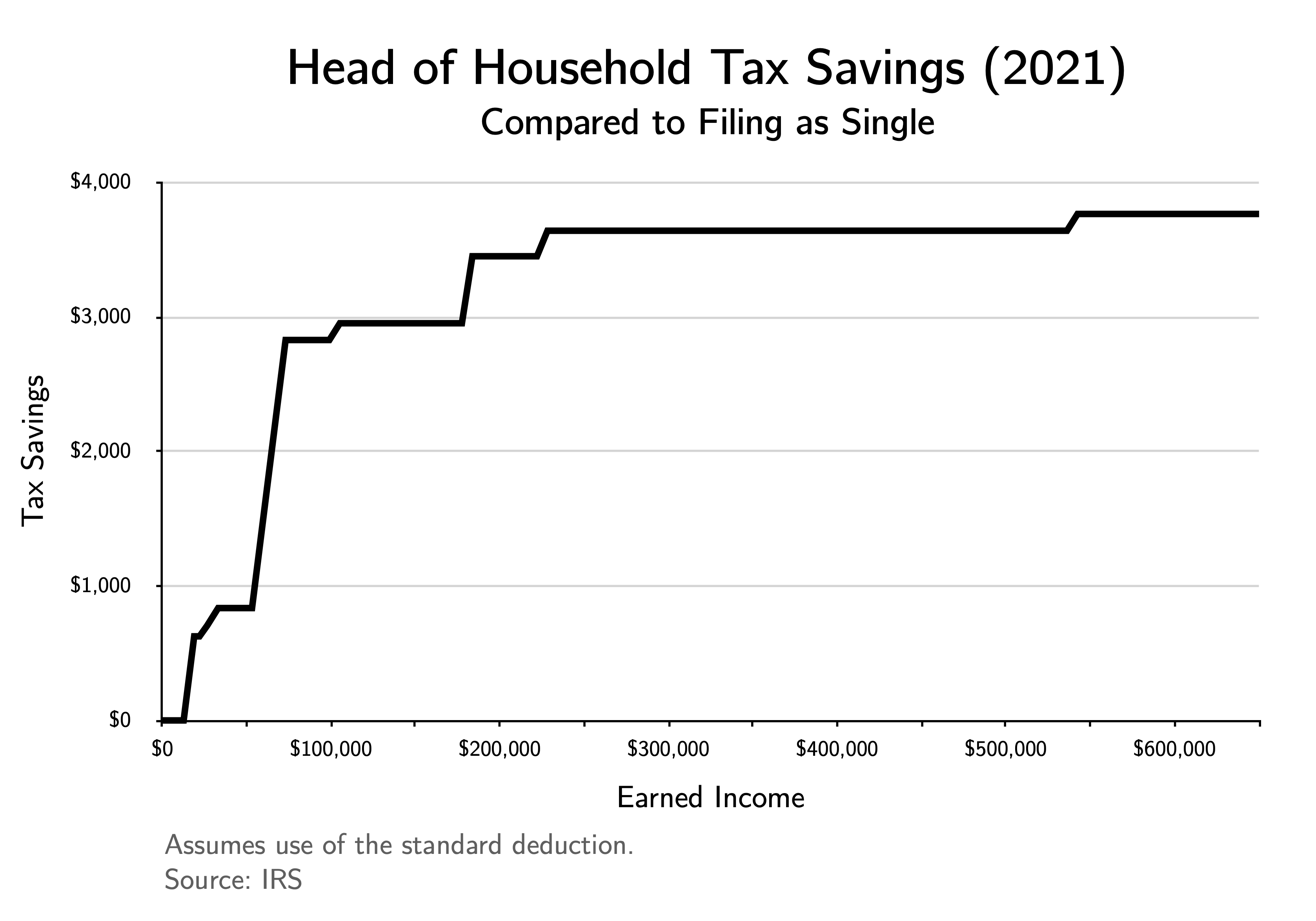
2021 tax savings by income from filing as head of household rather than as a single filer, using the standard deduction

The head of household filing status was created in 1951 to acknowledge the additional financial burdens faced by single people caring for dependents. Consequently, it provides single parents and other people caring for qualifying dependents with a larger standard deduction and preferential tax rates compared to single filers, reducing their tax liabilities (see chart). In 2021, for instance, heads of households were entitled to an $18,800 standard deduction, compared to $12,550 for single filers.

In 2015, according to the Census Population Survey, 76% of head of household filers were women.

== Eligibility ==
There are three basic eligibility criteria for the head of household filing status:

- The taxpayer must be unmarried or considered unmarried
- A qualifying person must have lived with the taxpayer for more than half of the year, with some exceptions and special rules
- The taxpayer must have paid at least half of the costs of keeping up a home for the year

These are explained in greater detail below.

=== Unmarried or considered unmarried ===
To be eligible for the head of household filing status, a taxpayer must be unmarried or "considered unmarried". A person is unmarried as long as they are not legally married on the last day of the tax year. People who were legally married on the last day of the tax year can still be eligible for the head of household filing status if they satisfy several requirements that enable them to be "considered unmarried". To be considered unmarried, all of the following conditions must be met:

- The taxpayer must file a separate return from their spouse.
- The taxpayer must have paid more than half the cost of keeping up the home for the tax year.
- The taxpayer's spouse must not have lived in the home at any time during the last six months of the year.
- The taxpayer's home was the main home of his or her child, stepchild, or foster child for more than half the year.
- The taxpayer must be able to claim an exemption for the child. However, this test is still met if the only reason that the taxpayer cannot claim the child's exemption is that the noncustodial parent is claiming the exemption (under a written release of exemption or a pre-1985 decree of divorce, decree of separate maintenance, or written separation agreement).

A taxpayer may also be considered unmarried for head of household purposes if their spouse is a nonresident alien and the taxpayer does not elect to treat the spouse as a resident alien. In that case, the taxpayer can file as a head of household while still being considered married for purposes of the earned income tax credit.

=== Qualifying person ===
To file as a head of household, a qualifying person must have lived with the taxpayer for at least half of the year, excluding certain temporary absences (there are also special rules for dependent parents, see Special rule for parents). The following table determines who is a qualifying person for head of household filing status:

If the person is a...	and...	then that person is...
Qualifying child (1)	is single	a qualifying person, whether or not one can claim an exemption for that person
Qualifying child (1)	is married and the taxpayer can claim an exemption for that person	a qualifying person
Qualifying child (1)	is married and the taxpayer cannot claim an exemption for that person	not a qualifying person
Qualifying relative who is a father or mother	the taxpayer can claim an exemption for that person	a qualifying person
Qualifying relative who is a father or mother	the taxpayer cannot claim an exemption for that person	not a qualifying person
Qualifying relative other than a father or mother	that person lived with the taxpayer for more than half the year and is related in one of the ways listed below, and the taxpayer can claim an exemption for that person	a qualifying person.
Qualifying relative other than a father or mother	did not live with taxpayer for more than half the year	not a qualifying person
Qualifying relative other than a father or mother	is not related in one of the ways listed below and is a qualifying relative only because he or she lived with the taxpayer for the whole year as a member of the household	not a qualifying person
Qualifying relative other than a father or mother	the taxpayer cannot claim an exemption for that person	not a qualifying person

(1) Qualifying Child must meet all the tests. For example, a 25-year-old full-time student does not qualify as a child but may qualify as a qualifying relative if the tests are met. See Table 5 Pub 501 (2012). In this case filing as HOH could not be done. If the tests are met then filing as single or married filing separately could be done and a claim for an exemption for the non qualified child.

==== Qualifying relatives ====
Other than a father or mother, the following types of relationships may qualify a dependent as a qualifying person for head of household purposes:

- Child, stepchild, foster child, or a descendant of any of them. (A legally adopted child is considered a child.)
- Brother, sister, half-brother, half-sister, stepbrother, stepsister
- Grandparent or direct ancestor but not foster parent
- Stepfather or stepmother
- Son or daughter of the taxpayer's brother or sister
- Brother or sister of the taxpayer's father or mother
- Son-in-law, daughter-in-law, father-in-law, mother-in-law, brother-in-law, or sister-in-law

Any of these relationships that was established by marriage is not ended by death or divorce.

==== Special rule for parents ====
If the qualifying person is the taxpayer's father or mother, the taxpayer may file as head of household even if the father or mother does not live with the taxpayer. However, the taxpayer must be able to claim the exemption for the father or mother. Also, the taxpayer must pay more than half the cost of keeping up a home that was the main home for the entire year for the father or mother. The taxpayer is considered keeping up the father or mother's main home by paying more than half the cost of keeping the parent in a rest home for the elderly.

=== Keeping up a home ===
To qualify for head of household filing status, the taxpayer must have paid more than half the cost of keeping up a home for the year. Costs can include property taxes, mortgage interest, rent, utilities, repairs and maintenance, insurance, and food eaten in the home. Costs such as education, clothing, vacation, and transportation are not included in the cost of keeping up the home.

== History ==
The head of household status was created in 1951 by Congress through the Revenue Act of 1951. It was created to provide tax relief to single-parent households, who previously faced the same tax rates as single people without children despite the additional financial obligations inherent in raising children. It did this, in effect, by extending a "portion of the tax benefits that two-parent families received under the marital income splitting regime adopted nationally in 1948".

== Criticism ==
The head of household status has been criticized for being a poorly targeted way to deliver financial assistance to single parents as the size of the benefit is smallest for those with the lowest incomes and the largest for those with the highest incomes:

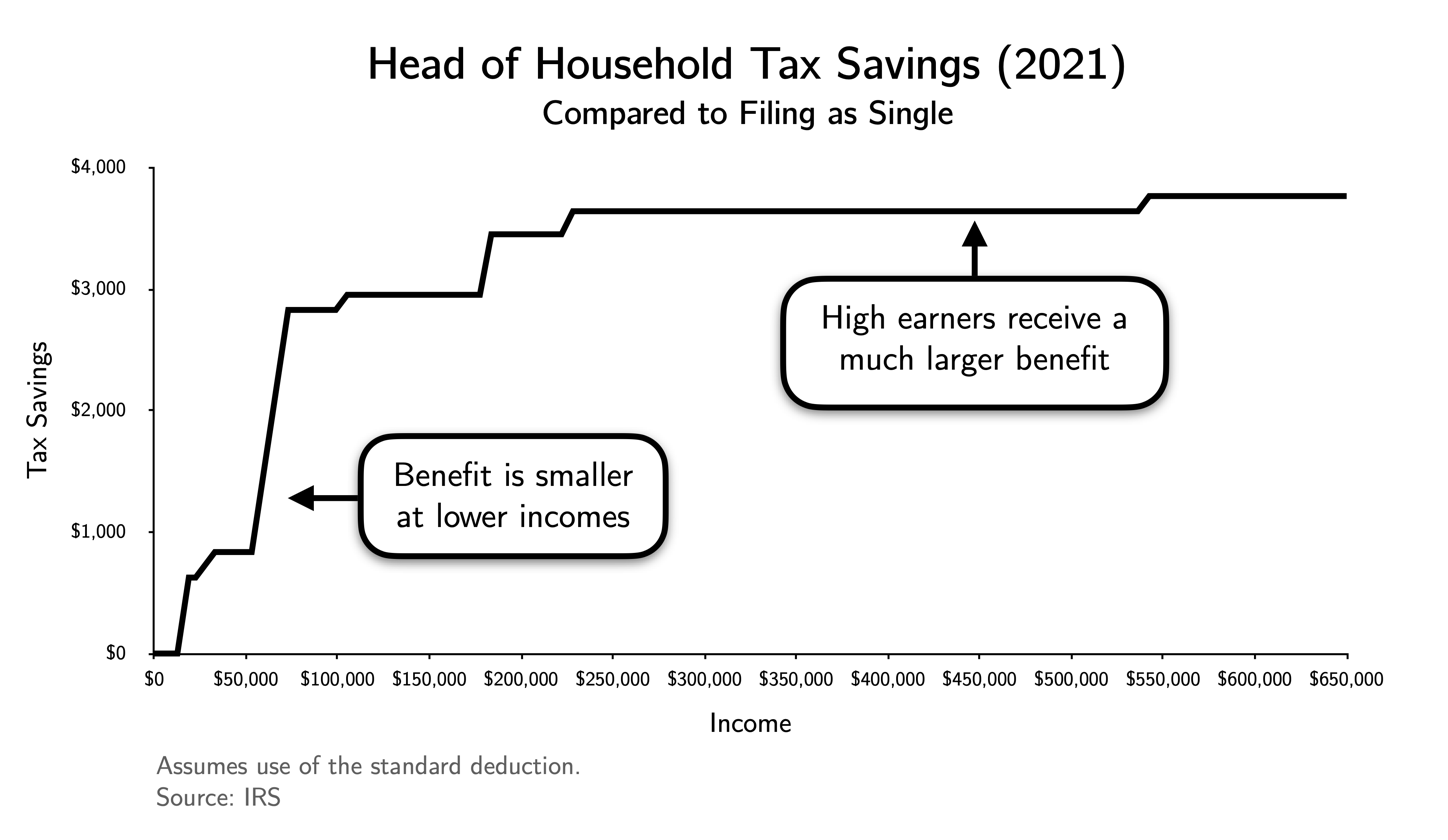

In 2021, for instance, a single parent with one child whose income was below the poverty line and who used the standard deduction would have received a benefit that is at least 6 times smaller than the benefit that a very high earner who used the standard deduction would have received. (Note: In 2021, a single parent with one child who uses the standard deduction and has a pre-tax income of $18,677 (the Census Bureau's poverty threshold for a household with a parent under 65 and a child under 18) saves $613 by filing as a head of household rather than a single filer. A single parent who uses the standard deduction and has a pre-tax income over $542,400, by contrast, would save $3,764.50. As income decreases further below the poverty line, the percent difference between two grows further.) Several political commentators and politicians, from both the political left and right, have proposed eliminating the head of household status—which would save the federal government roughly $16 billion per year (Note: Savings can fluctuate modestly from year to year, and will tend to grow in the long run as economic growth and inflation increase federal tax receipts. $16 billion is a rounded yearly average based on savings projected by the Joint Committee on Taxation for the years 2021 to 2030.)—and use the savings to fund increased child benefits that benefit low and middle-income families equally or more than wealthy families. Senator Mitt Romney, for instance, proposed in his "Family Security Act" to use the savings from eliminating the head of household status to partially fund a child allowance (which would replace the existing child tax credit) that provides $250 monthly per child ages 6–17 and $350 monthly per child ages 0–5 for all families with incomes below $200,000 if single and $400,000 if married. (Note: He later released a modified plan, the "Family Security Act 2.0", that included a phase-in affecting families with incomes below $10,000.)

It has also been criticized for creating marriage penalties, for not accounting for the costs of having more than one child, and for creating additional complexity in the tax code.
