= U.S. tax brackets =

U.S. tax brackets may refer to:

- Income tax in the United States
- Tax rate schedules
