= Regressive tax =

Higher tax ratio on poorer sources

A regressive tax is a tax imposed in such a manner that the tax rate decreases as the amount subject to taxation increases. "Regressive" describes a distribution effect on income or expenditure, referring to the way the rate progresses from high to low, so that the average tax rate exceeds the marginal tax rate.

The regressivity of a particular tax can also factor the propensity of the taxpayers to engage in the taxed activity relative to their resources (the demographics of the tax base). In other words, if the activity being taxed is more likely to be carried out by the poor and less likely to be carried out by the rich, the tax may be considered regressive. To measure the effect, the income elasticity of the good being taxed as well as the income effect on consumption must be considered. The measure can be applied to individual taxes or to a tax system as a whole; a year, multi-year, or lifetime.

== Examples ==
=== Poll taxes ===
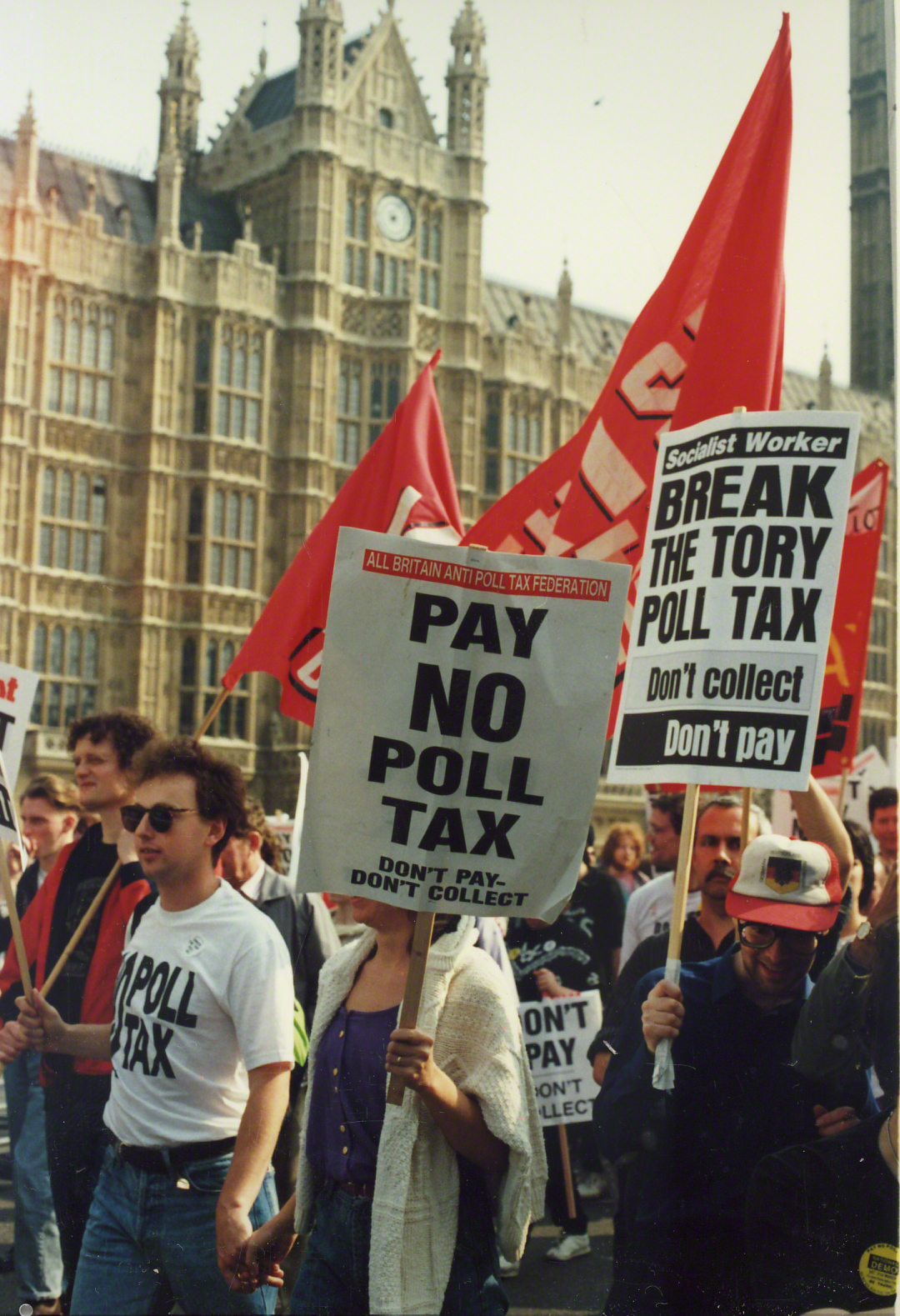
Anti-poll tax protesters gathering shortly before the riot began, March 31st 1990

A poll tax is a fixed sum levied on all individuals regardless of their economic circumstance. By the late 20th century most major economies severed the practice (e.g., Twenty-fourth Amendment; Council Tax).

Perhaps the most notable example of the public's dissatisfaction with poll taxes is the Community Charge implemented by Margaret Thatcher. The handling of the tax system transmission and the aftermath of inept government intervention became subject to mass criticism. Negative impacts of the poll tax disproportionally fell on lower income groups; whilst an effective government would have provided extensive welfare programs and adjusted national tax systems to aid those groups, the British government failed to provide any protection and only succeeded in antagonizing the beneficiaries of the reform.

The failure to gain public support only stagnated the already troublesome administrative burden. The result were riots and wide-spread noncompliance which rendered the tax uncollectable. Coupled with mismanagement of government injections and low tax revenue, the situation snowballed and endangered local autonomy which thus further fueled civic unrest. This stresses the importance of establishing tax systems which enjoy the wide support of the public and are simple to administer. The Community Charge was later scrapped and replaced under John Major's cabinet.

=== Lump-sum tax ===
A lump-sum tax is a fixed tax imposed on individuals or businesses. It doesn’t vary based on income or wealth. This means that all taxpayers are required to pay the same fixed amount, regardless of their financial status.

The lump-sum tax has fallen from mainstream practice, with only one country, Switzerland, still adhering to it. However, this trend is still challenged by some economists who believe in its efficiency due to factors like the simplicity of administration or lower tax evasion rates.

Recent studies suggest utilizing modified lump-sum tax as a form of a wealth tax. This is derived from the belief that wealth can be based upon estimated consumption of the individual, thus the tax indirectly targets the presumably higher level of expenditure of wealthy individuals. It shifts the tax burden to people with a higher marginal propensity to consume. In this case, it assumed to be non-mandatory and one-time.

=== A tax with a cap ===
A tax with a cap is one wherein, above a certain level, no taxes are paid. An example is the American Social Security Tax, which does not apply to wages over an annual limit.

=== Sin taxes ===
Sin taxes (pigouvian taxes) are levies imposed on goods and activities deemed harmful to individuals or society (common examples are tobacco, alcohol, and gambling). Regressivity in sin taxes stems from their disproportionate impact on lower-income households, who tend to allocate a larger share of their income to sin goods compared to wealthier individuals. Such taxes are often imposed at a uniform rate so they will make up a greater proportion of the final price of cheaper brands, compared to the higher-quality products generally consumed by the wealthy. For example, "people in the bottom income quintile spend a 78% larger share of their income on alcohol taxes than people in the top quintile." Tobacco in particular is highly regressive, with the bottom quintile of income paying an effective rate 583% higher than that of the top quintile. Just 10% of households account for 80% of sin tax revenue in the USA.

=== Allowance reduction ===
An allowance reduction in an income tax system allows for an individual's personal allowance to be withdrawn, making a higher marginal tax for a limited band before returning to the underlying rate. In the UK, there is an effective 60% band at £100,000, which returns to 40% at £120,000.

=== Excise taxation ===
Non-uniform excise taxation based on everyday essentials like food (fat tax, salt tax), transport (fuel tax, fare hikes for public transport, mobility pricing), energy (carbon tax) and housing (council tax, window tax) is frequently regressive on income. The income elasticity of demand of food, for example, is usually less than 1 (inelastic) (see Engel's law) and therefore as a household's income rises, the tax collected on the food remains almost the same. Therefore, as a proportion of available expenditure, the relative tax burden falls more heavily on households with lower incomes. Some governments offer rebates to households with lower incomes, ostensibly in an effort to mitigate the regressive nature of these taxes.

A related concept exists where production and importation of essential goods are strictly controlled, such as milk, eggs, cheese and poultry under Canada's supply management system, the result being that the products will sell for a higher price than they would under a free market system. The difference in price is often criticized for being a "regressive tax" even though such products are generally not taxed directly.

=== Payroll taxes ===
Payroll taxes, such as FICA and Unemployment Insurance in the United States, and consumption taxes such as value-added tax and sales taxes are regressive in that they both raise prices of purchased goods. Lower-income earners save and invest less money, so pay a larger proportion of their income toward these taxes, directly for sales tax and as the price increase required to make revenue covering payrolls for payroll taxes.

=== Tariffs ===
Tariffs are a tax imposed on imported goods from another country. Their main purpose, besides increasing revenue, is to protect domestic industries, since governments can use tariffs to benefit particular industries, often doing so to protect companies and jobs. For example, a tariff might be imposed on an imported good that competes with a domestically-produced good, making the imported good more expensive and thus less attractive to consumers. In cases where lower-income people spend a higher proportion of their earnings on goods subject to tariffs, the tariffs can be considered regressive. As an example, a 2018 analysis of tariffs in the first Trump administration by the Centre for Economic Policy Research found that tariffs disproportionately affected poor Americans, single parents, and women.

=== Other forms of regressive taxes ===
- Property tax in regard to automobiles, better known as the "car tax" in some jurisdictions.
- Lotteries have been described as a disguised regressive tax.

== Comparing progressive and regressive taxation ==
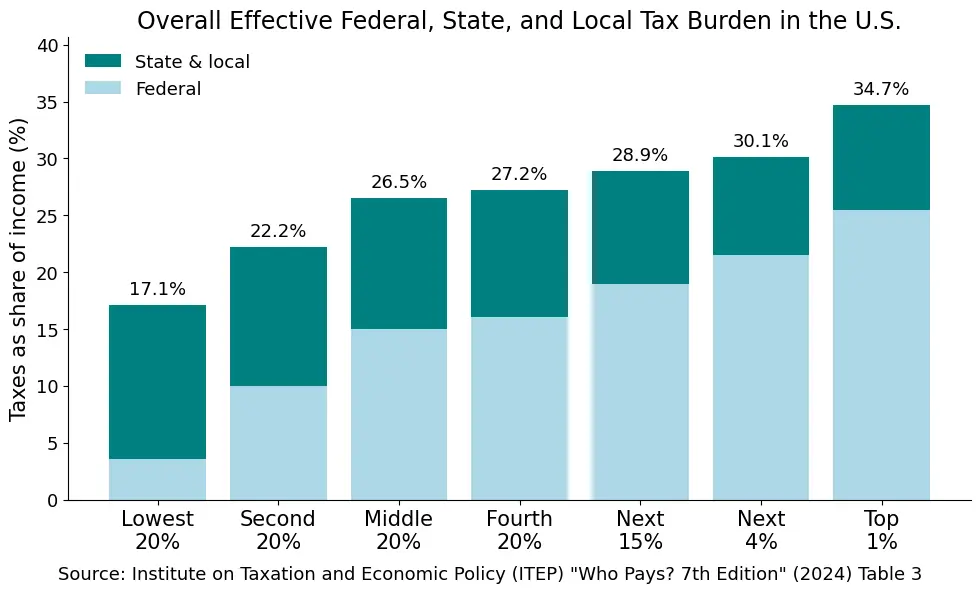
Overall tax burden in the US in 2024

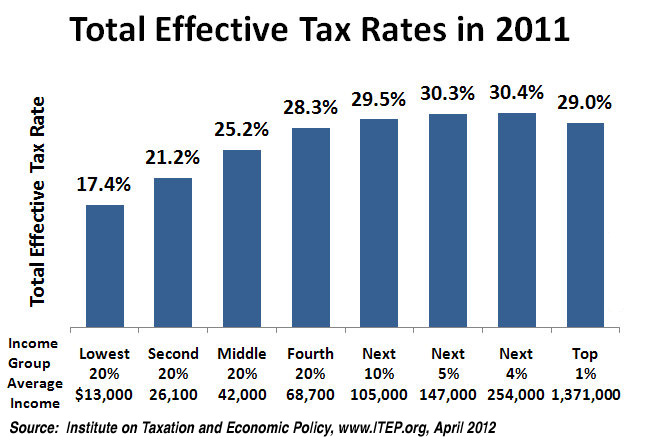
Overall tax burden in the US in 2011

A progressive tax is a type of tax where the tax rate increases as the taxable amount or income increases. This means that individuals or entities with higher incomes pay a higher percentage of their income in taxes. On the contrary, a regressive tax is a tax system where the tax rate decreases as the taxable amount increases. This implies that as the value of the asset purchased or owned by the taxpayer increases, the tax rate applied decreases.

In a progressive tax system, the tax is levied on income or profit based on a rate schedule that increases as income or profit increases. This is in stark contrast to a regressive tax system, where the tax is charged as a percentage of the asset purchased or owned by the taxpayer, regardless of their income or ability to pay.

One of the key features of a progressive tax system is that it takes into account the taxpayer’s ability to pay. This means that higher-income individuals or entities are taxed at a higher rate because they have a greater ability to pay the tax. In contrast, in a regressive tax system, the level of income of the taxpayer is not considered. This means that the tax is applied equally to all taxpayers, regardless of their income level.

Progressive tax systems typically include all forms of direct taxes, which are taxes that are paid directly to the government by the individual or entity on whom it is imposed. On the other hand, regressive tax systems usually encompass all forms of indirect taxes, which are taxes that are collected by an intermediary (such as a retail store) from the person who bears the ultimate economic burden of the tax (such as the consumer).

In a progressive tax system, the marginal tax rate (the tax rate on the last dollar of income earned) is greater than the average tax rate (the total tax paid divided by total income earned). Conversely, in a regressive tax system, the marginal tax rate is lower than the average tax rate.

== Measurement ==
One common way to measure tax progressivity is by looking at the percentage change in after-tax income. This method assumes that a household’s economic wellbeing, or welfare, is closely linked to its after-tax income. Therefore, a tax cut that increases everyone’s after-tax income by the same percentage leaves the relative distribution of after-tax income unchanged. If a tax cut increases after-tax income proportionately more for lower-income taxpayers than for higher-income taxpayers, it will make the tax system more progressive (or less regressive). Conversely, a tax cut that increases after-tax income proportionately more for higher-income taxpayers than for lower-income taxpayers will make the tax system less progressive (or more regressive).

However, this method has its limitations. For instance, it does not take into account the fact that the burden of paying a certain amount of tax is much greater on a household with a lower income than it is on a household with a higher income. Therefore, some analysts believe that other measures, such as the share of the tax cut received, and the size of the tax cut in both absolute dollars and as a percentage of initial tax liability, are more accurate representations of the distribution of tax burdens.

Another approach to measuring tax progressivity is by looking at the redistributive effect of taxes and transfers. This method involves measuring the difference in the Gini coefficient of incomes before and after taxes and transfers. The Gini coefficient is a measure of inequality, with 0 representing perfect equality and 1 representing perfect inequality. Therefore, a decrease in the Gini coefficient after taxes and transfers would indicate that the tax system is progressive.

In low-income countries, a detailed analysis of progressivity requires a welfare ranking of individuals or households, and for tax liabilities of each individual or household to be ascertained. This method takes into account the broader concept of redistribution, which includes not only taxes but also transfers and other forms of government intervention.

== Implementations ==
Examining real-world examples of regressive taxation offers valuable insights into its impact on different societies and the efficacy of various policy responses. In 2005, the Swiss canton of Obwalden implemented a regressive taxation system. It was struck down by the Federal Supreme Court of Switzerland in 2007, because it ran counter to the Swiss Federal Constitution.

Regressive taxes are implemented in the United States primarily through sales taxes, excise taxes, and payroll taxes. Sales taxes are imposed by state and local governments on goods and services, impacting lower-income individuals more as they spend a larger portion of their income on necessities subject to these taxes. Excise taxes, such as those on gasoline, tobacco, and alcohol, also tend to affect lower-income households disproportionately because they consume a higher percentage of their income on these taxed items. Additionally, the Social Security payroll tax is regressive up to a certain income threshold, as it applies to all workers but only taxes a portion of their earnings, exempting higher-income earners beyond that threshold. These regressive tax mechanisms exacerbates inequality since lower-income individuals are paying a larger share of their income in taxes compared to higher-income individuals. Tax cuts for the wealthy under the Trump administration further tilted the scales in favor of the rich, contributing to income inequality concerns in the U.S.

Brazil uses a regressive tax system. Those who earn up to twice the minimum wage spend 48.8% of their income on taxes, while the families with income higher than 30 times the minimum wage pay only 26.3% of their income on taxes. Brazil has a huge gap between the poor and the rich. Regressive taxation only widens this gap. This is the reason why the inequality in Brazil is as high as it is.

== Arguments for regressive taxation ==
- Funding public goods: Regressive taxes can be an effective way to fund public goods and services. A sales tax can help fund public infrastructure, education, and healthcare.
- Healthier society: Sin taxes promote healthy behavior. The taxes can be used to discourage unhealthy behaviors. They can help reduce consumption of harmful products (cigarettes, alcohol or soda to name a few). Studies show that increased price is very effective way of incentivising smokers to quit smoking.
- Economic growth: Some economists argue that lowering taxes on high-income earners encourages entrepreneurship, investment, and job creation, thereby benefiting the overall economy, this can potentially stimulate economic activity.
- Simplicity: Regressive tax system is easier to administer and enforce than a progressive one. This is because a regressive tax system has a flat tax rate for all income levels, requiring fewer resources to implement and enforce.
- Efficiency: Regressive taxes are non-distortionary. They do not discourage people from working or investing, unlike progressive income taxes.
- Balancing other taxes: Regressive taxes can help balance the tax system, since some parts of it are highly progressive (for example income tax). Thus introducing regressive taxes can help reduce the overall progressivity of the tax system.

== Arguments against regressive taxation ==
- Economic inequality: This is arguably the main argument against regressive taxes. At the individual level, regressive taxes disproportionately burden low-income households, consuming a larger share of their disposable income. This can perpetuate cycles of poverty and hinder upward mobility, as struggling families are forced to allocate more resources towards basic necessities rather than savings or investments.
- Increased financial stress: Regressive taxes can lead to increased financial stress for low-income individuals and families. If a large portion of an individual’s income goes towards paying taxes, they may struggle to afford basic necessities such as food, housing, and healthcare.
- Decreased productivity of workers: Heavily taxed individuals may be discouraged to work hard or they may choose to work less (or to not work at all).
- Less consumer spending: People would spend less money because of higher tax burden. Lower purchasing power of consumers may lead to a failure of some businesses.

== See also ==
- Lump-sum tax
- Progressive tax
- Proportional tax
- Tax incidence
- Laffer curve
- Suits index
- Ghetto tax
- Progressivity in United States income tax
