= Rate schedule (federal income tax) =

Chart used in US tax caculations

A rate schedule or rate table is a chart that helps United States taxpayers determine their federal income tax for a particular year.

== Origin ==
The origin of the current rate schedules is the Internal Revenue Code of 1986 (IRC), which is separately published as Title 26 of the United States Code. With that law, the U.S. Congress created four types of rate tables, all of which are based on a taxpayer's filing status (e.g., "married individuals filing joint returns," "heads of households").

Each year the United States Internal Revenue Service (IRS) updates rate schedules in accordance with guidelines that Congress established in the IRC. In general, the IRS bases such adjustments on inflation and cost of living increases in the previous year.

== Application ==
The tax rate schedules give tax rates for given levels of taxable income. There is a complex relationship between taxable income and actual income, making it difficult to draw conclusions from the tables. Even the marginal tax rates are misleading because there are various laws that relate taxable income to actual income such that an increase of a dollar of actual income results in an increase of more or less than a dollar in taxable income depending on the circumstances surrounding the increase, thus making the marginal tax rate dependent on an individual taxpayer's personal situation.

These schedules apply only to regular US income tax, whereas there is a second income tax, the Alternative Minimum Tax, that uses a different schedule. A taxpayer's tax obligation is the higher of those two income taxes, which makes drawing conclusions from the table even more difficult.

== Format ==
All rate schedules have an identical format, containing four columns and seven rows (called "brackets"). The first two columns indicate the range of taxable income that a taxpayer must have to qualify for a particular tax rate. The third column indicates the tax rate itself. The fourth column gives the range of income to which the current marginal rate applies.

Given that Congress has prescribed a system of progressive taxation, all but the lowest-earning taxpayers pay distinct rates for different parts of their income.

The following are the IRS rate schedules for 2025:

Schedule X — Single

If taxable income is over--	But not over--	The tax is:	of the amount over--
$0	$11,925	10%	$0
$11,925	$48,475	$1,192.5 + 12%	$11,925
$48,475	$103,350	$5,578.5+ 22%	$48,475
$103,350	$197,300	$17,641.1 + 24%	$103,350
$197,300	$250,525	$40,199.9 + 32%	$197,300
$250,525	$626,350	$57,231.9 + 35%	$250,525
$626,350	no limit	$188,770.65 + 37%	$626,350

Schedule Y-1 — Married filing jointly or qualifying widow(er)

If taxable income is over--	But not over--	The tax is:	of the amount over--
$0	$23,850	10%	$0
$23,850	$96,950	$2,385 + 12%	$23,850
$96,950	$206,700	$11,157 + 22%	$96,950
$206,700	$394,600	$35,302 + 24%	$206,700
$394,600	$501,050	$80,398 + 32%	$394,600
$501,050	$751,600	$114,462 + 35%	$501,050
$751,600	no limit	$202,155 + 37%	$751,600

Schedule Y-2 — Married filing separately

If taxable income is over--	But not over--	The tax is:	of the amount over--
$0	$11,925	10%	$0
$11,925	$48,475	$1,192.5 + 12%	$11,925
$48,475	$103,350	$5,578.5+ 22%	$48,475
$103,350	$197,300	$17,641.1 + 24%	$103,350
$197,300	$250,525	$40,199.9 + 32%	$197,300
$250,525	$375,800	$57,231.9 + 35%	$250,525
$626,350	no limit	$101,078.2 + 37%	$626,350

Schedule Z — Head of household

If taxable income is over--	But not over--	The tax is:	of the amount over--
$0	$14,100	10%	$0
$14,101	$53,700	$1,700 + 12%	$14,100
$53,701	$85,500	$7,442 + 22%	$53,700
$85,501	$163,300	$15,912 + 24%	$85,500
$163,301	$207,350	$38,460 + 32%	$163,300
$207,351	$518,400	$55,484 + 35%	$207,350
$518,401	no limit	$187,031.5 + 37%	$518,400

Caution: These tables shown above are accurate for 2021 only and do not apply for any other year.

== Use of rate schedules ==
To use a rate schedule, a taxpayer must know their filing status and amount of taxable income. Definitions related to one's filing status can be found in IRC § A.2(a-b), and general guidelines regarding taxable income are described in IRC § A.63(a-b). Once a taxpayer has made these determinations, he (1) references the pertinent rate schedule, (2) finds the appropriate bracket (based on her taxable income), and (3) uses the formula described in the third column to determine his federal income tax.

Assume, for example, that Taxpayer A is single and has a taxable income of $175,000 in 2021. The following steps apply the procedure outlined above:

(1) Because he is single, the pertinent rate table is Schedule X.
(2) Given that his income falls between $164,296 and $209,425, he uses the fifth bracket in Schedule X.
(3) His federal income tax will be "$33,602.42 plus 32% of the amount over $164,295." Applying this formula to Taxpayer A, one arrives at the following result:
$33,602.42 + (0.32 * ($175,000 - $164,295)) =
$33,602.42 + (0.28 * Standard deduction $85,650) =
$33,602.42 + $3,425.60 = $37,028.02.

Accordingly, Taxpayer A must pay $37,028.02 in federal income taxes for 2021. Since his income is in the fifth bracket, his marginal tax rate for each additional dollar he earns is 32%, but his effective tax rate is 21% ($37,028.02/$175,000 is .212).

== See also ==
- Income tax in the United States
- Progressivity in United States income tax
- Standard deduction

General:

- Tax bracket
