= Taxable wages =

Taxable wages, in payroll, is the sum of all earnings by an employee that are eligible for a particular type of tax. Each tax is different and has different regulations about limits to the amount of wages that can be considered taxable with respect to that tax.

In the United States, contributing to a 401(k) account will cause one's taxable wages to be lower than gross wages. Some taxes, such as Social Security, have other exemptions.
