= Tax rate =

Aspect of tax law

In a tax system, the tax rate is the ratio (usually expressed as a percentage) at which a business or person is taxed. The tax rate that is applied to an individual's or corporation's income is determined by tax laws of the country and can be influenced by many factors such as income level, type of income, and so on. There are several methods used to present a tax rate: statutory, average, marginal, flat, and effective. These rates can also be presented using different definitions applied to a tax base: inclusive and exclusive.

Effective tax rates have declined across developed countries since 1965, whereas they have increased in developing countries since 1990.

== Statutory ==
A statutory tax rate is the legally imposed rate. An income tax could have multiple statutory rates for different income levels, where a sales tax may have a flat statutory rate.

The statutory tax rate is expressed as a percentage and will always be higher than the effective tax rate.

== Average ==
An average tax rate is the ratio of the total amount of taxes paid to the total tax base (taxable income or spending), expressed as a percentage. Average tax rates is used to measure tax burden of individuals and corporations and how taxes affect the individuals and corporations ability to consume.

- Let $t$ be the total tax liability.
- Let $i$ be the total tax base.

$$= \frac{t}{i}.$$

In a proportional tax, the tax rate is fixed and the average tax rate equals this tax rate. In case of tax brackets, commonly used for progressive taxes, the average tax rate increases as taxable income increases through tax brackets, asymptoting to the top tax rate. For example, consider a system with three tax brackets, 10%, 20%, and 30%, where the 10% rate applies to income from $1 to $10,000, the 20% rate applies to income from $10,001 to $20,000, and the 30% rate applies to all income above $20,000. Under this system, someone earning $25,000 would pay $1,000 for the first $10,000 of income (10%); $2,000 for the second $10,000 of income (20%); and $1,500 for the last $5,000 of income (30%). In total, they would pay $4,500, or an 18% average tax rate.

== Flat ==
Flat tax rate, also known as single-rate, is one of the simplest taxations. Flat is a single tax rate (same percentage) on the whole taxable amount. A flat tax rate is used because of its simplicity, transparency, neutrality, and stability. Flat tax rates are quite transparent because it makes it easier for taxpayer to estimate their tax liability and for policymakers to estimate how changes would impact tax revenue.

One simplified example is a flat tax rate in Colorado. There is a flat tax rate determined at 4.4%. Assuming that an annual taxable income is $100,000, then the income tax is equal to $4,400.

A flat tax rate on income is used in many states of the USA, like Colorado, Illinois, Indiana, Kentucky, Massachusetts, Michigan, North Carolina, Pennsylvania, and Utah; or internationally, such as in many post-Soviet countries like Hungary, Serbia, Estonia or Ukraine; and in Iceland or Bolivia. In practice, no state has a perfectly flat income tax rate, and every state makes certain distinctions between types of income and has several discounts and reductions.

A poll tax, also known as a head tax, is a flat tax of a set dollar amount per person. As an example, in the history of the USA, a poll tax was introduced in 1870, which was a fee paid for the right to vote.

The marginal tax in these scenarios would be constant (in case of a poll tax—zero), but these are both forms of regressive taxation and place a higher tax burden on those who are least able to cope with it, often resulting in an underfunded government leading to increased deficits.

== Marginal ==
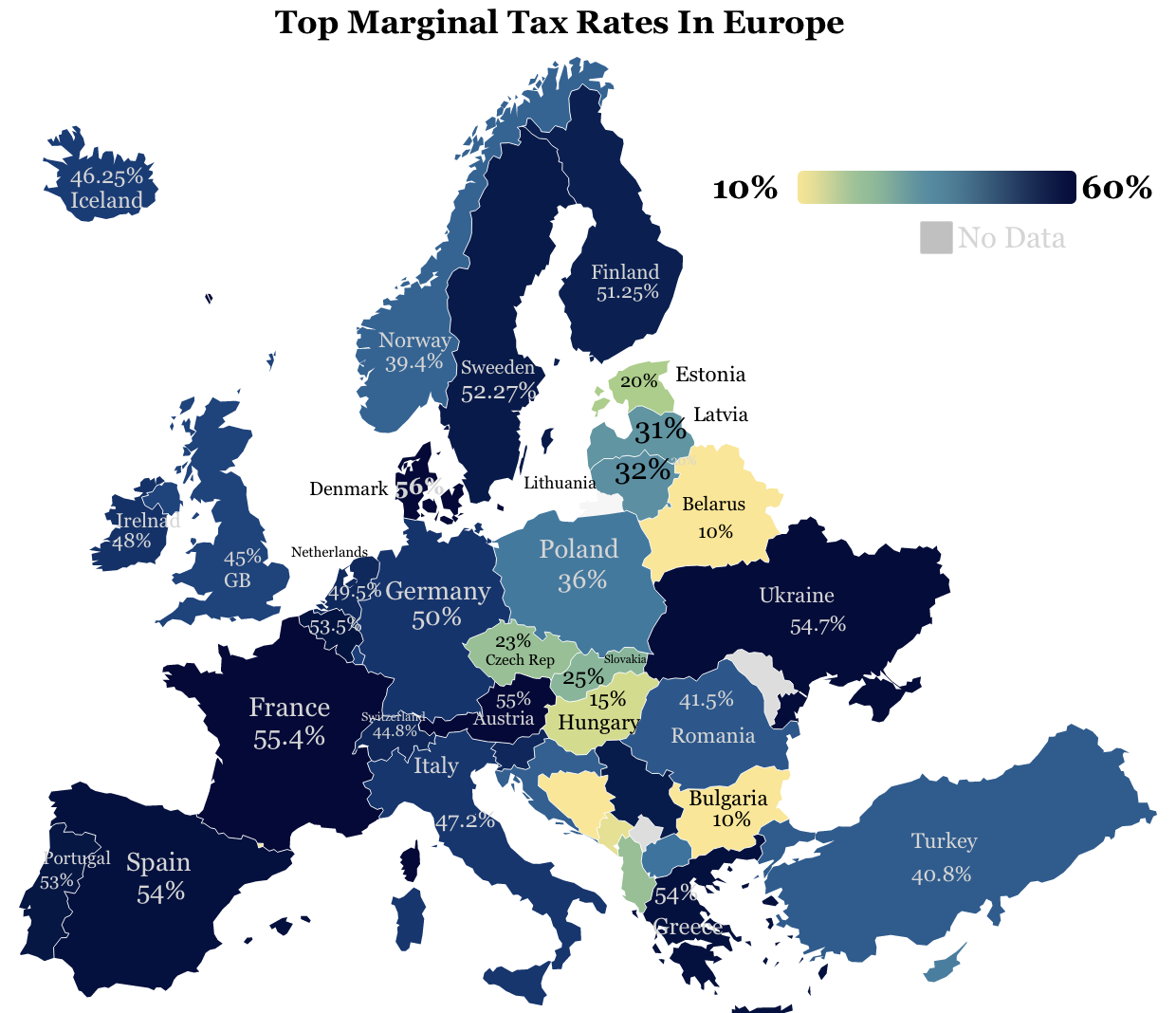
Top marginal tax rates in Europe (2022)

A marginal tax rate is the marginal rate indicating what percentage of additional income at a certain income level would be paid in taxes. For example, if an individual earning $1,000,001 pays $0.37 more in taxes than the same individual would pay if they earned $1,000,000, then their marginal tax rate at $1,000,000 is 37% because they paid 37% of the additional $1 of earnings in taxes.

The marginal tax rate on income can be expressed mathematically as $\frac{\Delta t}{\Delta i}$, where t is the total tax liability and i is total income, and ∆ refers to a numerical change. In accounting practice, the tax numerator in the above equation usually includes taxes at federal, state, provincial, and municipal levels.

Many jurisdictions use tax brackets with progressive tax rates, meaning the marginal tax rate is designed to be higher for the last unit earned by a high-income taxpayer than the last unit earned by a low-income taxpayer.

For example, in 2023, the United States used the following tax brackets:

2023 United States federal income tax brackets
Marginal tax rate	from...	up to…
10%	$0	$11,000
12%	$11,001	$44,725
22%	$44,726	$95,375
24%	$95,376	$182,100
32%	$182,101	$231,250
35%	$231,251	$578,125
37%	$578,126	And up

For an income of $58,000 per year, the first $11,000 of it is taxed at 10%, the next $33,725 at 12%, and last $13,275 at 22%. The marginal tax rate of this individual is 22%, because if they earned an additional $1, it would fall within the 22% tax bracket.

== Specific ==
A specific tax rate, or per unit tax rate, is a fixed amount of tax on a specific good or service. It means that the tax rate is not in the form of percentages but in the form of single units, which does not depend on the price of goods but on the amount of units. Specific tax is used in tobacco taxation because it has been proven that a high specific tax significantly enlarges the price of cigarettes, making it an effective way to reduce the consumption of such goods.

For example, the California tax rate on cigarettes is $0.1435 per cigarette stick and $2.87 per pack of 20 cigarettes. If a pack costs $10 or $12, the tax rate for both is $2.87.

== Mixed tax rate ==
For some goods exists a combination of two tax rates. The commonly known mixed tax rate is specific and flat at once. Usually, it is used for excise taxation or sin taxation used on tobacco, alcohol or fuel.

For example, in the United Kingdom, the flat tax rate for cigarettes is at 16.5 % of the retail price and also £ 6.33 per pack of 20. If the price of the pack of cigarettes before tax is £10.00, then specific tax is £ 6.33 and flat tax rate is £10.00 * 16.5% = £1.65. In this case, a pack of 20 cigarettes costs £17.98 and the tax expense is £7.98.

== Effective ==
The effective tax rate is the percent of their income that an individual or a corporation pays in taxes.

The term is used in financial reporting to measure the total tax paid as a percentage of the company's accounting income, instead of as a percentage of the taxable income. International Accounting Standard 12 defines it as income tax expense or benefit for accounting purposes divided by accounting profit. In Generally Accepted Accounting Principles (United States), the term is used in official guidance only with respect to determining income tax expense for interim (e.g. quarterly) periods by multiplying accounting income by an "estimated annual effective tax rate", the definition of which rate varies depending on the reporting entity's circumstances.

In U.S. income tax law, the term can be used in relation to determining whether a foreign income tax on specific types of income exceeds a certain percentage of U.S. tax that would apply on such income if U.S. tax had been applicable to the income.

A phenomenon connected with effective tax rate is its negativity, called negative effective tax rate, which occurs when the tax benefits received by an individual or corporation exceed the taxable income. A negative tax rate can happen because of factors such as tax credits, deductions, or incentives. For example, if a corporation has a pre-tax income of $100k and tax benefits of $110k, then the corporation has a negative effective tax rate.

Some calculations of the effective tax rate of individuals includes welfare benefits they receive from the state. This is commonly done when determining effective marginal tax rate.

== Inclusive and exclusive ==
Mathematically, 25% income tax out of $100 income yields the same as 33% sales tax on a $75 purchase.

Tax rates can be presented differently due to differing definitions of tax base, which can make comparisons between tax systems confusing.

Some tax systems include the taxes owed in the tax base (tax-inclusive, Before Tax), while other tax systems do not include taxes owed as part of the base (tax-exclusive, After Tax). In the United States, sales taxes are usually quoted exclusively and income taxes are quoted inclusively. The majority of Europe, value added tax (VAT) countries, include the tax amount when quoting merchandise prices, including Goods and Services Tax (GST) countries, such as Australia and New Zealand. However, those countries still define their tax rates on a tax exclusive basis.

For direct rate comparisons between exclusive and inclusive taxes, one rate must be manipulated to look like the other. When a tax system imposes taxes primarily on income, the tax base is a household's pre-tax income. The appropriate income tax rate is applied to the tax base to calculate taxes owed. Under this formula, taxes to be paid are included in the base on which the tax rate is imposed. If an individual's gross income is $100 and income tax rate is 20%, taxes owed equals $20.

The income tax is taken "off the top", so the individual is left with $80 in after-tax money. Some tax laws impose taxes on a tax base equal to the pre-tax portion of a good's price. Unlike the income tax example above, these taxes do not include actual taxes owed as part of the base. A good priced at $80 with a 25% exclusive sales tax rate yields $20 in taxes owed. Since the sales tax is added "on the top", the individual pays $20 of tax on $80 of pre-tax goods for a total cost of $100. In either case, the tax base of $100 can be treated as two parts—$80 of after-tax spending money and $20 of taxes owed. A 25% exclusive tax rate approximates a 20% inclusive tax rate after adjustment. By including taxes owed in the tax base, an exclusive tax rate can be directly compared to an inclusive tax rate.

Inclusive income tax rate comparison to an exclusive sales tax rate:

- Let $i$ be the inclusive tax rate (like an income tax). For a 20% rate, then $i = 0.20$
- Let $e$ be the exclusive rate (like a sales tax).
- Let $p$ be the total price of the good (including the tax).

The revenue that would go to the government:

$$p \times i$$

The revenue remaining for the seller of the good:

$$p - (p\times i)$$

To convert the inclusive rate to the exclusive rate, divide the money going to the government by the money the company nets:

$$e = \frac{p \times i}{p - (p \times i)} =\frac{p \times i}{p \times (1 - i)}= \frac{i}{1 - i}$$

Therefore, to convert any inclusive tax rate to an exclusive tax rate, divide the inclusive rate by 1 minus that rate.

- 15% inclusive = 18% exclusive
- 20% inclusive = 25% exclusive
- 25% inclusive = 33% exclusive
- 33% inclusive = 50% exclusive
- 50% inclusive = 100% exclusive

== Tax deductions and tax credits ==
Tax deductions and tax credits are two ways how to decrease taxpayer’s liability. Individuals can claim credits and deductions when they file their tax returns to lower their taxes, which is connected with marginal and average tax rates.

=== Deductions ===
A tax deduction is an amount a taxpayer can subtract from their taxable income, so they do not have to pay tax on it. By lowering individual taxes, taxable income is also lowered, and the average tax rate decreases too. Their value depends highly on the top marginal tax bracket. For example, if there is an individual whose top marginal tax bracket is 10%, then the maximum deductions from $2000 is $200. On the other hand, if there is an individual whose top marginal tax rate is 37% then the maximum deduction from $2000 is $740.

=== Credits ===
A tax credit is an amount that can be subtracted directly from an individual tax bill, which means that credits increase an individual's refund or reduce the amount of taxes that an individual owes. Tax credits again lower the average tax rate, but tax credits are not influenced by the marginal tax rate. If an individual has $2000 of tax credits, then their taxes are directly smaller by $2000.

== Optimal ==
The standard theory of optimal tax rate aims to design the tax to maximize social welfare while collecting a certain level of revenue.

=== Laffer curve ===
One of the theories on how to find optimal tax rates is called the Laffer curve (named after economist Arthur Laffer). The Laffer curve is a hump-shaped curve that compares the relationship between tax rate and tax revenue. The Laffer curve argues that raising tax rates beyond some level may reduce incentives enough to reduce output and tax revenues. There is, then, a tax rate at which tax revenues are maximized.

Economic historian Thomas Sowell says, "Tax rates and tax revenues can move in opposite directions."

== See also ==
- Capital flight
- List of countries by tax rates
- List of countries by tax revenue as percentage of GDP
- Progressive tax
- Proportional tax
- Regressive tax
- Tax exporting
- Tax incidence
- Tax rates of Europe
