= Taxable income =

Base upon which an income tax system imposes tax

Taxable income is that income which is subject to an income tax. Generally, it includes some or all items of income and is reduced by expenses and other deductions. The amounts included as income, expenses, and other deductions vary by country or system. Many systems provide that some types of income are not taxable (sometimes called non-assessable income) and some expenditures not deductible in computing taxable income. Some systems base tax on taxable income of the current period, and some on prior periods. Taxable income may refer to the income of any taxpayer, including individuals and corporations, as well as entities that themselves do not pay tax, such as partnerships, in which case it may be called “net profit”.

Most systems require that all income realized (or derived) be included in taxable income. Some systems provide tax exemption for some types of income. Many systems impose tax at different rates for differing types (e.g., capital gains or salaries) or levels of income (e.g., graduated rates). In the United States, gross income includes all income realized from whatever source but excludes particular tax-exempt items, such as municipal bond interest. In 2010, the United Kingdom and the United States both provided reduced rates of tax for capital gains and dividends.

Most systems and jurisdictions allow businesses to reduce taxable income by cost of goods or other property sold, as well as deductions for business expenses. Many systems limit some sorts of business deductions. For example, deductions for automobile expenses are limited in the United Kingdom and the United States.

Some systems allow tax deductions for certain nonbusiness expenses (sometimes called personal or domestic expenses). Such outlays may include personal expenses, such as a home mortgage interest deduction, and vary widely by jurisdiction. In addition, many systems only levy taxes on earnings above an income tax threshold, allow deductions for personal allowances or a minimum deemed amount of personal deductions. The United States federal tax system allows a deduction for personal exemptions, as well as a minimum standard deduction in lieu of other personal deductions. Some states in the United States allow few personal deductions.

== See also ==
- Income tax in Australia
- Income tax in Canada
- Income tax in Hong Kong
- Income tax in the United Kingdom
- Income tax in the United States
- Taxable wages
