= Personal exemption =

US tax exemption

Under United States tax law, a personal exemption is an amount that a resident taxpayer is entitled to claim as a tax deduction against personal income in calculating taxable income and consequently federal income tax. In 2017, the personal exemption amount was $4,050, though the exemption is subject to phase-out limitations. The personal exemption amount is adjusted each year for inflation. The Tax Cuts and Jobs Act of 2017 eliminated personal exemptions for tax years 2018 through 2025, and the One Big Beautiful Bill Act made the elimination permanent except for taxpayers aged 65 and up.

The exemption is composed of personal exemptions for the individual taxpayer and, as appropriate, the taxpayer's spouse and dependents, as provided in Internal Revenue Code at 26 U.S.C. § 151.

== Overview ==
Section 151 of the Internal Revenue Code was enacted in August 1954, and provided for deductions equal to the "personal exemption" amount in computing taxable income. The exemption was intended to insulate from taxation the minimal amount of income someone would need receive to live at a subsistence level (i.e., enough income for food, clothes, shelter, etc.). In addition to personal exemptions, taxpayers may claim other deductions that further reduce the level of income subject to taxation.

Generally speaking, for tax years prior to 2018, a personal exemption can be claimed by the taxpayer and qualifying dependents. A personal exemption may also be claimed for a spouse if (1) the couple files separately, (2) the spouse has no gross income, and (3) the spouse is not the dependent of another, §151(b). For taxpayers filing a joint return with a spouse, the Treasury Regulations allow two personal exemptions as well.

If a taxpayer could be claimed as a dependent by another taxpayer (regardless of whether anyone actually claims them), he or she cannot claim a personal exemption for himself or herself.

In computing taxable income, taxpayers may claim all personal exemptions for which they are eligible under §151, and deduct that amount from the adjusted gross income (AGI).

== Phase-out ==
The personal exemptions begin to phase out when AGI exceeds $309,900 for 2017 joint tax returns and $258,250 for 2017 single tax returns. Each tax exemption is reduced by 2% for each $2,500 by which a taxpayer's AGI exceeds the threshold amount until the benefit of all personal exemptions is eliminated.

In 2017, the personal exemption amount was $4,050, and it began to phase out at, and reached the maximum phaseout amount after, the following adjusted gross income amounts:

Filing status	AGI – Beginning of phaseout (2017)	AGI – Maximum phaseout (2017)
Married filing jointly	$313,800	$436,300
Heads of households	$287,650	$410,150
Single	$261,500	$384,000
Married filing separately	$156,900	$218,150

== Dependent requirement ==
Section 152 of the code contains nuanced requirements that must be met before a taxpayer can claim another as a dependent for personal exemption purposes. The general rule is that a personal exemption may be taken for a dependent that is either a qualifying child or a qualifying relative. § 152(a). However, there are several exceptions to this rule.

Taxpayers who are claimed as dependents of others cannot themselves claim personal exemptions for their qualifying dependents. § 152(b)(1). Married individuals who file joint returns cannot also be claimed as dependents of another taxpayer. § 152(b)(2). Non-U.S.-Citizens or nationals of other countries cannot be claimed as dependents unless they also reside in the U.S. or in contiguous countries. § 152(b)(3). However, taxpayers who are also U.S. citizens or nationals may claim as a dependent any child who shares the taxpayer's abode and is a member of the taxpayer's household. Id.

=== Qualifying children as dependents ===
Qualifying children must first be "children" in the sense of § 152(f)(1). The term "children" includes adopted children, children placed for adoption, stepchildren, and foster children. Id. Qualifying children must have the same principal place of abode as the taxpayer for more than one-half of the year and must not have provided more than one-half of their own support. § 152(c)(1). They can include a taxpayer's children, a taxpayer's siblings, half-siblings, or step siblings, or the descendants of a taxpayer's children, siblings, half-siblings, or step siblings. §§ 152(c)(2), (f)(4). They may not have reached the age of 19 by the close of the year, unless they are students, in which case they must not have reached the age of 24, or unless they are permanently and totally disabled. § 152(c)(3).

A child cannot qualify as a dependent on more than one tax return, so the code has a set of rules to prevent this from happening. § 152(c)(4). The code first attempts to break the tie by limiting eligible taxpayers to the child's parents, followed by the contending non-parental taxpayer with the highest adjusted gross income. Id. If more than one parent attempts to claim the child and they do not file a joint return, the code first attempts to break the tie in favor of the parent with whom the child resided longest during the taxable year. Id. If that does not break the tie, the parent with the highest adjusted gross income wins the right to claim the child as a dependent. Id.

For the treatment of children of divorced parents, see § 152(e). For a case in which children are missing and presumed kidnapped, see § 152(f)(6)...

=== Other qualifying relatives as dependents ===
A qualifying relative cannot be the qualifying child of any taxpayer. § 152(d)(1). The individual must have gross income less than the amount of the personal exemption. Id. The taxpayer must have provided over one-half of the individual's support. Id.

The allowable relationships between the taxpayer and the qualifying relative are almost innumerable, but under no circumstances can the relationship be one that violates local law. §§ 152(d)(2), (f)(3). Included are children (in the broad sense of § 152(f)(1)), descendants of children, siblings, half-siblings, step-siblings, father, mother, ancestors of parents, stepparents, nieces, nephews, various in-laws, or any other non-spousal individual sharing the taxpayer's abode and household. § 152(d)(2).

Special rules dealing with multiple support agreements, handicapped dependents, and child support are detailed at § 152(d)(3)-(5).

== History ==
Tax year	Personal exemption
1987	$1,900
1988	$1,950
1989	$2,000
1990	$2,050
1991	$2,150
1992	$2,300
1993	$2,350
1994	$2,450
1995	$2,500
1996	$2,550
1997	$2,650
1998	$2,700
1999	$2,750
2000	$2,800
2001	$2,900
2002	$3,000

Tax year	Personal exemption
2003	$3,050
2004	$3,100
2005	$3,200
2006	$3,300
2007	$3,400
2008	$3,500
2009	$3,650
2010	$3,650
2011	$3,700
2012	$3,800
2013	$3,900
2014	$3,950
2015	$4,000
2016	$4,050
2017	$4,050
2018	$0

The personal exemption amount in 1894 was $4,000 ($109,277 in 2016 dollars). The income tax enacted in 1894 was declared unconstitutional in 1895. The income tax law in its modern form—which began in the year 1913—included a provision for a personal exemption amount of $3,000 ($71,764 in 2016 dollars), or $4,000 for married couples. ($95,686 in 2016 dollars)

Over time the amount of the exemption has increased and decreased depending on political policy and the need for tax revenue. Since the Depression, the exemption has increased steadily, but not enough to keep up with inflation. Despite the intent of the exemption, the amounts are also less than half of the poverty line.

The exemption amounts for years 1987 through 2018 are as shown at right.

== Sources ==
- Years 1987 through 2006, Internal Revenue Service, Instructions for Form 1040 (for each listed year)
- Year 2007, Internal Revenue Service, Rev. Proc. 2006-53 (Nov. 9, 2006).
- https://web.archive.org/web/20070102205348/http://www.taxpolicycenter.org/TaxFacts/TFDB/TFTemplate.cfm?Docid=169
- Year 1913 and 1894, http://www.answers.com/topic/income-tax, American History section
- https://web.archive.org/web/20110718031608/http://www.westegg.com/inflation/
- https://www.irs.gov/publications/p501/ar02.html#en_US_2015_publink1000195627
