= Standard deduction =

US tax deduction

Under United States tax law, the standard deduction is a dollar amount that non-itemizers may subtract from their income before income tax (but not other kinds of tax, such as payroll tax) is applied. Taxpayers may choose either itemized deductions or the standard deduction, but usually choose whichever results in the lesser amount of tax payable. The standard deduction is available to individuals who are US citizens or resident aliens. The standard deduction is based on filing status and typically increases each year, based on inflation measurements from the previous year. It is not available to nonresident aliens residing in the United States (with few exceptions, for example, students from India on F1 visa status can use the standard deduction). Additional amounts are available for persons who are blind and/or are at least 65 years of age.

The standard deduction is distinct from the personal exemption, which was set to $0 by the Tax Cuts and Jobs Act of 2017 for tax years 2018–2025.

== Federal standard deduction ==
The applicable federal (individual states will have different amounts for state income tax) basic standard deduction amounts for recent tax years are as follows:

	Filing status				
Year	Single	Married filing separately	Married filing jointly	Qualifying surviving spouse	Head of household
2025	$15,750		$31,500		$23,625
2024	$14,600		$29,200		$21,900
2023	$13,850		$27,700		$20,800
2022	$12,950		$25,900		$19,400
2021	$12,550		$25,100		$18,800
2020	$12,400		$24,800		$18,650
2019	$12,200		$24,400		$18,350
2018	$12,000		$24,000		$18,000
2017	$6,350		$12,700		$9,350
2016	$6,300		$12,600		$9,300
2015	$6,300		$12,600		$9,250
2014	$6,200		$12,400		$9,100
2013	$6,100		$12,200		$8,950
2012	$5,950		$11,900		$8,700
2011	$5,800		$11,600		$8,500
2010	$5,700		$11,400		$8,400
2009	$5,700		$11,400		$8,350
2008	$5,450		$10,900		$8,000
2007	$5,350		$10,700		$7,850
2006	$5,150		$10,300		$7,550

=== Other standard deductions in certain cases ===
The standard deduction may be higher than the basic standard deduction if any of the following conditions are met:

- The taxpayer is 65 years of age or older.
- The taxpayer's spouse is 65 years of age or older.
- The taxpayer is blind (generally defined as not having corrected vision of at least 20/200 or as having extreme "limitation in the fields of vision").
- The taxpayer's spouse is blind (see definition above).

For each applicable condition, a taxpayer adds $1,500 to his/her standard deductions (for 2023). However, the additional deduction is $1,850 for unmarried individuals who are not qualifying surviving spouses.

For dependents, the standard deduction is equal to earned income (that is, compensation for services, such as wages, salaries, or tips) plus a certain amount ($400 in 2023). A dependent's standard deduction cannot be more than the basic standard deduction for non-dependents, or less than a certain minimum ($1,250 in 2023).

Consider the following examples:

Taxpayer	Standard deduction in 2023
70-year-old single individual	$13,850 + $1,850 = $15,700
40-year-old single individual who is blind	$13,850 + $1,850 = $15,700
Married couple, ages 78 and 80, one of whom is blind	$27,700 + $1,500 + $1,500 + $1,500 = $32,200
Dependent who earns $200 in 2023	$1,250 (minimum standard deduction for dependents)
Dependent who earns $6,000 in 2023	$6,000 + $400 = $6,400
Dependent who earns $18,000 in 2023	$13,850 (maximum standard deduction for single filing status in 2023)
