= State and local tax deduction =

Tax deduction in the United States

The state and local tax deduction (SALT deduction) is a United States federal itemized deduction that allows taxpayers to deduct certain taxes paid to state and local governments from their adjusted gross income.

The SALT deduction is intended to avoid double taxation by allowing taxpayers to deduct state and local taxes from the income assessed for federal income tax. Eligible taxes include state and local income taxes and property taxes.

The deduction disproportionately benefits wealthy and upper-middle-class taxpayers living in areas with comparatively high state and property taxes.

The SALT deduction already existed, but the Tax Cuts and Jobs Act of 2017, signed into law by President Donald Trump, imposed a $10,000 cap on the SALT deduction for the years 2018–2025.

The Tax Policy Center estimated in 2016 that fully eliminating the SALT deduction would increase federal revenue by nearly $1.3 trillion over 10 years.

== Definition ==
For US federal income tax purposes, state and local taxes are defined in section 164(a) of the Internal Revenue Code as taxes paid to states and localities in the forms of: (i) real property taxes; (ii) personal property taxes; (iii) income, war profits, and excess profits taxes; and (iv) general sales taxes. The Tax Cuts and Jobs Act of 2017 capped the use of this itemized deduction at $10,000 ($5,000 for married persons who file separately).

=== How it works ===
The SALT deduction allows US taxpayers to deduct certain state and local taxes paid from their federal income tax returns. Eligible taxes include state and local income taxes, property taxes, and either state and local sales taxes or state and local general sales taxes.

To claim the deduction, taxpayers must itemize their deductions on Schedule A of Form 1040. There is a $10,000 limit on the SALT deduction, or $5,000 for a married person filing a separate return.

== Effects ==
According to the Tax Foundation, Tax savings from the SALT deduction flow disproportionately to those with high incomes. According to the Joint Committee on Taxation, in 2014 88% of the benefit of the SALT deduction accrued to those with incomes above $100,000 and only 1% accrued to those making less than $50,000.

The SALT deduction primarily benefits those in high-tax states, which tend to be those with consistent Democratic legislative majorities. In 2016, the ten counties with the largest SALT deductions per filer (on average) were in New York, California, Connecticut and New Jersey. These ten counties are in the New York metropolitan area and San Francisco Bay Area, which have high concentrations of wealth and expensive real estate. Since the deduction was capped at $10,000 in 2017, many homeowners have been unable to deduct thousands of dollars they previously could, beyond what they pay in property taxes to state, county, and local governments.

In 2017, only taxpayers in New York, Massachusetts, Connecticut, and New Jersey (the states with the first, second, third, and ninth highest GDP per capita) on average sent more than $1,000 each to the federal government above what the state received per capita. Capping the SALT deduction increases this balance of payments deficit.

== History ==
=== Precursor ===
A deduction on state and local taxes predates the establishment of the permanent federal income tax instituted by the Revenue Act of 1913. To help fund the Civil War effort, President Abraham Lincoln signed the Revenue Act of 1862, which established a temporary income tax. The Revenue Act included a deduction for state and local taxes, as well as national taxes.

This Civil War-era income tax was repealed in 1871. A federal income tax was again introduced in 1894, and again included deductions for state and local taxes, but in 1895 the Supreme Court ruled the income tax unconstitutional in Pollock v. Farmers' Loan & Trust Co.

=== Creation: Revenue Act of 1913 ===
The first permanent income tax was established by the Revenue Act of 1913, after the ratification of the Sixteenth Amendment to the United States Constitution earlier that year. A deduction for state and local taxes, as well as for national taxes, was included in the Revenue Act. (Note: The various exemptions and deductions were so generous that less than 1 percent of the population paid income taxes at the rate of only 1 percent of net income.) The federal income tax has included a deduction for state and local taxes ever since.

=== Various changes ===
During the Great Depression, states expanded the number of taxes they levied to offset revenue shortfalls. This included an expansion in state income taxes (before 1930, only 14 states and Hawaii had state income taxes, which were imposed primarily on very high incomes at low rates) and state sales taxes (by 1940, sales taxes made up about 60% of state budgets). In response to the growing use of state sales taxes, in 1942 Congress made an explicit allowance for a deduction of state and local retail sales taxes.

The introduction of the standard deduction in 1944 limited the scope of the state and local tax deduction, as well as all other itemized deductions (taxpayers who choose to use the standard deduction may not use itemized deductions).

On several occasions, Congress has restricted the types of state and local taxes eligible for the SALT deduction. The Revenue Act of 1964 restricted the SALT deduction to state and local taxes on real property, personal property, income, general sales, and gasoline and other motor fuels. Amid the 1970s energy crisis, Congress passed the Revenue Act of 1978, which eliminated the deduction for state and local taxes on gasoline and motor vehicle fuel. The Tax Reform Act of 1986 disallowed sales taxes from being deducted, while the American Jobs Creation Act of 2004 gave taxpayers the option of deducting either state and local income taxes or state and local sales taxes.

=== Tax Cuts and Jobs Act of 2017 ===
The Tax Cuts and Jobs Act of 2017, signed into law by President Donald Trump, capped the total SALT deduction at $10,000 for the tax years 2018 through 2025. The bill also increased the standard deduction, which significantly reduced the number of taxpayers who claim the SALT deduction. As a result of the bill, the cost of the SALT deduction decreased from $104 billion in 2017 to $10.4 billion in 2019.

In January 2018, the states of New York, New Jersey and Connecticut (whose wealthy residents benefit disproportionately from the SALT deduction) sued the federal government over the constitutionality of the SALT cap, arguing that it unfairly restricts their ability to pursue their own preferred tax policies. In October 2019, a federal court dismissed the suit; appeal was declined by the Supreme Court on April 18, 2022.

=== Build Back Better Act ===
In July 2021, House Representative Tom Suozzi and Senate majority leader Chuck Schumer, both Democrats from New York, pushed legislation in the U.S. House of Representatives to repeal the deduction limit. In April 2021, as the Build Back Better Act was being debated in the House, a bipartisan group of House lawmakers formed the "SALT caucus" to advocate for the repeal of the $10,000 limit on the state and local tax deduction. They later threatened to block the bill if a raise on the SALT deduction was not included.

Ultimately, the version of the Build Back Better Act that the House passed on November 19, 2021, would have increased the SALT deduction cap to $80,000 until 2030, after which the increase would expire. Jared Golden was the only Democrat to vote against the act, because of his opposition to benefiting high-income taxpayers by raising the cap. The Build Back Better Act stalled in the Senate.

The Tax Policy Center concluded that more than 96% of the tax cut from raising the deduction cap to $80,000 would go to the highest-income 20% of households.

=== One Big Beautiful Bill Act ===
The One Big Beautiful Bill Act, signed into law by President Donald Trump, increased the total SALT deduction to $40,000 for taxpayers making less than $500,000, with the cap reverting to the previous limit of $10,000 after five years.

== Support ==
Advocates of the SALT deduction argue that it "helps state and local governments fund public services" because "higher-income filers are more willing to support state and local taxes" if they can deduct them from their federal tax liability. For instance, former Governor of New York Andrew Cuomo contended in 2017 that "New York would be destroyed" if the deduction were substantially reduced.

Economic modeling by economists Gilbert E. Metcalf and Martin Feldstein in 2011 suggests that eliminating the SALT deduction would have "little if any impact on state and local spending". Economist Edward Gramlich concluded in 1985 that eliminating the deduction would have "relatively modest" effect on state and local spending for low-income earners; he also finds that eliminating the deduction would likely not induce many high-income taxpayers to leave low-income communities.

However, a study by Center on Budget and Policy Priorities in 2017 concluded the opposite and stated that the measure would severely harm states, localities and Americans of all incomes especially middle- and low-income earners due to its indirect effects as states and localities move to more regressive tax systems i.e increase their taxes (e.g by increasing sales taxes) to reduce the tax burden on the wealthy residents which increased the most due to the change and cut spending on infrastructure, healthcare, housing and other social programs or economic welfare benefiting them to lower taxes and increase their tax competitiveness in response to the measure in a chain effect. The study also contends that the measure would increase the overall strain on state and local government budgets even more.

Advocates also argue that, while the benefit flows disproportionately to high-income taxpayers, it also provides tax relief to some middle-class taxpayers, particularly those residing in states with high state and local tax rates.

== Criticism ==
Detractors of the SALT deduction, both on the political left and right, often point out that the deduction primarily benefits high earners: according to the Tax Policy Center, the top 20% of taxpayers by income would receive 96% of the benefit of repealing the SALT cap. Some critics also contend that the deduction in effect results in low-tax states and cities subsidizing the federal tax payments of high-tax states and cities, though this is a contentious argument. (Note: Arguments that some states "subsidize" others—whether arguments that wealthier (often Democratic) states "subsidize" poorer (often Republican) states because the people in wealthier states collectively contribute more in federal taxes than they receive in federal benefits, or arguments that the SALT deduction results in low tax (generally Republican) states "subsidizing" high tax (generally Democratic) states—are based on the contentious premise that the taxes paid by the people of a state can be viewed as that state paying those taxes. An Associated Press "fact-checker", for instance, considers the fact that the residents of blue states collectively contribute more in taxes than they receive in federal benefits, while residents of red states collectively receive more in federal benefits than they pay in federal taxes, to mean that blue states "subsidize" red states. Two researchers at the Brookings Institution, however, argue that it is mistaken to act as if federal taxes paid by people within a state are equivalent to the state paying those taxes. They say, "The impression [that New York subsidizes other states] is that the Treasurer of New York State writes a big check to the Secretary of the Treasury. But of course, that is not what is happening. The IRS taxes people, not states. And rich people pay more taxes. So, a 'donor state' is just a state with lots of rich people living [in] it.")

Some conservative critics of the deduction argue that it encourages "wasteful spending" by state governments because it "insulates governments from negative consequences when they spend taxpayer dollars inefficiently".
