= Employer transportation benefits in the United States =

An employer in the United States may provide transportation benefits to their employees that are tax free up to a certain limit. Under the U.S. Internal Revenue Code section 132(a), the qualified transportation benefits are one of the eight types of statutory employee benefits (also known as fringe benefits) that are excluded from gross income in calculating federal income tax. The qualified transportation benefits are transit passes, vanpooling, bicycling, and parking associated with these things.

Commuting expenses in general are not excluded from taxable compensation in US tax law (for example, the cost of fuel to drive to the regular work place cannot be deducted). The goal of making the specific benefits described above nontaxable is to encourage forms of commuting that reduce road congestion and pollution.

== Overview ==
Tax-free commuter benefits, also known as qualified transportation fringes, are employer provided voluntary benefit programs that allow employees to reduce their monthly commuting expenses for transit, vanpooling, bicycling, and work-related parking costs. The benefit is a federal tax benefit authorized under the Internal Revenue Code Section 132(a), Qualified Transportation Fringes. Monies used for these eligible expenses are excludable from gross income subject to federal taxes. Many states also exclude these monies from state and local taxes.

Established in 1993 as part of the federal tax code section 132(f), commuter benefits were meant to provide tax incentives to employees to encourage their use of mass transportation, with the goal of reducing traffic congestion and improving air quality. The law provides for monthly caps on the amount that can be excluded from gross income and is therefore not taxed.

Eligible transit benefits include expenses the employer pays associated with employees using any public or privately operated transit service. One allowable form of transit benefit is providing employees with transit passes, including farecards, tokens, vouchers, or passes which entitle a person to the use of a transit service or to purchase a transit pass. The employer can also use cash reimbursement in certain circumstances where a voucher or similar instrument is not "readily available" as defined by statute. However, cash reimbursement must be supported by a "bona fide reimbursement system" which includes either receipts or a certification for the type of expense.

Vanpooling is an eligible benefit as long as the vanpool meets certain requirements, including that 80% of the mileage must be for the transport of employees to and from the place of work, and that the seating capacity must be for six employees plus the driver and at least half of the seats are used. Vanpools can be operated either directly or indirectly by the employer or arranged by the employee for the purpose of commuting.

Commuter parking is defined as parking at or near the workplace or at a location from which an employee commutes to work by transit, vanpool or carpool. In addition, parking which is for residential purposes is excluded.

The parking benefit is the only carpool related benefit in the statute.

Under current U.S. tax law, commuter benefits are tax-free to employees only through an employer. An employee cannot directly take advantage of these tax benefits by, for example, taking a tax deduction or a credit on that person's individual tax return. Depending on the level of employer, options for commuter benefits may include:

- An employer-financed tax-free fringe benefit by which a company pays directly for the cost of an employee's use of public transportation or parking (up to the designated tax-free maximum), with the value of such benefit not reported as part of the employee's gross income.
- An employee financed commuter benefit in which an employee designates a portion of salary before taxes (pretax income) to pay for qualified transit, vanpooling, or parking expenses (up to the IRS allowable monthly maximum).
- A combination of the previous two options in which a portion of the benefit is funded through a tax-free fringe, with the remainder funded with pretax income of the employee, provided the aggregate does not exceed the monthly statutory limits.

Qualified transportation fringe benefits allowed under section 132(f) include reimbursement for the cost of transportation in commuter highway vehicles (vanpooling), transit passes, and qualified commuter parking expenses. Benefits are commonly distributed in the form of prepaid transit tickets or metro passes (for use on subway, bus, light rail, ferry, or jitneys), prepaid transit or parking vouchers, debit cards or other electronic media (usable only for qualified commuter benefits), or cash reimbursements for transit or parking expenses. Commuter benefits are not governed under the same rules and regulations as Flexible spending account (FSA) arrangements and are treated differently for tax and reporting purposes.

Significant tax savings are available through commuter benefits programs for both employers and employees. If offered as a pretax benefit, employees save on their federal payroll taxes because the amount designated by the employee is deducted from their gross income, and employers save because they are not required to pay payroll taxes on such deducted amount. And for employees who are subject to state and local taxes that recognize pretax benefits, their savings can be even greater. Employers who provide the benefit as a tax-free fringe benefit (paid by the employer) save on payroll taxes because the employer does not need to include the amount of the fringe benefit in the employee's gross income. Normally, the amount of any fringe benefit provided to employees must be included in the employee's gross income, but qualified transportation fringe benefits provided under section 132(f) are excluded from this requirement.

== History ==
Prior to 1984, the IRS treated free employee parking, provided by an employer, as a tax-free fringe benefit regardless of the value of the parking. There was no tax-free benefit for transit commuting. This parking subsidy served as an incentive, in some cases a significant incentive, to drive to work even in areas where there was a good transit alternative. Many believed that such subsidies contributed to the growing congestion on the highways. In one study conducted in the New York City metro area, as many as 64% of the solo drivers commuting into Manhattan, an area well served by transit, were receiving a parking subsidy. The parking exemption was codified into law as part of the Deficit Reduction Act of 1984 when it was part of a new category of "working condition fringe benefits." Normally these kinds of fringe benefits referred to things that an employer provided, but would be tax-deductible if paid for by the employee. The cost of parking, however, could not be deducted by employees and so employer-paid parking did not fit this definition; nonetheless, an exemption for employer-paid parking was carved out.

The same 1984 law sought to redress the unintended consequences of tax-free employer-provided parking by creating a federal tax incentive for transit that employers could offer to employees. In response to a congressional request contained in that law, the IRS agreed to allow employers to provide a $15 monthly transit fringe benefit to employees. TransitCenter in New York was created by the area transit agencies working with local governments and the business community, and funded by the federal government, to create a program to sell this benefit to employers as one way to reduce congestion.

In 1993, as a result of the success of the TransitCenter program that was called TransitChek and the increasing cost of transit commuting expenses, a new section of the Internal Revenue Code was enacted to consolidate employer provided tax benefits for commuting under a single statutory provision and to expand incentives for transit and vanpooling. This new provision, section 132(f), increased the monthly cap for transit and vanpooling to $60 a month, limited the parking benefit to $155 a month and added an annual index that increased the monthly caps in $5 increments as the cost of living increased. However, the tax free benefits were limited to employer paid benefits until 1998 when the Internal Revenue Code was further expanded to permit as an alternative pretax or employee financed commuter benefits. The current commuter benefit program is a consequence of these changes.

One other major change in the interpretation of the commuter benefit law occurred in late 2006 concerning the growing use of debit cards for transit benefits, an issue not addressed in the statute or in previous regulations. In response to the growing use of debit and credit cards (and other electronic media) for purchases for transit passes, the IRS issued a new set of guidelines to take effect beginning January 1, 2010. The new ruling states that a debit card (or other electronic media) used to provide transit benefits must be restricted for use only at those points of sale where only transit fare media, tickets, and passes are sold (terminal limited debit cards) to qualify as self-substantiating so that they could be categorized as transit passes. Debit cards that are not terminal limited are considered cash reimbursement and require substantiation.

As of January 1, 2016, the monthly limit for qualified mass transit will always be equal to that of qualified parking.

Monthly limits for reimbursement
Year	Transit and Vanpool	Parking	Biking
2007	$110	$215	Not Available
2008	$115	$220	Not Available
2009	$120 for Jan-Feb and $230 for Mar-Dec	$230	$20
2010	$230	$230	$20
2011	$230	$230	$20
2012	$125	$240	$20
2013	$245	$245	$20
2014	$130	$250	$20
2015	$130	$250	$20
2016	$255	$255	$20
2017	$255	$255	$20
2018	$260	$260	Eliminated by the Tax Cuts and Jobs Act of 2017
2019	$265	$265	
2020	$270	$270	
2021	$270	$270	
2022	$280	$280	
2023	$300	$300	
2024	$315	$315	

== Employer provided transit passes and van pooling ==
Regular employees are allowed up to a certain limit for the combined value of employer provided transit passes plus commuting on an employer's van or bus. Any amount over the tax free amount is included in gross income.

Qualifying transit passes include tokens, fare cards, or vouchers for mass transit or private transportation businesses.

Qualifying van or bus pool vehicles must seat at least six passengers, with at least half the seats filled by employees, and be used at least 80% of the time for employee commuting.

Section 132(f) of the Internal Revenue Code allows an employer to pay commuting employees' "qualified transit" costs, up to a monthly limit. Commuter vanpooling is recognized by the IRS as a form of "qualified transit" along with bus, rail, and ferry services.

== Parking provided by employer ==
Regular employees are allowed up to a certain limit in tax free parking or subsidized up to that amount. Any amount over the taxable amount should be included in gross income. According to the Internal Revenue Service (IRS), parking benefits are to be valued according to regular commercial price for parking at the same or nearby location. Parking must be on or near the employer's premises, at a mass transit facility such as a train station or at a car pooling center.

== Bicycle commuter expenses ==
The bicycle commuter benefit was added to IRS Code 132(f) as part of the Emergency Economic Stabilization Act of 2008, signed into law on October 3, 2008. Beginning in 2009, employers were allowed to reimburse bicycle commuters up to $20 per month tax free for each month a bicycle is used for transportation between the employee's home and place of employment. Reimbursement may be for reasonable expenses incurred for the purchase of a bicycle, bicycle improvements, repair and storage. Bike commuters who receive any other transportation fringe benefit under Section 132 are not eligible to receive the bike commuter benefit.

The bicycle benefit differs from the transit and parking benefit in a few ways:

- The bicycle benefit may not be funded by an employee's pretax contributions; instead, it is reimbursed by an employer as a fringe benefit. Because this is a reimbursement, a “bona fide reimbursement” process must be utilized by the employer whereby the employee substantiates the expenses with receipts, or a certification in the absence of receipts, that the expenses were incurred for the eligible purpose.
- The bicycle benefit may not be received in any month in which an employee receives any other qualified transportation fringe benefit (i.e., transit pass, transportation in a commuter highway vehicle, or qualified parking). Thus, if an employee receives a non-bicycle transit benefit in a particular month, the employee is not eligible to receive the bicycle benefit for the same month, even if the employee commuted occasionally to work using a bicycle during that month.
- Reimbursement for bicycle-related expenses may be paid for eligible expenses incurred during the year in which the employee commuted by bicycle. Substantiation for the expense must be submitted within a reasonable period of time after the expense was incurred, which is typically within 180 days. These expenses may be paid through a period not to exceed three months following the expiration of the year in which the expenses were incurred. Thus, if the expense is incurred in 2009, the employee has through March 2010 to file for and receive the reimbursement.
- The bicycle benefit is not tied to the cost of living index, which applies to both transit and parking benefits. Unless amended in the future, the bicycle benefit is fixed at $20 per month.

This benefit was temporarily repealed for civilians as a part of the Tax Cuts and Jobs Act of 2017 and will go back into effect on January 1, 2026.

== Administration of Commuter Benefit Programs ==
There are several ways that employers implement commuter benefit programs. The most direct way is for employers to administer the program themselves arranging for transit passes, for example, to be sold or given to employees at the worksite. Thus, companies can contact a transit agency and purchase passes for their employees each month and use the employees’ pretax deductions to pay for the passes or provide the passes free to the employees as a fringe benefit. Alternatively, commuter transportation benefit providers offer transit benefit products like transit vouchers and transit debit cards for sale to employers that can be used by employees to purchase transit passes from any transit operator in an area. Because these approaches require time and effort of the company to identify which employees want to participate, what kind of pass or product they need and to handle distribution, this option is most often used by small and medium size companies. However, a few transit operators across the country have well established pass sale programs involving large corporations who want to contribute to the well-being of their community by participating in these types of programs.

More and more, medium and large companies have sought the assistance of third party administrators (TPAs) or commuter benefit providers to handle all the administration for their employees. In these cases, the provider will carry out enrollments, product selection, distribution and customer service for the company. In addition, the providers or TPAs handle all of the compliance issues necessary to ensure that the products and services are in conformance with IRS regulations. In exchange, the employer will pay a service fee to cover administrative expenses. Many of the largest companies located in major metropolitan areas where there is available transit utilize such providers.

== Treasury Regulations ==
Treasury Regulations provide for an additional type of transportation benefit. The value of a special vehicle design (such as bulletproof glass) intended to provide security is excludable from gross income if the design is for a bona fide business-oriented security concern.

== Terminology ==
- Commuter benefits - employer-provided benefits under section 132(f) of the tax code, covering tax-free transit, vanpool, or parking benefits.
- Commuter highway vehicle - a tax law term for vanpool as defined in section 132(f)(5)(B).
- Fare card - a card or ticket that a transit rider can use to ride on a public transit system.
- Fringe benefit - an employment benefit (such as paid holiday time or gym membership) that has a monetary value but that does not affect an employee's taxable gross income. (As opposed to offering a benefit pretax, meaning an employee's pretax deductions pay for the benefit and reduce taxable income.)
- Pretax - payroll deductions made before tax liabilities are calculated.
- Qualified transportation fringes - used in tax legislation to refer to benefits for transit, vanpool, and qualified parking expenses.
- Tax-free - with reference to commuter benefits, generally refers to an amount that—for tax purposes—is excludable from gross income. Can be either a fringe benefit (in addition to compensation) or pretax (in lieu of compensation).
- Transit - any form of rail, bus or ferry operated by a public or private entity.
- Transit benefits - same as commuter benefits but more specific to use of mass transit services such as commuter rail lines or buses.
- Transit pass - defined by IRC section 132(f) as a means any pass, token, farecard, voucher or similar item used for transit.
