= Two-percent haircut =

In the United States tax system, the two-percent haircut, otherwise known as the two-percent floor, is a limitation on miscellaneous itemized income tax deductions and is codified under Internal Revenue Code IRC § 67(a).

IRC § 67(a) states that a taxpayer can deduct "miscellaneous itemized deductions" only to the extent that the aggregate of such deductions exceed two percent of the taxpayer's adjusted gross income.

== Miscellaneous itemized deductions ==
Miscellaneous itemized deductions are everything except the twelve itemized deductions listed in IRC § 67(b). When considering whether something would qualify as a miscellaneous itemized deduction, and thus subject to the two-percent haircut, a taxpayer should refer to the twelve itemized deductions listed in IRC § 67(b). If the deduction at issue is listed, then it is not a miscellaneous itemized deduction and is not subject to the two-percent haircut. Itemized deductions listed in IRC § 67(b) are regular itemized deductions.

The policy reason for the two-percent haircut is quite evasive. We may be able to gauge Congress' intent with the two-percent haircut by looking at the possible reasons for including certain items. The most significant expense that is categorized as a miscellaneous itemized deduction is the unreimbursed business expenses of an employee. It is a possibility that Congress imposed the two-percent haircut on these expenses in order to weed out portions that may have been personal in nature, as major employee expenses are generally reimbursed by the employer anyway. However, this policy rationale does not make much sense when one considers Congress' unlimited allowance of many personal expense deductions (some above-the line). The two-percent haircut is a thing of mystery.

=== Application ===
As the two-percent haircut is a floor threshold for deducting miscellaneous itemized deductions, a taxpayer's deductions must exceed two-percent of the taxpayers adjusted gross income.

For example, suppose a taxpayer in year one has an adjusted gross income of $100,000. Two percent of her adjusted gross income is $2,000. To be able to deduct miscellaneous itemized deductions in calculating taxable income, her miscellaneous itemized deductions must exceed $2,000. If she has miscellaneous itemized deductions of $5,000, she may deduct $3,000 ($5,000–$2,000=$3,000). If she has miscellaneous itemized deductions of only $1,000, she will not be able to deduct anything because her deductions do not exceed the $2,000 (2%) floor.

== Significance ==
The two-percent haircut is one example of why a taxpayer would prefer an above-the-line deduction to a below-the-line deduction. Itemized deductions are taken "below-the-line" (after adjusted gross income has been calculated). Above-the-line deductions are not subject to the two-percent haircut. Additionally, above-the-line deductions are advantageous because they may be taken regardless of whether or not a taxpayer chooses to itemize his or her below-the-line deductions.

== See also ==
- Taxation in the United States
