= Fringe benefits in the United States =

Some types of fringe benefits are excluded from the Internal Revenue Code definition of gross income. These include fringe benefits which qualify as a (1) no-additional-cost service, (2) qualified employee discount, (3) working condition fringe, (4) de minimis fringe, (5) qualified transportation fringe, (6) qualified moving expense reimbursement, (7) qualified retirement planning services, or (8) qualified military base realignment and closure fringe.

== Fringe benefits excluded from gross income ==
=== No-Additional-Cost Service ===
A No-Additional-Cost Service is defined in Section 132(b) as any service provided by an employer to an employee if (1) the service is offered for sale to customers in the ordinary course of the employer's business and (2) the employer incurs no substantial additional cost in providing the service to the employee.

=== Qualified Employee Discount ===
A Qualified Employee Discount is defined in Section 132(c) as any employee discount with respect to qualified property or services to the extent the discount does not exceed (a) the gross profit percentage of the price at which the property is being offered by the employer to customers, in the case of property, or (b) 20% of the price offered for services by the employer to customers, in the case of services.

=== Working Condition Fringe ===
Working Condition Fringe is defined in Section 132(d) as any property or services provided to an employee so that the employee is able to perform her job. Examples include a company car for business travel, a cell phone provided primarily for business purposes, and job-related education.

For job-related education, the education must maintain or improve skills required as part of the job or that meet the express requirements of the employer. The educational requirements must be imposed as a condition of continued employment, status, or pay level, or satisfy new requirements of the position after hire. The educational requirements cannot simply satisfy the minimum educational requirements to qualify for employment.

If an employer pays for an employee's income tax return preparation, the expense does not qualify for a working condition fringe.

=== De Minimis Fringe ===
De Minimis Fringe is defined in Section 132(e)(1) as any property or service given to an employee by the employer which, after taking into account the frequency provided, has a value is so small as to make accounting for it unreasonable or administratively impracticable. Examples of de minimis fringe includes personal use of an employer-provided cell phone provided primarily for business purposes; occasional personal use of the employer's copier; low-value holiday gifts, other than cash or gift cards; occasional parties or picnics for employees and their guests; occasional tickets for theater or sporting events.

Under Section 1.132-6(b)(1) of the Treasury Regulations, all similar fringes must be considered together to determine whether they are de minimis. One free meal given to all employees once a year would qualify because the meals are infrequently provided. One free meal provided to a different employee each week throughout the year would not qualify.

Under Section 1.132-6(c) of the Treasury Regulations, cash never qualifies as a de minims fringe. Cash or gift certificates provided to an employee so the employee may buy a theater ticket does not qualify. It would qualify, however, if the employer purchases the theater ticket, provides the actual theater ticket to the employee, and the employer infrequently gives out tickets to employees.

Gift cards never qualify if they are redeemable for variety of merchandise or have a cash equivalent value. Gift cards do not qualify if they have a specific face value and are redeemable for merchandise at a store. If a gift certificate allows an employee to receive a specific item of low-value personal property, it is administratively impractical for the employer to account for the gift certificate, and the employer infrequently provides gift certificates to employees, then the gift certificate qualifies.

Although the Internal Revenue Service has not defined low-value, it has stated that an item worth $100 is not a low-value item.

While the Internal Revenue Service does not define infrequently, gifts to employees on a quarterly basis would not qualify as a de minimis fringe benefit.

Examples of tax-free de minimis fringe benefits include occasional typing of personal letters by an employee of the employer; occasional personal use of the employer's copier as long as at least 85 percent of the copier's use is for business purposes; occasional parties for employees and their guests; gifts of property (not cash) with a low fair-market value for a birthday, holiday, performance, illness, or family crisis; occasional tickets to a theater or sporting event; coffee, doughnuts, and soft drinks for employees; and personal telephone calls made by employees.

=== Qualified Transportation Fringe ===
Qualified transportation fringe is defined in Section 132(f) as (1)(A) transportation in a commuter highway vehicle between the employee's residence and place of employment, (B) any transit pass, or (C) qualified parking, if provided by an employer to an employee.

An employer-paid bicycle commuter benefit qualified between January 1, 2009, and December 31, 2017.

Provision of tax-free qualified transportation fringe benefits to employees on or after January 1, 2018, is not tax-deductible to the employer as an ordinary business expense. Per the Tax Cuts and Jobs Act of 2017, Tax-exempt employers must report tax-free qualified transportation fringe benefits provided to employees on or after January 1, 2018, as unrelated business income. The Taxpayer Certainty and Disaster Tax Relief Act of 2019 repealed that provision of the 2017 law so that thease benefits are no longer required to be reported as unrelated business income and no taxes are owed on such benefits.

=== Qualified Moving Expense Reimbursement ===
Qualified Moving Expense Reimbursement is defined in Section 132(g) as any amount received by an individual from an employer as payment for expenses that would be deductible as moving expenses under Section 217 if paid by the individual.

In accordance with the Tax Cuts and Jobs Act of 2017, Qualifying Moving Expense Reimbursement is no longer a tax-free benefit as of January 1, 2018, with the exception of individuals in the military moving due to military orders.

=== Qualified Retirement Planning Services ===
Qualified Retirement Planning Services is defined in Section 132(m) as retirement planning advice or information provided to an employee and spouse by an employer maintaining a qualified employer plan.

=== Qualified Military Base Realignment and Closure Fringe ===
Qualified Military Base Realignment and Closure Fringe is defined in Section 132(n) as one or more payments under Section 1013 of the Demonstration Cities and Metropolitan Development Act of 1966 to offset the adverse effects on housing values from military base realignment or closure.

== Other tax-free fringe benefits ==
Other fringe benefits may be excluded from taxable income under other sections of the Internal Revenue Code.

Section 74(c) excludes employee achievement awards given to employees for their service (five years or more) or safety record. The award must be a tangible item, not cash or gift cards; must be given to employee as part of a meaningful presentation; and cannot seem to be disguised compensation. An employer must have a written policy regarding such awards, awards must total no more than $1,600 per year, and the average award must not exceed $400. An award does not qualify as a tax-free employee achievement award if the award is cash, cash equivalents, gift cards, gift certificates, vacations, meals, lodging, tickets to events, stocks, bonds, other securities, and similar items.

Section 79 excludes $50,000 worth of group term life insurance coverage provided by an employer to an employee.

Section 104 excludes qualifying compensation by an employer for injury or sickness, such as through a workers' compensation insurance policy.

Section 105 excludes qualifying health or accident insurance benefits received through an employer.

Section 106(a) excludes qualifying accident and health insurance coverage provided by an employer.

Section 117(d) excludes qualified tuition reductions.

Section 119 excludes certain meals or lodging provided to the employee for the employer's convenience. The meals must be provided for a substantially non-compensatory reason that clearly benefits the employer rather than the employee. Examples include meals provided to an employee during the employee's working hours for an employee who must remain on site for emergencies that are reasonably expected to occur and that the employee would be required to remedy during the employee's meal period. Providing meals to employees in order to foster collaboration, morale, and overall well-being are not considered to be provided for the employer's convenience.

Section 125 excludes cafeteria plans, including health flexible savings account plans.

Section 127 excludes qualifying educational assistance plans.

Section 129 excludes a qualifying dependent care assistance program, such as a dependent care flexible spending account plan.

Section 137 excludes a qualifying adoption assistance programs.
