= Revenue Act of 1964 =

United States federal tax law

The United States Revenue Act of 1964 (Pub. L. 88–272), also known as the Tax Reduction Act, was a tax cut act proposed by President John F. Kennedy, passed by the 88th United States Congress, and signed into law by President Lyndon B. Johnson. The act became law on February 26, 1964.

Kennedy proposed the bill on the advice of Keynesian economist Walter Heller, who believed that temporary deficit spending would boost economic growth. The act was initially blocked by Democrats like Senator Harry F. Byrd, but Lyndon Johnson was able to guide it through Congress after the assassination of Kennedy in November 1963. The act cut federal income taxes by approximately twenty percent across the board, and the top federal income tax rate fell from 91 percent to 70 percent. The act also reduced the corporate tax from 52 percent to 48 percent and created a minimum standard deduction.

== Summary of provisions ==
The Office of Tax Analysis of the United States Department of the Treasury summarized the tax changes as follows:

- reduced top marginal rate (on income over $100,000, roughly $848,000 in 2021 dollars, for individuals; and over $180,000; roughly $1,527,000 in 2021 dollars, for heads of households) from 91% to 70%
- reduced corporate tax rate from 52% to 48%
- phased-in acceleration of corporate estimated tax payments (through 1970)
- created minimum standard deduction of $300 + $100/exemption (total $1,000 max)

Revenue Act of 1964
Income Brackets	Income Tax Rates in 1963	Income Tax Rates in 1964	Income Tax Rates in 1965
up to $500.00	20%	16%	14%
$500.01-$1,000.00	20%	16.5%	15%
$1,000.01-$1,500.00	20%	17.5%	16%
$1,500.01-$2,000.00	20%	18%	17%
$2,000.01-$4,000.00	22%	20%	19%
$4,000.01-$6,000.00	26%	23.5%	22%
$6,000.01-$8,000.00	30%	27%	25%
$8,000.01-$10,000.00	34%	30.5%	28%
$10000.01-$12,000.00	38%	34%	32%
$12,000.01-$14,000.00	43%	37.5%	36%
$14,000.01-$16,000.00	47%	41%	39%
$16,000.01-$18,000.00	50%	44.5%	42%
$18,000.01-$20,000.00	53%	47.5%	45%
$20,000.01-$22,000.00	56%	50.5%	48%
$22,000.01-$26,000.00	59%	53.5%	50%
$26,000.01-$32,000.00	62%	56%	53%
$32000.01-$38,000.00	65%	58.5%	55%
$38,000.01-$44,000.00	69%	61%	58%
$44,000.01-$50,000.00	72%	63.5%	60%
$50000.01-$60,000.00	75%	66%	62%
$60,000.01-$70,000.00	78%	68.5%	64%
$70,000.01-$80,000.00	81%	71%	66%
$80,000.01-$90,000.00	84%	73.5%	68%
$90,000.01-$100,000.00	87%	75%	69%
$100,000.01-$150,000.00	89%	76.5%	70%
$150,000.01-$200,000.00	90%	76.5%	70%
$200,000.01 or more	91%	77%	70%

== Passage ==
The President addressed the issue of tax reform before the Economic Club of New York at the Waldorf-Astoria Hotel in New York City on December 14, 1962. On the advice of Walter Heller, the Chairman of the Council of Economic Advisers, President John F. Kennedy proposed a tax cut designed to help spur economic growth. Kennedy believed that the tax cut would stimulate consumer demand, which in turn would lead to higher economic growth, lower unemployment, and increased federal revenues. Kennedy's support for a tax cut reflected his conversion to Keynesian economics, which favored temporary deficit spending in order to boost economic growth. In January 1963, Kennedy presented Congress with a tax proposal that would reduce the top marginal tax rate from 91 percent to 65 percent, and lower the corporate tax rate from 52 percent to 47 percent; in total, the cut was projected to decrease income taxes by about $10 billion and corporate taxes by about $3.5 billion. The plan also included reforms designed to reduce the impact of itemized deductions, as well as provisions to help the elderly and handicapped. Conservatives revolted at giving Kennedy a key legislative victory before the election of 1964 and blocked the bill in Congress.

Lyndon B. Johnson succeeded Kennedy as president after the latter was assassinated in November 1963. After Johnson agreed to decrease the total federal budget to under $100 billion, powerful conservative Senator Harry F. Byrd dropped his opposition to a tax cut, clearing the way for its passage as the Revenue Act of 1964. Johnson signed the bill into law on February 26, 1964. Passage of the long-stalled tax cut facilitated efforts to move ahead on the Civil Rights Act of 1964.

== Impact ==
The stated goals of the tax cuts were to raise personal incomes, increase consumption, and increase capital investments. Evidence shows that these goals were exceeded by large degree with the combination of tax cuts and domestic spending programs President Johnson advocated, such as Medicare. Unemployment fell from 5.2% in 1964 to 4.5% in 1965, and fell to 3.8% in 1966. Initial estimates predicted a loss of revenue as a result of the tax cuts; however, tax revenue increased in 1965 though it declined in 1964 versus 1963 (on constant dollar basis).
