= Child tax credit (United States) =

Tax credit for parents with dependent children

The United States federal child tax credit (CTC) is a partially-refundable (Note: As described by the Tax Foundation, a tax credit is refundable if it "can be used to generate a federal tax refund larger than the amount of tax paid". In other words, if the value of a refundable tax credit is larger than the amount of tax owed, the taxpayer receives the difference as a tax refund. The current CTC is only partially refundable because only $1,400 of the $2,000 credit can be refunded.) tax credit for parents with dependent children. It provides $2,000 in tax relief per qualifying child, with up to $1,600 of that refundable (subject to a refundability threshold, phase-in and phase-out (Note: A refundability threshold, also sometimes called an earned income threshold, is the minimum amount of income a taxpayer must make to qualify for the refundable portion of the credit. Under the CTC's current structure, that threshold is $2,500. Above the refundability threshold, the credit phases in, i.e. more of the credit is made available to taxpayers as their income increases, up to the maximum credit amount. The current CTC phases in at 15%, meaning that for every $100 of income above the refundability threshold the taxpayer becomes eligible for $15 more of the refundable credit. See Overview.)). In 2021, following the passage of the American Rescue Plan Act of 2021, it was temporarily raised to $3,600 per child under the age of 6 and $3,000 per child between the ages of 6 and 17; it was also made fully-refundable (Note: The full credit value was made refundable and the phase-in was eliminated.) and half was paid out as monthly benefits.

The CTC was estimated to have lifted about 3 million children out of poverty in 2016. A Columbia University study estimated that the expansion of the CTC in the 2021 American Rescue Plan Act reduced child poverty by an additional 26%, and would have decreased child poverty by an additional 40% had all eligible households claimed the credit. The expansion also substantially reduced food insufficiency. Research indicates that cash transfers to families, like the refundable portion of the CTC, lead to improved math and reading test scores, a higher likelihood of high school graduation, higher college attendance, and long-term increases in income for both parents and children. Studies have also determined that the CTC increases labor force participation among low-income parents.

The CTC was created in 1997 as part of the Taxpayer Relief Act of 1997. Initially a small $500 per child nonrefundable credit, it was progressively made larger and extended to more taxpayers through subsequent legislation. In particular, it was temporarily raised to $1,000 per child and made refundable, subject to a phase-in, by the Jobs and Growth Tax Relief Reconciliation Act of 2003; that raise was made permanent by the American Taxpayer Relief Act of 2012; the credit was temporarily raised to $2,000 per child, with up to $1,400 of that refundable, and the number of taxpayers eligible substantially expanded by the Tax Cuts and Jobs Act of 2017; and finally the credit was expanded substantially and made fully available to very low-income people for one year by the American Rescue Plan Act of 2021.

== Overview ==
=== 2017–2025, excluding 2021 ===
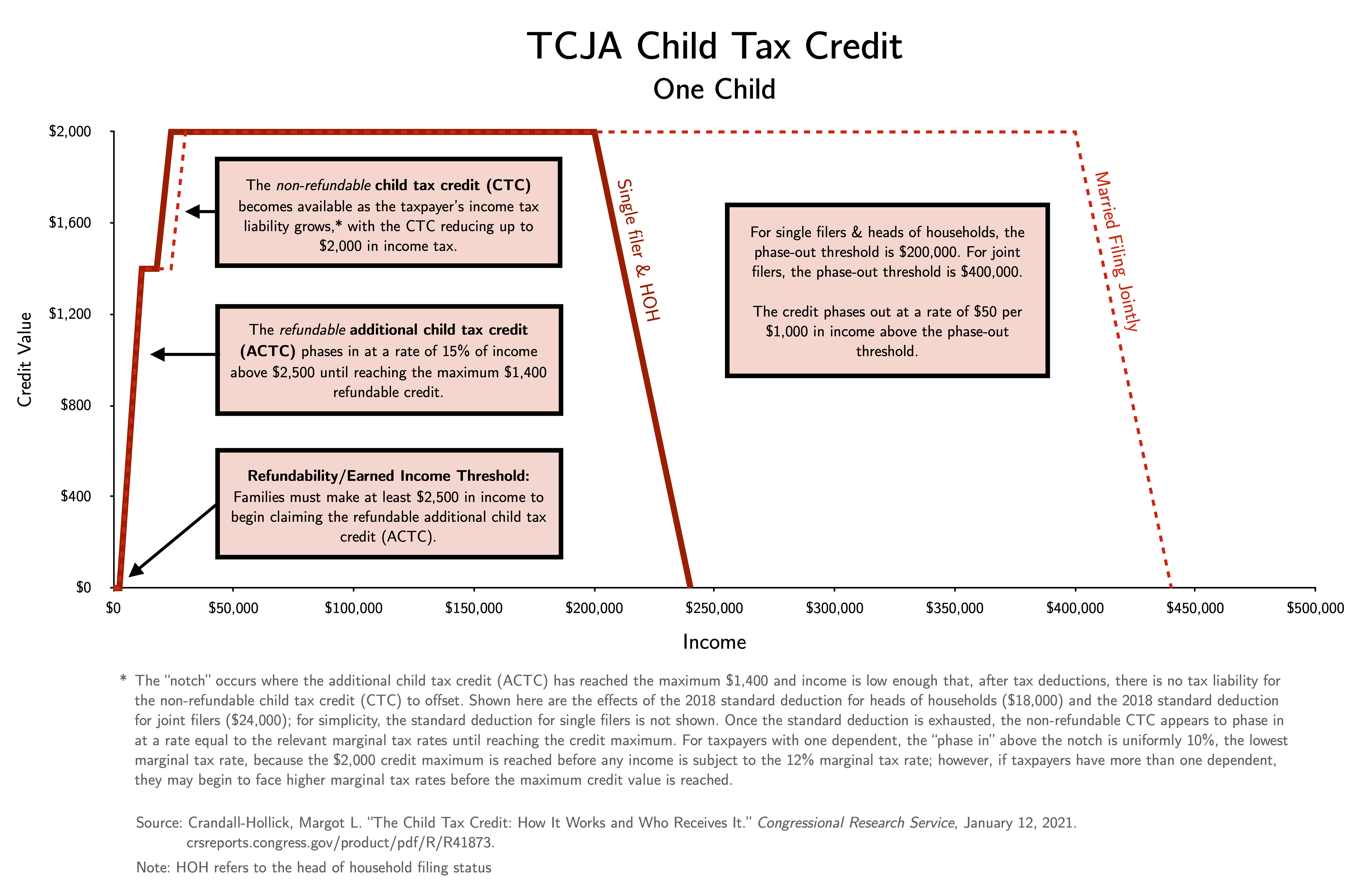
The child tax credit under the Tax Cuts and Jobs Act of 2017. Top plateau would be higher for more children.

Under the Tax Cuts and Jobs Act of 2017 (TCJA), for the years 2018–2025 (excluding 2021, see below section Temporary Expansion in 2021) the CTC allows taxpayers to reduce their federal tax liabilities by $2,000 per qualifying child (see Eligibility). The maximum credit a taxpayer can receive is thus equal to the number of qualifying children multiplied by $2,000 (e.g. a family with 3 qualifying children is eligible for $2,000 x 3 = $6,000 in tax relief). The credit begins to phase out at a rate of $50 for every $1,000 in additional income over $200,000 for single filers and unmarried heads of households or over $400,000 for married joint filers.

Taxpayers whose incomes are too low to claim the full $2,000 credit (i.e. they have tax liabilities below $2,000) are eligible for the additional child tax credit (ACTC), a phased-in $1,400 ($1,600 starting 2023) refundable tax credit with similar qualifications. For example, if a taxpayer has one qualifying child and a tax liability of $100, then they can use $100 of the CTC to reduce their tax liability to $0 and then claim the full $1,400 ACTC (which will be refunded to them) for a total benefit of $1,500. Note, however, that the sum of the ACTC and CTC cannot exceed the maximum credit of $2,000. For instance, a taxpayer with one qualifying child and an $800 tax liability can use $800 of the CTC to reduce their tax liability to $0, but can only claim $1,200 of the ACTC (which will be refunded to them), for the maximum allowable benefit of $2,000.

However, a certain amount of earned income is required to begin taking the credit. The ACTC is calculated only on amount of earned income above $2,500. It phases in above $2,500, at a rate of 15%, up to the maximum-allowable $1,400 per child. For example, a taxpayer who makes $8,000 in earned income and has one qualifying child is eligible for .15($8,000–$2,500)=$825 of the ACTC. Notice that the income range of the phase-in increases with the number of qualifying children: a taxpayer making $30,000, for instance, could claim the full ACTC if they have one child (since .15($30,000 – $2,500) = $4,125 is greater than the maximum allowable $1,400 for one child) but could not claim the full credit if they have three children (since .15($30,000 – $2,500) = $4,125 is less than the maximum allowable $1,400 x 3 = $4,200 for three children).

The Congressional Research Service estimates that about 1 in 5 taxpayers with eligible children fall into the phase-in range (i.e. they had incomes too low to receive the maximum credit).

=== Temporary expansion in 2021 ===
Expanded Child Tax Credit

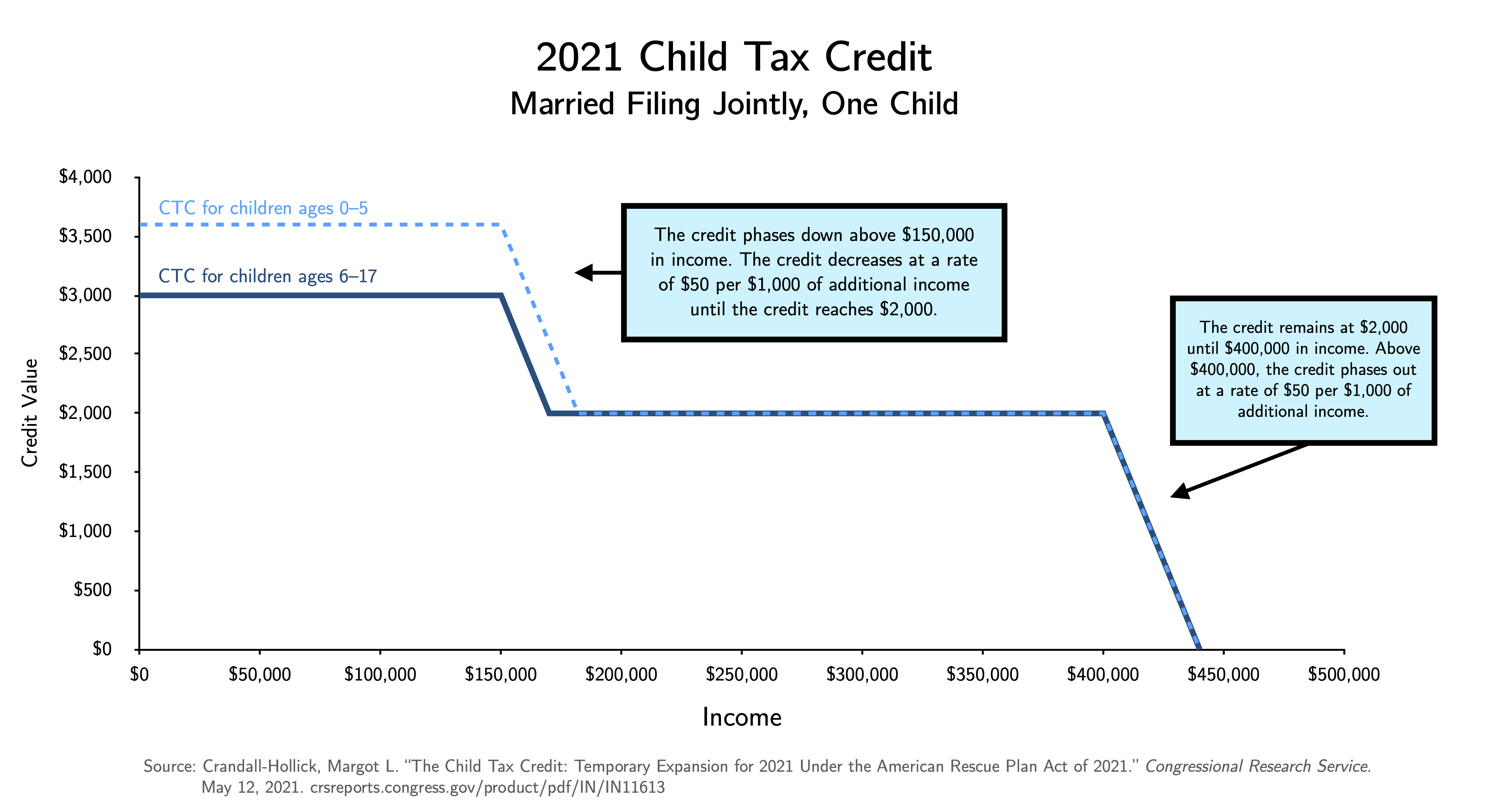
Expanded child tax credit (CTC) for married households filing jointly

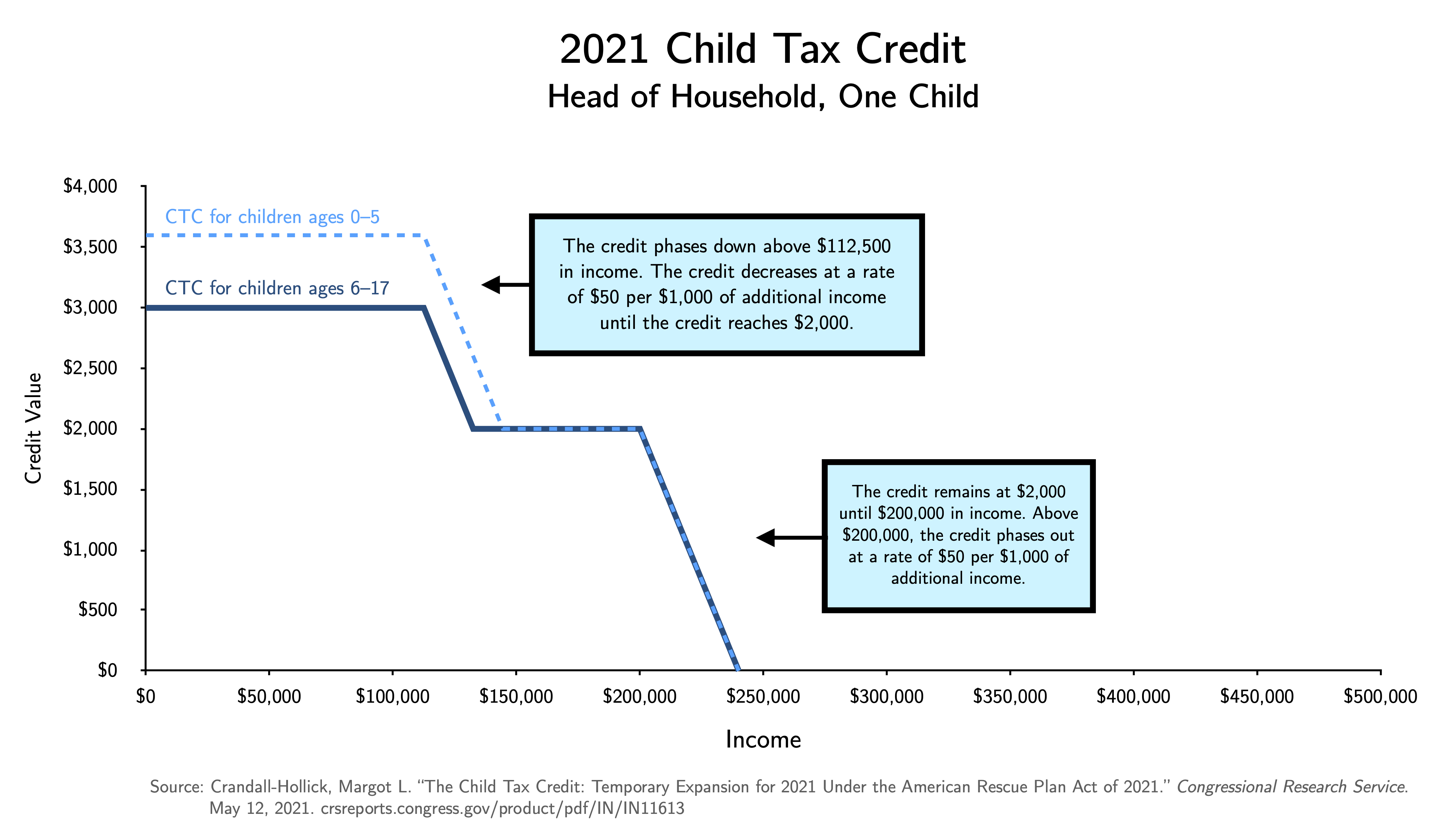
Expanded child tax credit (CTC) for unmarried heads of households

The child tax credit was substantially expanded for one year under the American Rescue Plan Act of 2021 (ARP), a stimulus bill passed during the economic downturn caused by the COVID-19 pandemic. The ARP increased the credit to $3,600 per child under the age of 6 and $3,000 per child between the ages of 6 and 17 (note that it increased the maximum age for an eligible child from 16 to 17). More specifically, it increased the tax credit to $3,600/$3,000 per child for single filers with incomes below $75,000, for unmarried heads of households with incomes below $112,500, and for married joint filers with incomes below $150,000. The credit phases down to a $2,000 credit (the value of the TCJA CTC) above these income levels, remains at $2,000 until income reaches $200,000 for single filers and unmarried heads of households or $400,000 for married joint filers, and then phases down to $0.

The ARP also made the credit fully refundable (i.e. it eliminated the income threshold and phase-in, making the credit fully available to people with very low incomes) and offered the option of receiving half of the credit as advance monthly payments, with the other half received as a tax refund when filing taxes in early 2022. Full refundability made the full value of the credit available to lower-income families, who previously tended to receive little or no benefit. (Note: In practice, however, the Internal Revenue Service (IRS) faced a number of administrative difficulties when determining eligibility for the CTC, which reduced the number of low-income households who received the credit. See Criticism: Administrative difficulties section.)

=== Post-2025 ===
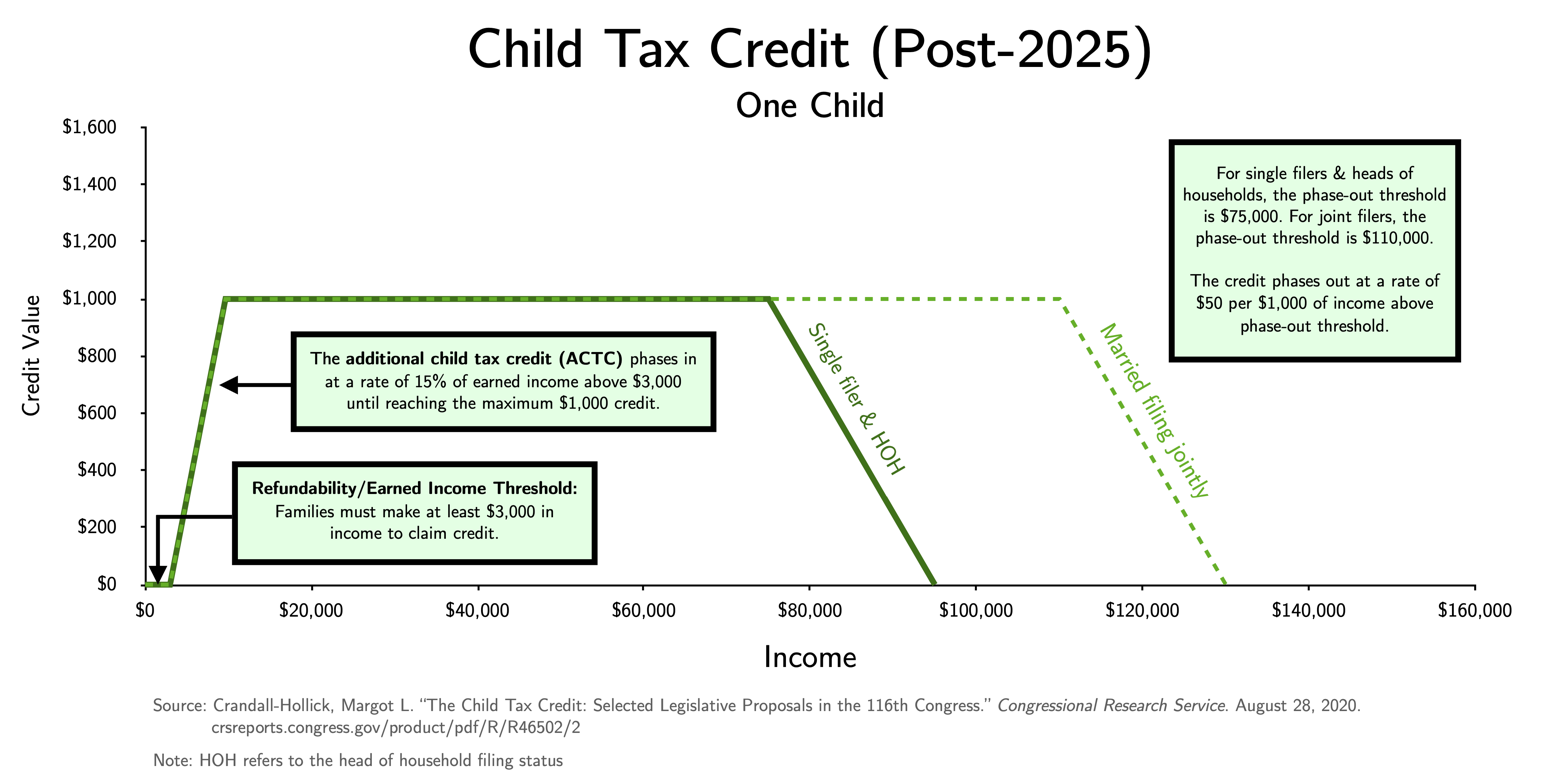
The child tax credit as it is scheduled to exist post-2025

The $2,000 child tax credit instituted by the Tax Cuts and Jobs Act of 2017 (TCJA) is scheduled to expire in 2025. Under the One Big Beautiful Bill Act, the tax credit was increased by 10% to $2,200 in 2026 and is adjusted for inflation annually. The refundable portion reverted to its 2022 amount of $1,400, although it is adjustable for inflation. The income phaseout has been fixed at $200,000 ($400,000 for married filing jointly) and will not be indexed for inflation. The taxpayer and the eligible child must have a work-eligible Social Security number which is estimated to remove approximately 4.5 million children from eligibility who are in mixed-status families.

=== Related credits ===
The child and dependent care credit allows eligible taxpayers to subtract $3,000 per child from their taxes for certain childcare services, capped at a total of $6,000 annually per taxpayer. The Tax Cuts and Jobs Act of 2017 created an additional dependent credit, allowing families to claim an additional $500 for an aging parent or older child requiring special care.

=== Comparison chart ===
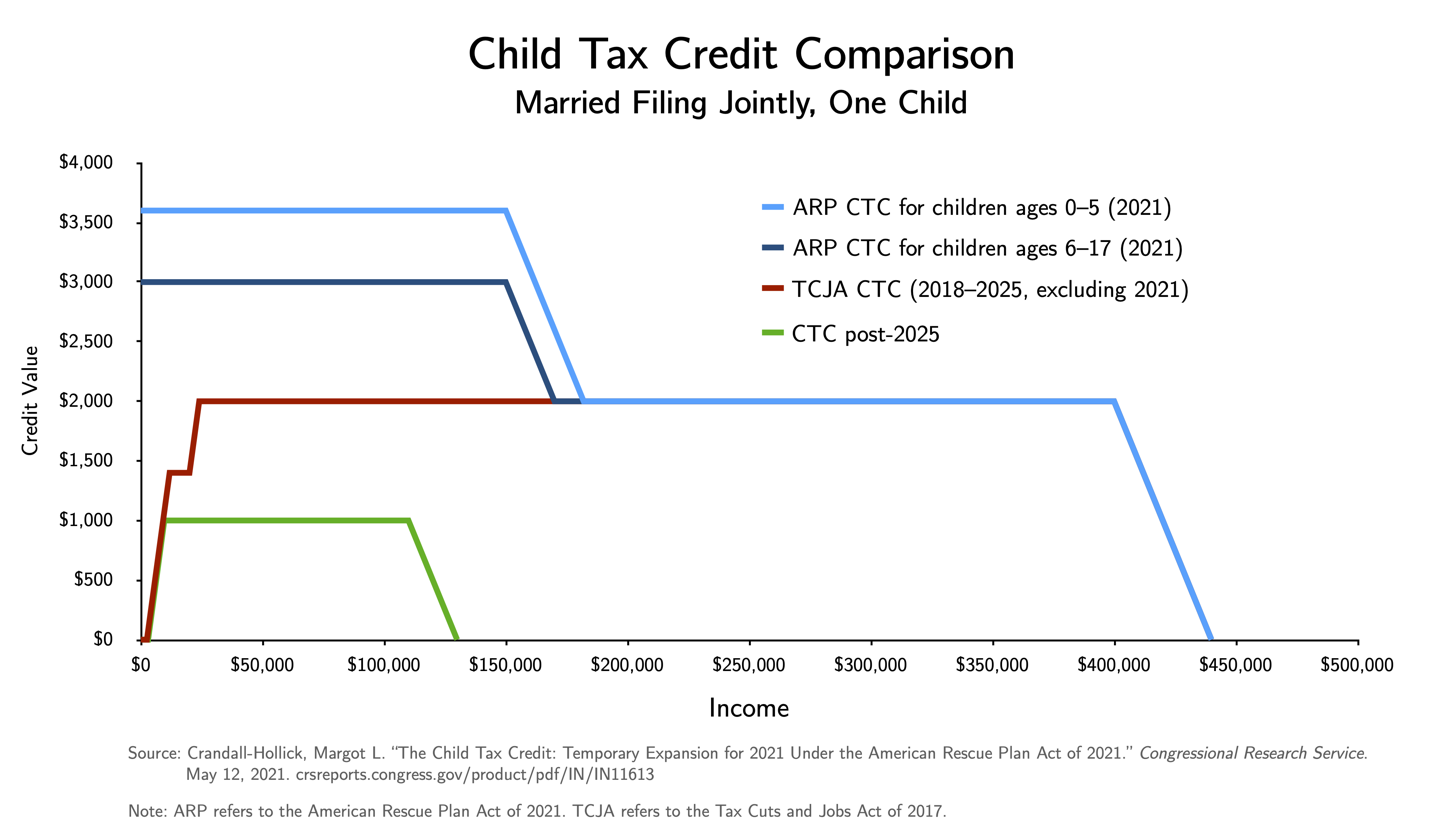
The below chart displays the differences between the three forms of the child tax credit explained above for joint filers.

== Eligibility ==
The child tax credit is available to taxpayers who have a "qualifying child." A person is a "qualifying child" if they are under the age of 17 (or, in 2021, under the age of 18) at the end of the taxable year and meets the requirements of 26 U.S.C. Sec. 152(c). In general, a qualifying child is any individual for whom the taxpayer can claim a dependency exemption and who is the taxpayer's son or daughter (or descendant of either), stepson or stepdaughter (or descendant of either), or eligible foster child. For unmarried couples or married couples filing separately, a qualifying child will be treated as such for the purpose of the CTC for the taxpayer who is the child's parent, or if not a parent, the taxpayer with the highest adjusted gross income (AGI) for the taxable year in accordance with 26 U.S.C. Sec. 152(c)(4)(A).

The Tax Cuts and Jobs Act of 2017 restricted the credit to only those dependent children possessing a Social Security Number (SSN); previously, dependents who did not possess a SSN because of their immigration status could still be eligible for the credit using an Individual Taxpayer Identification Number (ITIN). The One Big Beautiful Bill Act further extended this requirement to the parent claiming the credit (or one parent if filing jointly).

To receive the credit as a refund there are income requirements, see Overview.

== Effects ==
The child tax credit—especially the fully-refundable 2021 expanded child tax credit—significantly reduces child poverty. According to the Center on Budget and Policy Priorities, in 2018 the CTC, in conjunction with the earned income tax credit (EITC), lifted 5.5 million children above the poverty line. A 2021 Columbia University study estimated that the expansion of the CTC instituted by the American Rescue Plan Act reduced child poverty by an additional 26%, and would have decreased child poverty by 40% had all eligible households claimed the credit; the same group found that in the first month after the expansion of the CTC expired, child poverty rose from 12.1% to 17%, a 41% increase representing 3.7 million children. Additionally, changes to official poverty statistics understate the poverty alleviation effects of the child tax credit: the CTC does not raise the incomes of many poor families above the poverty line—and thus they do not appear in poverty reduction statistics—even though CTC benefits provide these families with substantial boosts in income.

Research indicates that income from the CTC and EITC leads to improved educational outcomes for young children in low-income households and is associated with decreased child behavioral problems and significant increases in college attendance among high school seniors in low-income families. Studies on the 2021 expanded CTC determined that the additional benefits decreased food insufficiency by about 25%. (Note: Reducing food insufficiency, along with ensuring people have sufficient food for themselves, has also been found to reduce the incidence of severe mental distress among parents.) Evidence on cash transfers, like the refundable portion of the CTC, shows that children in families receiving them have improved math and reading test scores, a higher likelihood of high school graduation, and a 1–2% increase in earnings in adulthood; they also lead to "persistent" increases in parents' earned income. Evidence on the earned income tax credit and cash transfer programs in other countries also indicates that cash benefits reduce the rate of violent crime.

Two surveys of people who claimed the 2021 expanded child tax credit, one by the United States Census Bureau and another by the University of Michigan in collaboration with Propel, a technology firm, found that most families used the monthly CTC payments to pay for basic needs like food, rent, school supplies, utilities, and clothing, as well as to reduce personal debt. A survey by the American Enterprise Institute determined that lower income families were most likely to spend the benefit while higher-income families were most likely to save it.

A study of the labor effects of the CTC from 2001 to 2016, which included a phase-in, determined that the CTC increased labor force participation by 9.6 percentage points among low-income parents of older children. While some economic models predicted that the 2021 expansion of the CTC, which increased the credit value and eliminated the phase-in, would lead to modest negative employment effects relative to the prior CTC (while still having substantial anti-poverty effects), empirical research has indicated that, in the six-month period that monthly CTC payments were distributed, effects on employment and labor force participation were minimal.

== History ==
=== Origins ===
The child tax credit was created in 1997 as part of the Taxpayer Relief Act of 1997. Initially it was a $500-per-child (up to age 16) nonrefundable credit intended to provide tax relief to middle- and upper-middle-income families. The credit phased out for higher earners at a rate of $50 for every $1,000 in additional income over $110,000 for taxpayers filing as married joint, $75,000 for taxpayers filing as head of household, and $55,000 for taxpayers filing as married separate. While non-refundable for most families, it was refundable for families with more than three children (reduced by the amount of the taxpayer's alternative minimum tax). The credit was not indexed for inflation.

=== Economic Growth and Tax Relief Reconciliation Act of 2001 (EGTRRA) ===
A number of significant changes were made to the child tax credit by the Economic Growth and Tax Relief Reconciliation Act of 2001 (EGTRRA), a signature piece of tax legislation during the George W. Bush presidency (the bill is often referred to as one of the two "Bush tax cuts"). According to Margot L. Crandall-Hollick, a specialist in public finance, the bill made four key alterations to the CTC:

1. It increased the maximum amount of the credit per child in scheduled increments until it reached $1,000 per child in 2010
2. It made the credit refundable for families irrespective of size using the earned income formula (10% of a taxpayer's earned income in excess of $10,000, up to the maximum amount of the credit for that tax year, and scheduled to increase to 15% for tax years 2005 through 2010)
3. It allowed the child tax credit to offset alternative minimum tax liability
4. It temporarily repealed the prior law provision that reduced the refundable portion of the child tax credit by the amount of the AMT

All of these provisions were scheduled to expire at the end of 2010 (restrictions imposed by the rules of budget reconciliation, a special parliamentary procedure that allows expedited passage of certain budgetary legislation, often necessitates placing time limits on budget policies, even if legislators hope they will be made permanent).

=== Adjustments to EGTRRA ===
The Jobs and Growth Tax Relief Reconciliation Act of 2003 (JGTRRA) increased the size of the CTC to $1,000 for 2003 and 2004 (under EGTRRA, the credit would not have reached $1,000 until 2010). The Working Families Tax Relief Act of 2004 extended this amount through 2010. The Tax Relief, Unemployment Insurance Reauthorization, and Job Creation Act of 2010 extended this $1,000 cap through the end of 2012. The American Taxpayer Relief Act of 2012, signed into law by President Barack Obama, made the $1,000 credit permanent.

=== Tax Cuts and Jobs Act of 2017 (TCJA) ===
The Tax Cuts and Jobs Act of 2017 (TCJA), with efforts led by Sen. Marco Rubio (R-FL) and Ivanka Trump, made three major changes to the CTC:

1. It doubled the amount per qualifying child to $2,000
2. It made up to $1,400 of the credit refundable
3. It increased income thresholds to make the CTC available to more families.

Before 2018, the full CTC was only available to single parents making less than $75,000 and families making less than $110,000 per year. The TCJA significantly increased these income thresholds to $200,000 for single parents and $400,000 for married couples filing jointly. Above these limits, the CTC is phased out at the rate of $50 for each additional $1,000 (or portion of $1,000) earned.

=== Expansion Proposals ===
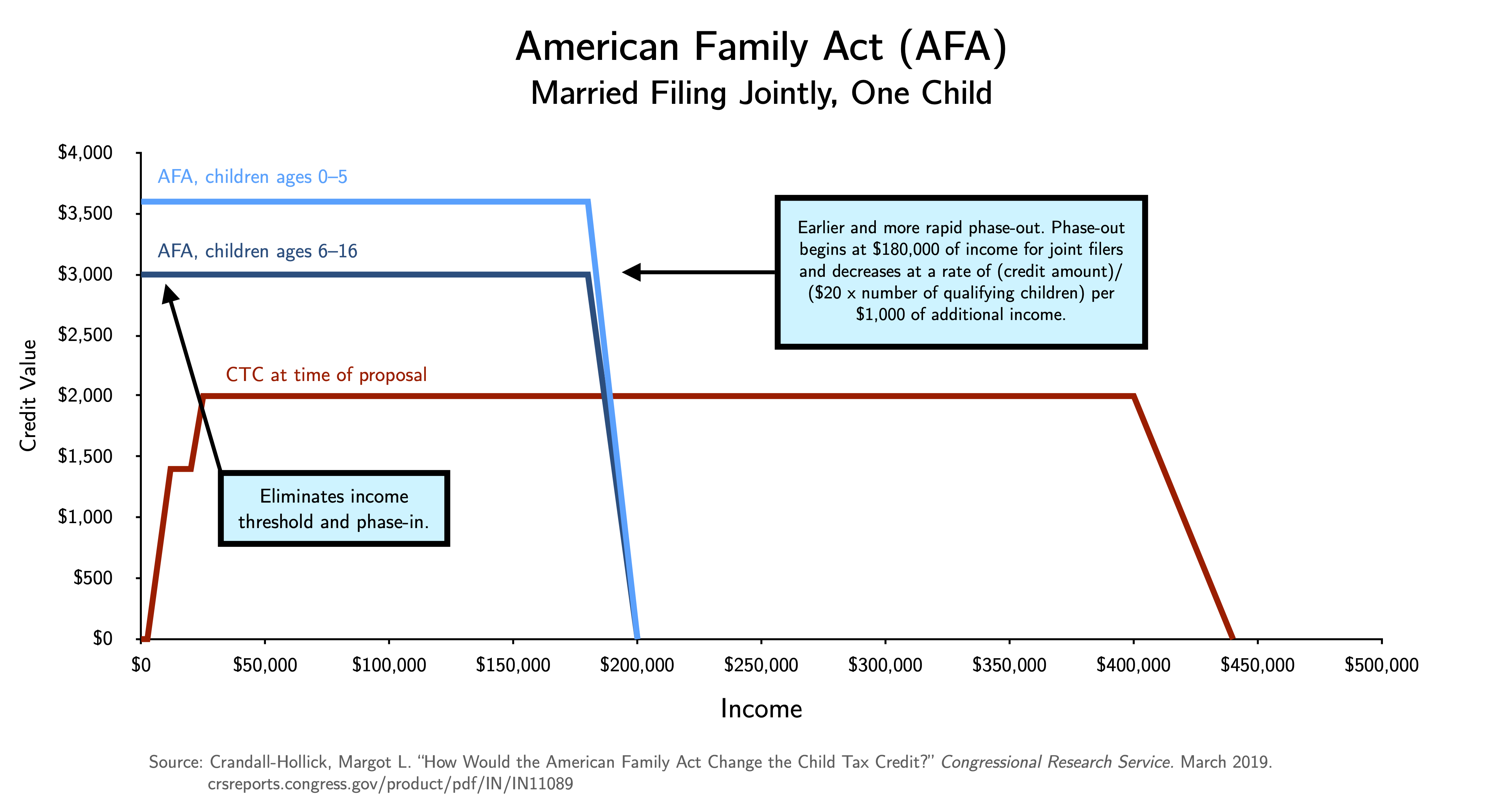
Comparison of the CTC proposed by the American Family Act of 2019 and the CTC under the Tax and Jobs Act of 2017 for a married couple filing jointly (depicts amount of credit per child)

In 2017, Democratic senators Michael Bennet and Sherrod Brown proposed the American Family Act (AFA). The bill would have increased the child tax credit's refundable portion to $3,600 per child under age six and to $3,000 per child age six to 16, eliminated the income threshold and phase-in (opening up the credit to the lowest-income families), and made the credit a monthly rather than annual benefit.

Researchers at Columbia University estimated that the AFA would have reduced child poverty by nearly half. However, with the House of Representatives and Senate under Republican control, the bill failed to advance. Bennet and Brown re-introduced a modified version of the bill in 2019, (Note: The 2019 bill would also have reduced the age of eligibility from 18 to 16, removed the requirement added by the Tax Cuts and Jobs Act of 2017 that dependents have a Social Security number to qualify for the CTC (which made non-citizen children ineligible) and raised the phase-out income threshold compared to the 2017 version of the bill (which would have lowered the phase-out income threshold, as well as increased the rate the credit phases out, compared to the CTC instituted by the Tax Cuts and Jobs Act of 2017, reducing the number of high- and upper-middle income households who could claim the credit).) this time garnering 39 co-sponsors in the Senate and 186 in the House (all Democrats), but it again failed to advance in the Republican-controlled Senate. The proposal did ultimately influence the expanded child tax credit included in the American Rescue Plan Act of 2021, however (see section below).

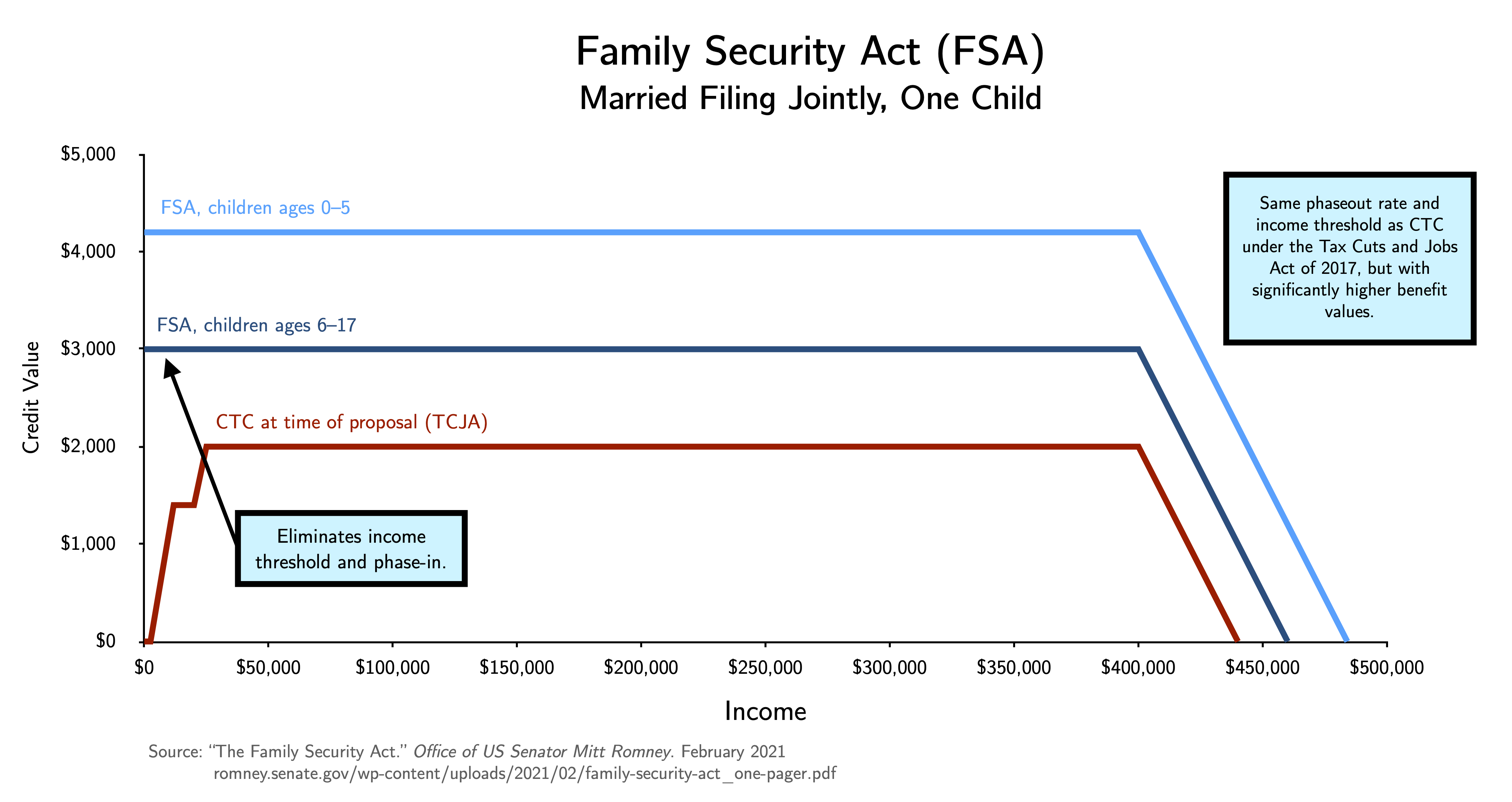
The Family Security Act. Displays benefits per child for joint filers.

The proposed inclusion of an expanded CTC in the American Rescue Plan Act (ARP) also spurred the creation of several alternative child benefit proposals. In February 2021, shortly after Joe Biden assumed the presidency and Democrats gained a narrow majority in the Senate, Republican Senator Mitt Romney released his "Family Security Act", a proposal to provide families with a yearly benefit of $3,000 per child ages 6–16 and $4,200 per child ages 0–5, with a maximum allowable benefit of $15,000 and the same phaseout structure as the CTC under the TCJA. Like the child tax credit expansion proposed in the American Family Plan and instituted by the ARP, the benefit would be delivered as monthly payments; additionally, it would also allow families to begin claiming the benefit four months before the expected birth date of their child. Unlike the Democratic proposals, Romney's plan would have the benefit administered by the Social Security Administration (SSA) rather than the Internal Revenue Service (IRS). (Note: Having the Social Security Administration (SSA) administer the benefit rather than the Internal Revenue Service (IRS) would alleviate many of the administrative problems that beleaguered the 2021 expanded child tax credit. See Administrative difficulties.) The child benefit under Romney's plan would be larger than that of the ARP (except for very large families, who would have their benefit capped under Romney's plan) and would substantially reduce child poverty, though to a lesser extent than the ARP because Romney's plan would be financed in part by substantially reducing the earned income tax credit for taxpayers with children and eliminating Temporary Assistance for Needy Families (TANF) and the Child and Dependent Care Tax Credit (as a result, the proposal would actually increase poverty among many single-parent families). Romney also proposed eliminating the state and local tax deduction (which primarily benefits wealthy households and has a negligible effect on child poverty) and the head of household tax filing status to raise revenue for the benefit.

In April 2021, Republican Senator Josh Hawley introduced a related proposal called the "Parent Tax Credit" (PTC). The PTC would have been a new, refundable tax credit of $6,000 annually for single parents with at least one child under the age 13 and $12,000 annually for married couples with at least one child under the age of 13 (the larger benefit for married couples was intended to act as a "marriage bonus"); the benefit would be paid out monthly (i.e. $500 per month for single parents and $1,000 per month for married couples). It would have had a larger income threshold than the CTC, requiring parents to make at least $7,540 in income (the equivalent of 20 hours of work per week at the federal minimum wage of $7.25 per hour) to claim the credit; it would have no income phase-out. Children would need to possess a Social Security number to qualify.

=== American Rescue Plan Act of 2021 ===
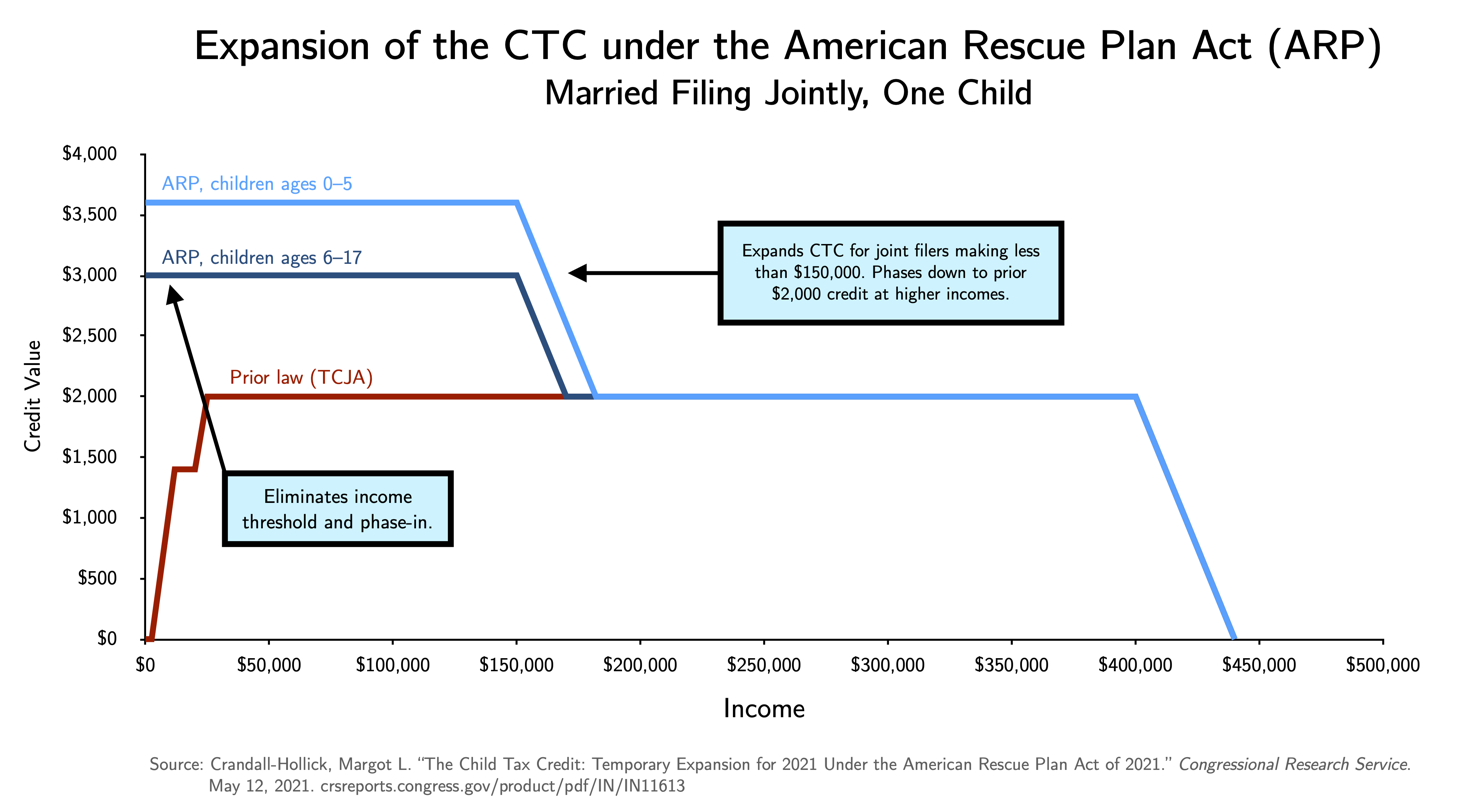
Comparison of the expanded CTC and the CTC under the Tax and Jobs Act of 2017 for a married couple filing jointly (depicts amount of credit per child)

The American Rescue Plan Act (ARP) of 2021, a stimulus bill advanced by Democratic lawmakers and signed into law by President Joe Biden in response to the economic downturn caused by the COVID-19 pandemic, expanded the child tax credit by allowing qualifying families to offset, for the 2021 tax year, $3,000 per child up to age 17 and $3,600 per child under age 6. The size of the benefit gradually diminished for single filers earning more than $75,000 per year, heads of households earning more than $112,500 per year, and married couples filing jointly making more than $150,000 a year. Additionally, it made the credit fully refundable, and half of the benefit was sent out to eligible households as monthly payments (i.e. it was delivered as 6 monthly payments + one lump-sum payment for the remaining half of the benefit). Full refundability made the full value of the credit available to lower-income families, who previously tended to receive little or no benefit.

39 million households covering 88% of children in the United States began receiving payments automatically on July 15, 2021. A Columbia University study estimated that the expanded CTC reduced child poverty by 26 percent. The expanded CTC expired on December 31, 2021.

=== Build Back Better Act and Family Security Act 2.0 ===
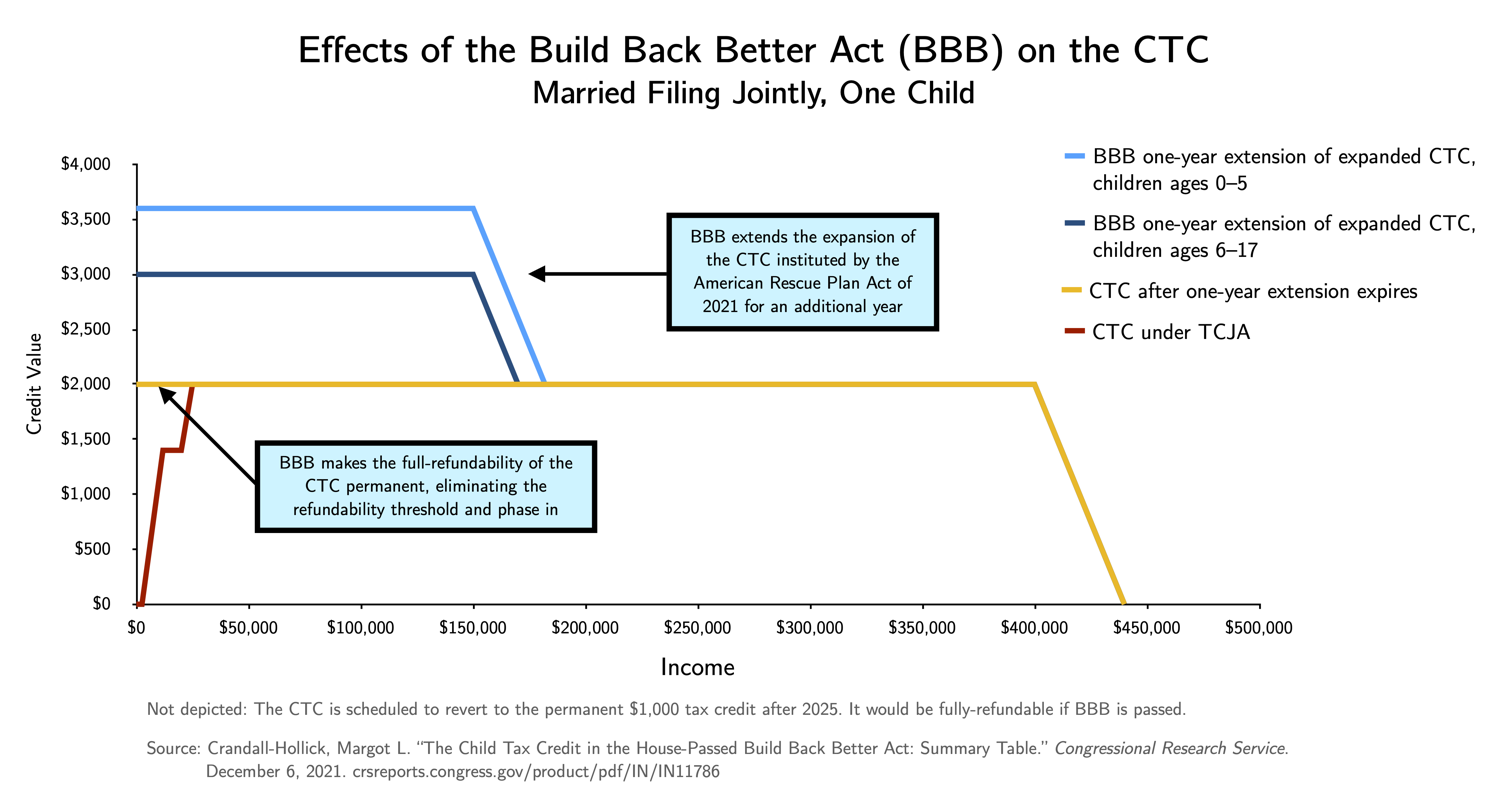
Effects of the Build Back Better Act on the child tax credit

The Build Back Better Act, passed by the House of Representatives on November 19, 2021, would extend the expansion of the CTC made by the American Rescue Plan Act of 2021 for one year. Significantly, it would also make the full-refundability of the CTC permanent (i.e. it would permanently eliminate the earned income threshold and phase-in, so that low-income families can access the full value of the credit). The bill stalled in the Senate and was ultimately replaced by the Inflation Reduction Act of 2022, which did not include an expansion to the child tax credit.

Family Security Act (FSA) 2.0

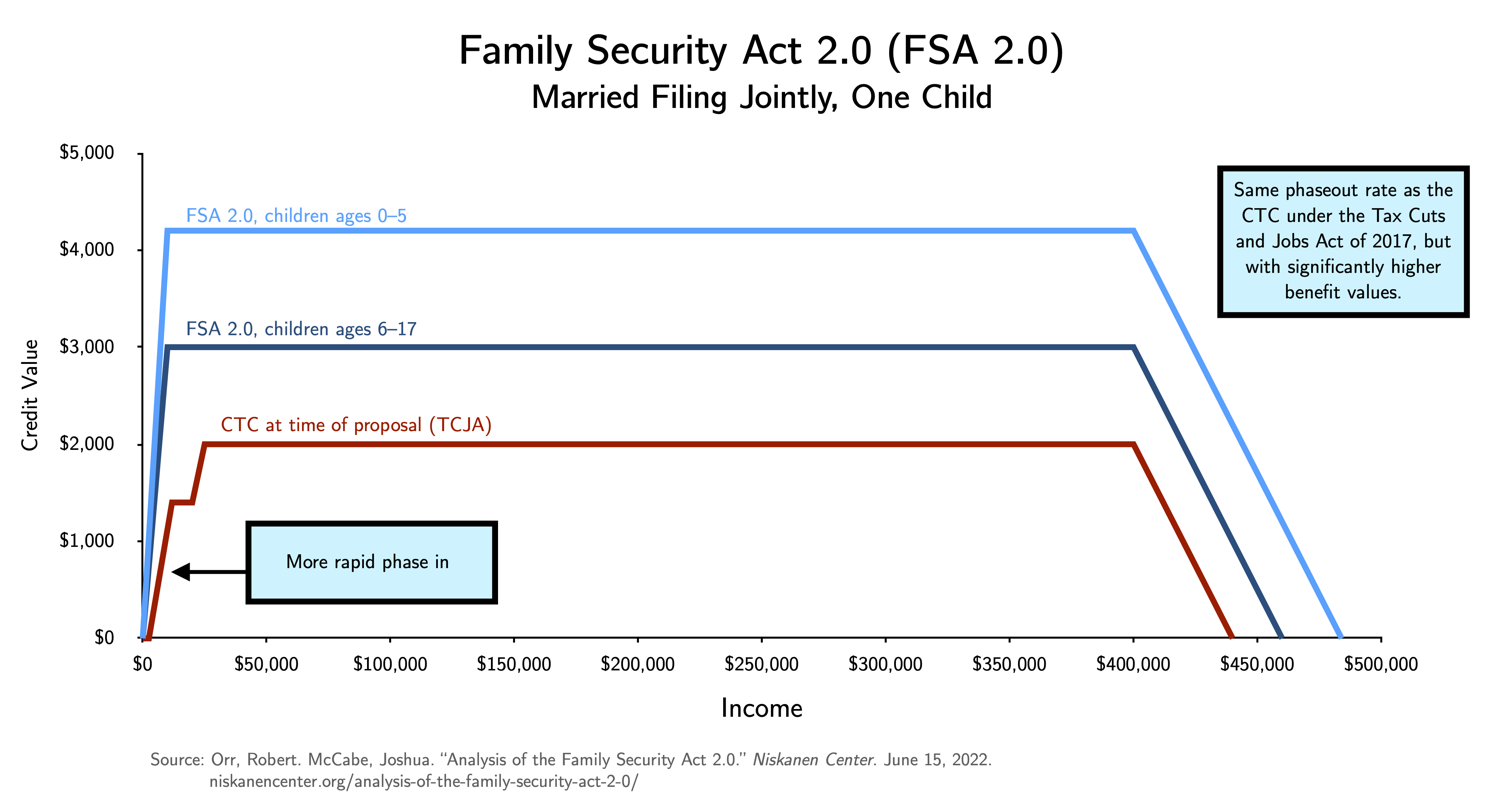
Family Security Act 2.0

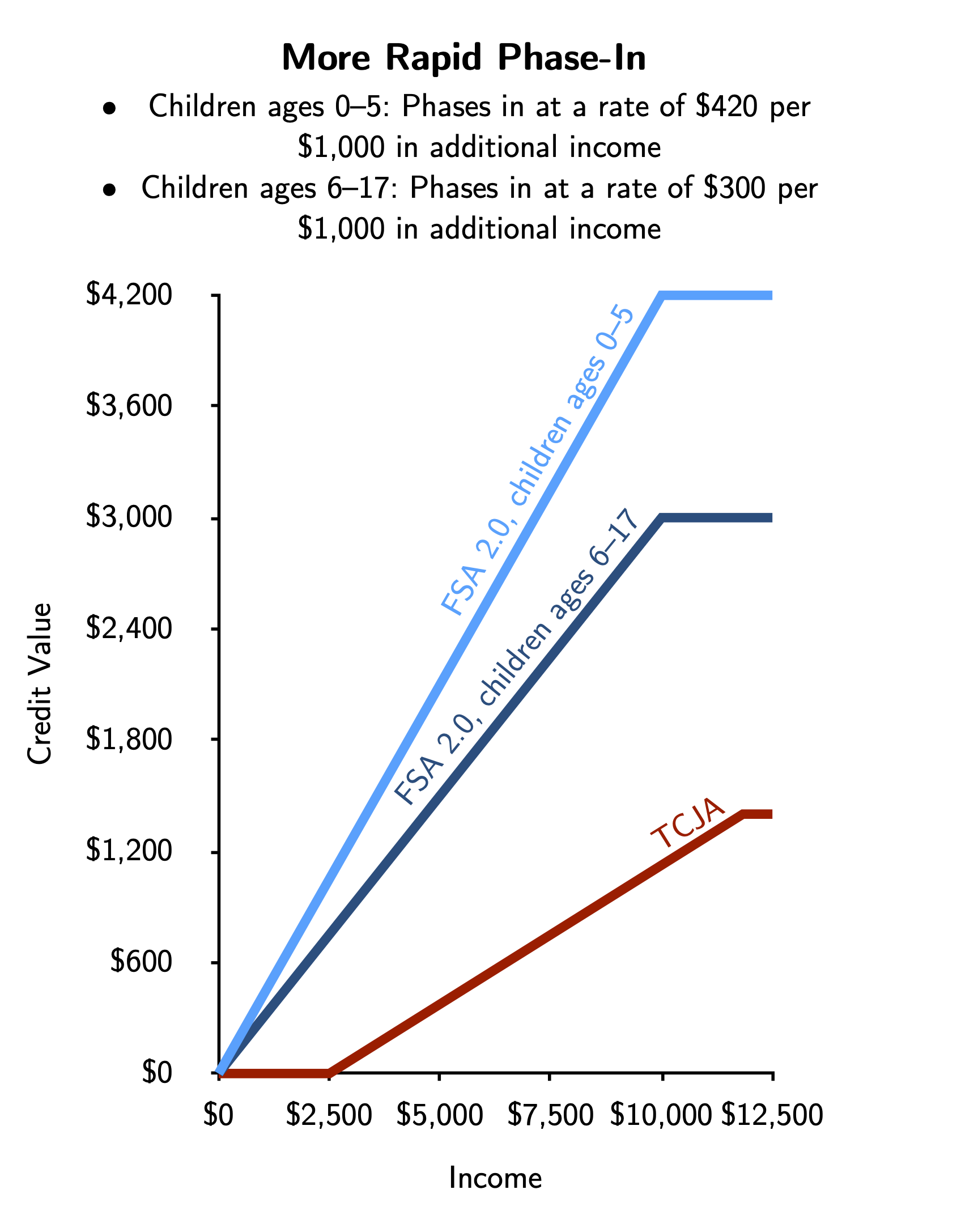
More rapid phase-in

On June 15, 2022, Senator Mitt Romney, along with Senators Richard Burr and Steve Daines, introduced the Family Security Act 2.0 (FSA 2.0), a modification of Romney's earlier plan. Like his earlier plan, the FSA 2.0 would substantially raise the child benefit relative to the existing child tax credit. However, the FSA 2.0 includes a $10,000 income phase-in (i.e. a family must make at least $10,000 to qualify for the full benefit) and retains the substantial reductions to the earned income tax credit from his earlier plan, which would result in many low and moderate income single families seeing their combined benefits cut under the plan.

== Criticism ==
=== Lower benefits for low-income people ===
The child tax credit has been criticized for excluding low income-families—who are in most desperate need of financial assistance and who reap the largest relative gain in income from the benefit—from obtaining the full benefit or even any of the benefit. Under the current CTC, very low-income families making less than $2,500 receive no benefit and low-income families with incomes above $2,500 are subjected to a 15% phase-in. As a result, about one-in-five families with eligible children have incomes too low to receive the full credit. Furthermore, according to Columbia University's Center on Poverty and Social Policy, over 50% of black and Hispanic children are in families with incomes too low to receive the full benefit and nearly 1-in-5 black children are in families with incomes too low to receive any of the credit.

Excluding the poorest families from the full benefit substantially reduces the poverty alleviation effects of the CTC: the Jain Family Institute, for instance, estimates that making the child tax credit fully refundable—without any change to benefit levels—would reduce child poverty by 19%.

=== Complexity ===
Child tax credit complexity

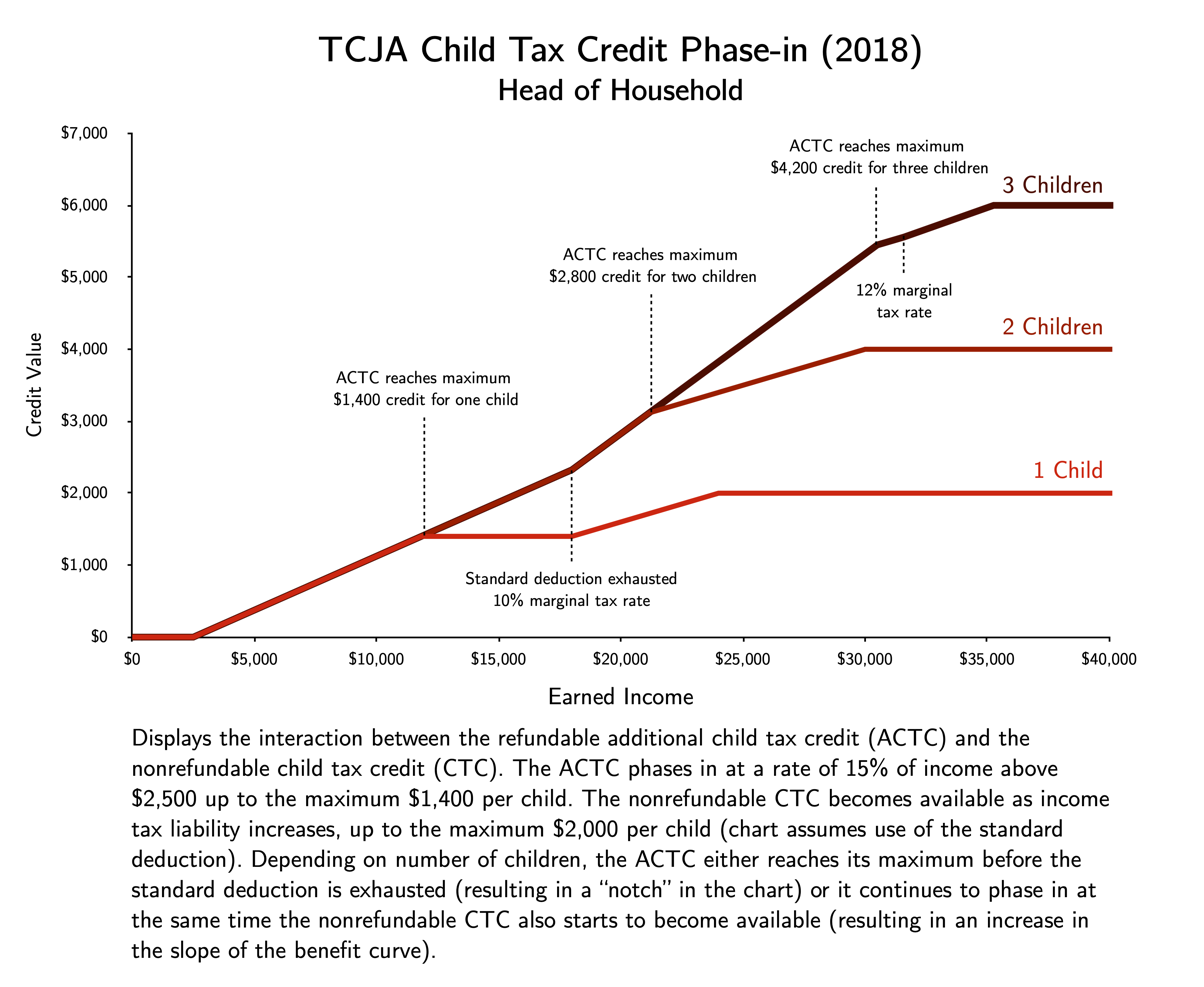
The interaction between the refundable additional child tax credit and nonrefundable child tax credit can be confusing to taxpayers.

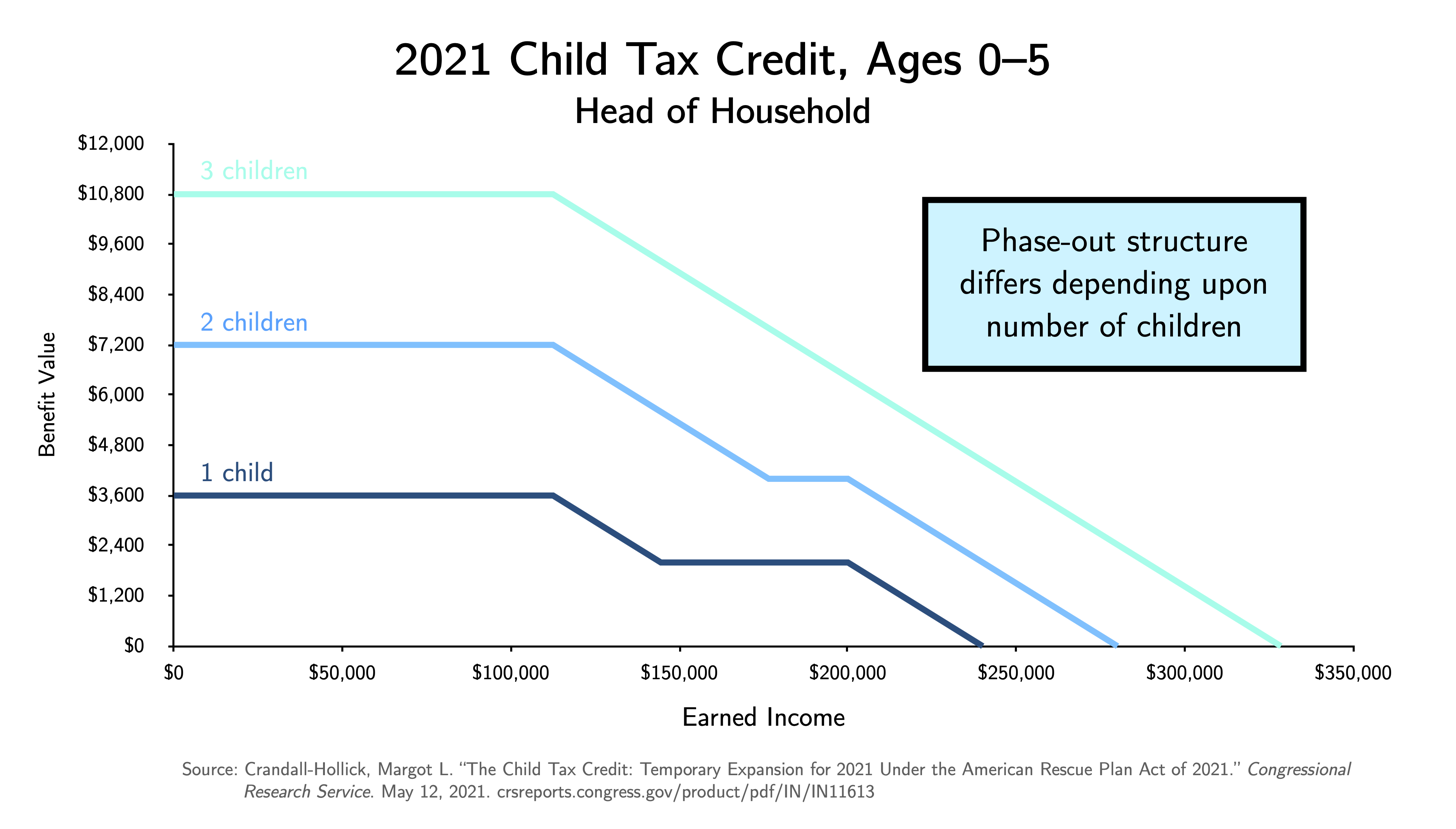
The phase-out structure of the 2021 expanded child tax credit can be confusing to taxpayers.

The child tax credit has been criticized for its complexity. In many countries, a simple monthly child allowance is sent to all families. In the United States, by contrast, the CTC has a complicated structure: it includes an income threshold, a phase-in formula, a separate phase-out formula, and mixes reduction of tax liability with direct payments. The 2021 expansion scrapped the income threshold and phase-in, but has a more complicated phase-out structure: it first phases down to a $2,000 plateau and then at higher incomes phases down to $0; the phase-out structure also differs depending on the number of qualifying children (see chart).

The CTC also interacts with other tax credits in ways that may be confusing to claimers. Many families can simultaneously claim the child tax credit, the earned income tax credit and the child and dependent care tax credit—each with its own set of eligibility rules—and may find it difficult to understand how these programs interact with each other or even which programs they are eligible for. The large number of tax benefits also makes tax forms long and confusing. According to the US Treasury:

[E]ligibility rules for refundable credits are complex and lead to high improper payment rates...[R]ules differ by credit and are complex because they must address complicated family relationships and residency arrangements to determine eligibility...The complexity of the rules causes taxpayers to erroneously claim the credits. Much of the complexity that leads to errors stems from claims involving qualifying children. This is because of the intricacy of the rules regarding who can claim a child in instances of divorce, separation, and three-generation families. The complexity of these rules increases compliance burden for taxpayers and administrative costs for the IRS...Our analysis of EITC and ACTC eligibility rules found that the qualifying child relationship rules are difficult to understand. In addition, the definition of key eligibility requirements is different between the two credits. This can cause confusion for taxpayers when trying to determine which credit(s) they are eligible to claim.

=== Administered through tax code ===
The child tax credit is a tax expenditure, i.e. a social benefit administered through the tax code. Accordingly, it is delivered as most tax breaks are: as a reduction in the amount of taxes a taxpayer owes to the government or, for the refundable portion, as a lump-sum payment delivered at the end of the tax year (the temporary expansion of the CTC for the year 2021, however, allowed beneficiaries to receive half of the CTC as a series of six monthly payments, with the other half delivered as a lump-sum payment at the end of 2021). A number of scholars and political commentators have argued that a monthly child allowance (a simple direct cash payment to parents) would be more effective than the CTC at easing the costs of childcare and reducing child poverty.

One reason for this focuses on the Internal Revenue Service's (IRS) inability to deliver benefits to all eligible households, particularly low-income households. This became especially acute during the temporary expansion of the CTC in 2021, which made the lowest income families eligible for the full benefit for the first time (prior to the change, the CTC had an income threshold and phase-in, so administrative problems affecting low-income families were less substantial for the simple reason that many low-income families were ineligible for the benefit). To determine eligibility, the IRS uses taxpayers' tax returns. Many low-income households, however, are not required to file tax returns. As a result, many eligible low-income families may not receive the CTC despite being eligible for it.

The IRS attempted to remedy this by offering an online non-filer sign-up tool. However, that, too, has been criticized. It was derided for being poorly designed: the website, designed in conjunction with Intuit through the Free File Alliance, was not mobile friendly, contained little indication that it was an official government portal (it used a .com rather than .gov domain name, for instance), and was only available in English. To log in to the website, users faced a number of requirements that ordinary taxpayers do not have to satisfy when filing their tax returns, including providing an email address, receiving a log-in code on their phone, scanning a photo ID, and taking a picture of themselves with a computer or smartphone (which is run through facial recognition software)—all administrative burdens that make completing the online form more difficult, particularly for low-income families. (The Biden White House collaborated later that year with Code for America to create a more accessible website). Critics also noted that relying on non-filers to sign up online fails to accommodate people without access to the internet, which especially impacts low-income people (according to the Department of Health and Human Services (HHS), more than one in six people in poverty do not have internet access in their home)—precisely the group that is most likely not to file and the group that reaps the greatest relative gain in income from the refundable CTC.

== See also ==
- Canada Child Benefit
- Earned Income Tax Credit
- Social programs in the United States
- Tax expenditure
- Temporary Assistance for Needy Families
- Tax Relief for American Families and Workers Act
