= Tax expenditure =

US Government spending through the tax code

Tax expenditures are government revenue losses from tax exclusions, exemptions, deductions, credits, deferrals, and preferential tax rates. They are a counterpart to direct expenditures, in that they both are forms of government spending.

Tax expenditures function as subsidies for certain activities, they effect both axis of equity of the basic tax system by giving preferential treatment to those activities. For instance, two people who have the same income can have different effective tax rates if one of the tax payers qualifies for certain tax expenditures by owning a home, having children, or receiving employer-provided health care and pension insurance.

== Definition ==
The Congressional Budget and Impoundment Control Act of 1974 (CBA) defines tax expenditures as "those revenue losses attributable to provisions of the Federal tax laws which allow a special credit, a preferential rate of tax, or a deferral of tax liability".

The term was coined in 1967 by Stanley S. Surrey, a renowned tax scholar and former Assistant Secretary of the Treasury. Surrey created the term to characterize the political use of tax breaks to enact social policies that would ordinarily be accomplished through direct expenditures. He claimed that Congress were utilitising the policies as "vast subsidy apparatus to reward favored constituencies or subsidize narrow policy areas."

A related concept from the British tax literature is "Fiscal welfare" as proposed by Richard Titmuss in the 1950s. However, this tends to only refer to policies to benefit individuals and not corporations.

== Overview ==
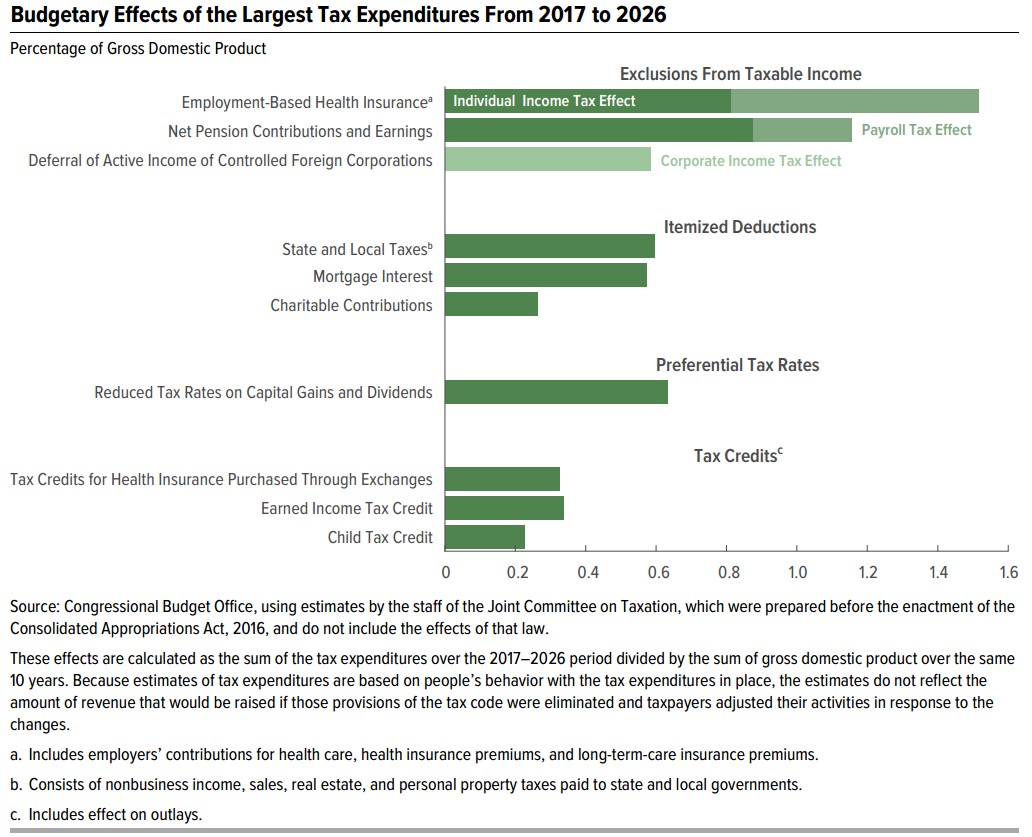
Budgetary effects of largest tax expenditures 2017 to 2026, as an average annual percent of GDP

As of fiscal year 2020, the United States Treasury lists over 160 tax expenditures, the majority for private social benefits and services like employee-provided healthcare.

Tax expenditures are also common in other countries.

=== Size of expenditures ===
The cost of tax expenditures varies from year to year with the level of economic activity, though changes tend to be modest. The Congressional Budget Office (CBO) estimated that U.S. tax expenditures in fiscal year 2019 totaled $1.6 trillion (7.8% of gross domestic product). This was larger than all discretionary spending ($1.3 trillion) and was equal to nearly half of all federal revenue ($3.5 trillion). The CBO has also estimated the size of major tax expenditures on federal receipts as an annual average percent of GDP, for the period of 2016 to 2026. These included, among others:

- Exclusions from income: Employment based health insurance (1.5% GDP) and pension contributions (1.2% GDP)
- Deductions from income: State and local taxes (0.6% GDP) and mortgage interest (0.6% GDP)
- Preferential (lower) tax rates: Capital gains and dividends (0.6% GDP)
- Tax credits: Earned income tax credit (0.3% GDP)

The CBO projected that the top 10 largest tax expenditures would average 6.2% of GDP each year on average over the 2016–2026 period. For scale, federal tax receipts averaged around 18% GDP from 1970 to 2016. The CBO analysis does not account for behavioral changes that might occur if the tax policies were changed, so the actual revenue impact could differ from the amounts indicated.

=== Distribution of benefits ===
Existing tax expenditures disproportionally benefit those with high incomes. While certain tax programs like the earned income tax credit are targeted to people with lower incomes, according to the Center on Budget and Policy Priorities (CBPP) in 2013 the top 1% of U.S. households by income received approximately 17% of all tax expenditure spending and the top 20% received 51%.

Similarly, in 2016 the Congressional Budget Office (CBO) reported that:

Tax expenditures are distributed unevenly across the income scale. When measured in dollars, much more of the tax expenditures go to higher-income households than to lower-income households. As a percentage of people’s income, tax expenditures are greater for the highest-income and lowest-income households than for households in the middle of the income distribution.

== Politics ==
Tax expenditures are considered "off-budget" spending by most economists and budget experts. Tax expenditures are easier to pass through Congress than increases in appropriations spending. They are easily seen as free benefits, when government grants are viewed as giveaways. Unlike direct spending, tax spending must only pass through two committees, the House Ways and Means and Senate Finance. Tax expenditure programs, once in the tax code, do not come up for annual review and can only be removed through tax legislation. Tax expenditure programs are a form of entitlement spending in that every tax payer that qualifies can claim government money. Faricy (2011) demonstrated that when tax expenditures are counted as a type of government spending, Democratic and Republican parties are indistinguishable in annual changes to federal government spending. This study also found that Republicans are more likely to increase tax expenditures when in control of government thereby subsidizing the activities of businesses and the wealthy. Jacob Hacker (2002) shows that the federal subsidization of private health insurance has grown over the years and has made efforts for nationalized health care more difficult. Ellis and Faricy (2011) find that when tax expenditures rise, public opinion adjusts and becomes more liberal to counteract the conservative policies.

== Effects ==
Partial exemption of the poor from taxation through reliance on progressive income taxes rather than sales taxes for revenue or tax rebates such as the earned income tax credit loosely correlate with socio-economic mobility in the United States with areas which tax the poor heavily such as the Deep South showing lower mobility than those with generous tax expenditures for the benefit of low income families with children.
