= Stanley S. Surrey =

Tax law scholar

Stanley S. Surrey (October 3, 1910 – August 27, 1984) was a United States tax law scholar known as "a dean of the academic tax bar" and "the greatest tax scholar of his generation". Among his notable contributions to the field was the phrase "tax expenditure", which he coined in a 1967 speech to refer to tax breaks that serve as government subsidies unrelated to attempts to accurately measure the tax base.

== Career ==
Surrey graduated from the City College of New York in 1929 and from Columbia University Law School in 1932.

Following graduation, Surrey joined the New Deal administration and worked in the National Recovery Administration in Washington D.C. from 1933 to 1935 and at the National Labor Relations Board from 1935 to 1937. Interrupted by a stint in the Navy, Surrey then served at the Treasury Department until 1947. He then became a law professor at Boalt Hall law school at the University of California at Berkeley. During 1949 and 1950, Surrey was a member of the American Tax Mission to Japan, tasked with developing a new tax system for Japan following World War II. In the spring of 1950, Surrey accepted a post as law professor at Harvard Law School. He left Harvard Law School to serve as Assistant Secretary of the Treasury for Tax Policy from 1961 to 1969, then rejoined the Harvard faculty. At the time of his death in 1984, he was retired as the Jeremiah Smith Professor of Law at Harvard and was serving as a visiting professor at Boston College Law School.

Surrey's projects and appointments included serving as chief reporter for the Income Tax Project of the American Law Institute, founding the International Program in Taxation at Harvard, serving as president of the National Tax Association in 1979 and 1980. He was also a fellow of the American Academy of Arts and Sciences. He was widely involved in the creation of international tax systems and served as an adviser at the United Nations on international tax projects.

== Publications ==
His publications included a casebook he co-authored with William C. Warren, entitled "Federal Income Taxation: Cases and Materials." He also published the book "Pathways to Tax Reform" in 1973 and was the co-author of "Tax Expenditures" in 1985 and "Federal Taxation, Wealth Transfer: Cases and Materials" in 1987. Throughout his career, he wrote a significant number of major tax articles in several law review publications, especially the Harvard Law Review. In total, he published 20 books and 97 articles throughout his career.
