= Tax Relief for American Families and Workers Act =

US congressional bill amending the Internal Revenue Code

Tax Relief for American Families and Workers Act of 2024
- Long title: To make improvements to the child tax credit, to provide tax incentives to promote economic growth, to provide special rules for the taxation of certain residents of Taiwan with income from sources within the United States, to provide tax relief with respect to certain Federal disasters, to make improvements to the low-income housing tax credit, and for other purposes.
- Enacted by: the 118th United States Congress

Legislative history
- Introduced in the House of Representatives as H.R. 7024 by Jason Smith (R–TX) on January 17, 2024; Committee consideration by House Ways and Means; Passed the House on January 31, 2024 (357-70)

The Tax Relief for American Families and Workers Act of 2024 is a tax bill in the 118th United States Congress (H.R. 7024) that would amend portions of the Internal Revenue Code of 1986. The bill was approved by the House of Representatives on January 31, 2024, by a bipartisan vote 357–70.

== Provisions ==
The Tax Relief for American Families and Workers Act is a $78 billion package that would expand the Child Tax Credit (a tax benefit that provides money to parents), restore business tax breaks, increase federal funding for states to encourage the development of low-income housing, deepen economic ties between the United States and Taiwan and end a pandemic-era employer tax benefit. Key elements of the bill include:

=== Child Tax Credit expansion ===
The bill would increase payments to low-income families who meet a minimum income threshold. It would also increase the $2,000-per-child maximum credit to keep up with inflation and would let families choose when calculating the size of the credit between their current year's income or the previous year's. This provision also would increase the maximum refundable credit from:

- $1,600 per child to $1,800 per child in tax year 2023,
- $1,700 per child to $1,900 per child in tax year 2024,
- $1,800 per child to $2,000 per child in tax year 2025.

The expansion of the Child Tax Credit is expected to cost around $33.5 billion over three years.

=== Corporate tax breaks ===
The bill aims to restore corporate tax breaks ushered in by the Tax Cuts and Jobs Act of 2017 that had either expired or were set to expire in the next years. Among these corporate tax breaks that the bill restores are:

- Immediate deductions for domestic research and development costs.
- Full and immediate deductions for capital expenses (like new factories and equipment).
- Easing limitations on deducting interest expenses.
- Raise the threshold for businesses to report payments to some contractors and subcontractors.

Reinstating the tax benefits for businesses is projected to cost $32.8 billion over a decade.

=== Affordable housing ===
The legislation would authorize a 12.5% increase for the federal Low-Income Housing Tax Credit. This federal credit originally meant to subsidize up to 70 percent of construction of low-income housing units, and it is generally reserved for the development of new properties that do not use other federal subsidies. To support affordable housing, the bill lowers the proportion of a building that must be financed by municipal bonds to qualify for the credit from 50 percent to 30 percent for its developer. The measures are estimated to cost $6.2 billion over 10 years.

=== Taiwan tax modifications ===
The legislation would end double taxation between the United States and Taiwan by amending portions of the tax code to align the tax treatment of income from U.S. sources that is earned or received by qualified residents of Taiwan with the treatment that is typically offered by the United States under bilateral tax treaties. These provisions would take effect only after Taiwan provides comparable tax relief for income from Taiwanese sources that is earned or received by U.S. residents.

The bill would authorize the President to negotiate with and enter into one or more tax agreements with Taiwan to provide tax relief beyond that provided by ending double taxation.

=== Disaster relief ===
This provision would provide tax relief to some individual taxpayers affected by federally declared disasters, with a special focus on providing East Palestine disaster relief payments. Specifically, the bill would allow casualty loss deductions for disasters occurring from January 1, 2020, through the date of enactment to be taken on tax returns without itemizing deductions and without the typical reduction of $100 per casualty loss and 10 percent of adjusted gross income.

=== Ending employment credit ===
In order to pay for the cost of the tax bill, a provision was included to halt the Employee Retention Credit, a pandemic-era employer tax benefit that cost the federal government billions more than had been projected and has been considered as a magnet for fraud. The employee retention credit, created in 2020 and expanded in 2021, was intended to encourage companies that were struggling during the pandemic to keep employees on their payrolls.

The elimination of this program is expected to produce savings of $78 billion, covering the cost of other provisions of the bill.

== Legislative history ==
=== Committee vote ===
Committee vote
Party	Yes	No	Not voting
Republican	25	—N/a	—N/a
Democratic	15	3	—N/a
Percentage	93%	7%	—N/a
Total votes	✓ 40	3	0

Representative Jason Smith (R‑MO 8th), Chair of House Ways and Means Committee partnered with Senator Ron Wyden (D‑OR), Chair of the Senate Finance Committee, to craft legislation. Both led intensive rounds of discussions with the goal of striking a compromise on tax policy and enact it in time for the start of tax filing season in January. The House Ways and Means Committee approved the package on January 26, with an overwhelming bipartisan vote, 40 in favor and 3 against. All Republicans on the committee voted in favor of the bill, and only three Democrats dissented.

=== House vote ===
House vote
Party	Yes	No	Not voting
Republican	169	47	3
Democratic	188	23	2
Percentage	83.6%	16.4%	—N/a
Total votes	✓ 357	70	5

The $78 billion tax package was passed the House on a vote of 357 to 70, with strong support from both Republicans and Democrats. Moderates from both parties provided the tax deal with the two-thirds majority it needed to pass the House under an expedited procedure known as suspension of the rules. Some Republicans on the right opposed the bill due to what they saw as an expansion of the welfare state in disguise. They were joined by some House progressives that voted against the package, who argued that the bill wouldn't do enough to slash child poverty.

=== Senate vote ===
Senate vote
Party	Yes	No	Not voting
Democratic	45	3	3
Republican	3	41	5
Percentage	52.2%	47.8%	—N/a
Total votes	48	✗ 44	8

The bill was sent to the Senate, where some Senate Republicans called for hearings and others showed interest to make changes in the bill.

On August 1, the bill was blocked in a 44-48 procedural vote in the Senate. The procedural motion to limit debate on the package required 60% of votes in favor to succeed. The big majority of Republicans, one Democrat and two independent voted against the procedural motion while the vast majority of Democrats and three Republicans voted in favour. Some Republican senators recognized that electoral politics played a role in the bill's defeat.

== Aftermath ==
In January 2025, Ways and Means Chair Jason Smith (R‑MO 8th), the lead negotiator of the Tax Relief for American Families and Workers Act of 2024, implied that most corporate tax provisions in the bill would be included in the upcoming reconciliation package in the 119th Congress.

Additionally, Smith criticized Senate Republicans for not passing his bill given that bonus depreciation, R&D expensing, and interest deductions would no longer be part of the budget baseline for tax reform legislation in reconciliation. Smith argued that the passage of his bill would have prevented $500 billion in corporate tax cuts from being added to the upcoming reconciliation package over ten years.

In the 119th Congress, Smith introduced H.R. 33 a bill with original provisions from the Tax Relief for American Families and Workers Act of 2024 related to Taiwan. The bill was sent to the Senate after passing the House of Representatives on January 15, 2025, on a 423-1 vote. Smith combined the United States-Taiwan Expedited Double-Tax Relief Act and the United States-Taiwan Tax Agreement Authorization Act into a single bill designed to prevent double taxation between the U.S. and Taiwan and authorize the U.S. president "to negotiate and enter into a tax agreement relative to Taiwan."
