= Tax credit =

Tax incentive

A tax credit is a tax incentive which allows certain taxpayers to subtract the amount of the credit they have accrued from the total they owe the state. It may also be a credit granted in recognition of taxes already paid or a form of state "discount" applied in certain cases. Another way to think of a tax credit is as a rebate.

== Refundable vs. non-refundable ==
A refundable tax credit is one which, if the credit exceeds the taxes due, the government pays back to the taxpayer the difference. In other words, it makes possible a negative tax liability. For example, if a taxpayer has an initial tax liability of $100 and applies a $300 tax credit, then the taxpayer ends with a liability of –$200 and the government refunds to the taxpayer that $200.

With a non-refundable tax credit, if the credit exceeds the taxes due then the taxpayer pays nothing but does not receive the difference. In this case, the taxpayer from the example would end with a tax liability of $0 (i.e. they could make use of only $100 of the $300 credit) and the government would not refund the taxpayer the $200 difference.

== Credit for payments ==
Many systems refer to taxes paid indirectly, such as taxes withheld by payers of income, as credits rather than prepayments. In such cases, the tax credit is invariably refundable. The most common forms of such amounts are payroll withholding of income tax or PAYE, withholding of tax at source on payments to nonresidents, and input credits for value added tax.

== Individual income tax credits ==
Income tax systems often grant a variety of credits to individuals. These typically include credits available to all taxpayers as well as tax credits unique to individuals. Some credits may be offered for a single year only.

=== Low income subsidies ===
Several income tax systems provide income subsidies to lower income individuals by way of credit. These credits may be based on income, family status, work status, or other factors. Often such credits are refundable when total credits exceed tax liability.

==== United Kingdom ====
In the United Kingdom, "Tax Credits" were a form of means-tested support payment. They bear no connection to the amount of tax paid by the recipient and could be paid to those who pay no tax at all. The Child Tax Credit and Working Tax Credit were paid directly into the claimant's bank account or Post Office Card Account. In exceptional circumstances, these can be paid by cashcheque (sometimes called giro). However, payments may stop if account details are not provided. A minimum level of Child Tax Credits is payable to all individuals or couples with children, up to a certain income limit. The actual amount of Child Tax Credits that a person may receive depended on these factors: the level of their income, the number of children they have, whether the children are receiving Disability Living Allowance and the education status of any children over sixteen years of age. Since 2018, Child Tax Credit has been replaced by Universal Credit for most people.

Working Tax Credit is paid to single low earners with or without children who are aged 25 or over and are working over 30 hours per week and also to couples without children, at least one of whom is over 25, provided that at least one of them is working for 30 hours a week. If the claimant has children they could claim Working Tax Credit from age sixteen and up, provided that they are working at least sixteen hours per week.

Tax Credits were capped which many sources claimed affects the poorest families disproportionately. A survey by End Child Poverty estimated that roughly 1.5 million parents have reduced spending on basics like food and fuel. According to Gavin Kelly of the Resolution Foundation, tax credits help raise living standards of low paid workers. He wrote in the New Statesman, "Perhaps the biggest misconception is the voguish notion that if tax credits are cut, employers will somehow decide to offer pay rises to fill the gap. This is saloon-bar economics espoused by some on both left and right."

On 15 September 2015, the House of Commons voted to decrease Tax Credit thresholds, a law that came into effect on 6 April 2016. Opponents claimed that it would harm those on low incomes. Simon Hopkins, Chief Executive of charity Turn2us commented "Today's vote in the House of Commons will mean one thing for many of the poorest working families in the UK; they are going to get poorer. Tax credits are a vital source of income for those on a low wage and for many they make up a substantial portion of their monthly income."

The IFS supported the opposition view that the effects of the changes would disproportionately reduce the income of poor families, even taking into account reductions in income tax and an increase in the National Living Wage. The government responded that the tax credit system had, for too long, been used to subsidise low pay and the changes would bring total expenditure on tax credits back down to more sustainable levels seen in 2007–08.

On 26 October 2015 the House of Lords supported a motion from Baroness Meacher delaying the imposition of the cuts until a new consideration of the effects could be made by the House of Commons.

The tax credit system ended on 5 April 2025. No new claims can be made and no more payments will be made.

==== United States ====
The U.S. system grants the following low income tax credits:

- Earned income tax credit: this refundable credit is granted for a percentage of income earned by a low income individual. The credit is calculated and capped based on the number of qualifying children, if any. This credit is indexed for inflation and phased out for incomes above a certain amount. For 2016, the maximum credit was $6,269 for taxpayers with three or more qualifying children.
- Credit for the elderly and disabled: a nonrefundable credit of $3,750 to $7,500 as of 2025.
- Retirement savings contribution credit: a nonrefundable credit of up to 50% for up to $2000 of contributions to qualified retirement savings plans, such as IRAs (including the Roth, SEP and IRA), 401(k)/403(b)/457 plans and the Thrift Savings Plan; phased out starting (for the 2014 tax year) at incomes above $18,000 for single returns, $27,000 for heads of household, and $36,000 for joint returns.
- Mortgage interest credit: a nonrefundable credit that may be limited to $2,000, granted under specific mortgage programs.
- Premium tax credit: this refundable credit is provided to individuals and families who obtain healthcare insurance policies through a healthcare exchange, and whose income falls between 100% and 400% of the applicable federal poverty line. It was first introduced in the 2014 tax year.

==== Canada ====
There are several different types of income tax credits offered in Canada:

- Canada Child Benefit: A tax-free monthly payment for families raising children under 18.
- Canada Caregiver Credit: A non-refundable credit for supporting a spouse, common-law partner, or dependant with a physical or mental impairment.
- Canada Workers Benefit: A refundable credit for low-income workers.
- Disability Tax Credit: A non-refundable tax credit that helps people with disabilities, or their supporting family member, reduce the amount of income tax they may have to pay.
- Canada Training Credit: A refundable tax credit available to help Canadians with the cost of eligible training fees.
- Home Accessibility Tax Credit: A non-refundable tax credit to help with the cost of making a person's home accessible.
- Medical Expense Tax Credit: A non-refundable tax credit that a person can claim for themselves, their spouse or common-law partner, or other dependants, including their children or their spouse's or common law's children.

=== Family relief ===
Some systems grant tax credits for families with children. These credits may be on a per child basis or as a credit for child care expenses.

The U.S. system offers the following nonrefundable family related income tax credits (in addition to a tax deduction for each dependent child):

- Child credit: Parents of children who are under age 17 at the end of the tax year may qualify for a credit up to $1,000 per qualifying child. The credit is a dollar-for-dollar reduction of tax liability, and may be listed on Line 51 of Form 1040. For every $1,000 of adjusted gross income above the threshold limit ($110,000 for married joint filers; $75,000 for single filers), the amount of the credit decreases by $50.
- Child and dependent care credit: Taxpayers may claim a credit up to $3,000 of eligible expenses for dependent care for a child under age 13 in order to pursue or maintain gainful employment. If one parent stays home full-time, however, no child care costs are eligible for the credit.
- Credit for adoption expenses: a credit up to $10,000, phased out at higher incomes. Taxpayers who have incurred qualified adoption expenses in 2011 may claim either a $13,360 credit against tax owed or a $13,360 income exclusion if the taxpayer has received payments or reimbursements from their employer for adoption expenses.

=== Education, energy and other subsidies ===
Some systems indirectly subsidize education and similar expenses through tax credits.

The U.S. system has the following nonrefundable credits:

- Two mutually exclusive credits for qualified tuition and related expenses. The American Opportunity Tax Credit is 100% of the first $2,000 and 25% of the next $4000 of qualified tuition expenses per year for up to two years. The Lifetime Learning Credit is 20% of the first $10,000 of cumulative expenses. These credits are phased out at incomes above $50,000 ($100,000 for joint returns) in 2009. Expenses for which a credit is claimed are not eligible for tax deduction.
- First time homebuyers credit up to $7,500 (closing date before Sept. 30, 2010).
- Credits for purchase of certain nonbusiness energy property and residential energy efficiency. Several credits apply with differing rules.

== Business tax credits ==
Many systems offer various incentives for businesses to make investments in property or operate in particular areas. Credits may be offered against income or property taxes, and are generally nonrefundable to the extent they exceed taxes otherwise due. The credits may be offered to individuals as well as entities. The nature of the credits available varies highly by jurisdiction.

=== United States ===
U.S. income tax has numerous nonrefundable business credits. In most cases, any amount of these credits in excess of current year tax may be carried forward to offset future taxes, with limitations. The credits include the following (for a full list see section 38 of the Internal Revenue Code):

- Alternative motor vehicle credit: several credits are available for purchase of varying types of non-gasoline powered vehicles.
- Alternative fuel credits: a credit based on the amount of production of certain non-petroleum fuels.
- Disaster relief credits
- Credits for employing individuals in certain areas or those formerly on welfare or in targeted groups
- Credit for Increasing Research Activities
- A variety of industry specific credits

Many sub-Federal jurisdictions (states, counties, cities, etc.) within the U.S. offer income or property tax credits for particular activities or expenditures. Examples include credits similar to the Federal research and employment credits, property tax credits, (often called abatements), granted by cities for building facilities within the city, etc. These items often are negotiated between a business and a governmental body, and specific to a particular business and property.

==== Federal nonrefundable investment tax credits ====
Tax credits, while they come in many forms, are authorized incentives under the Internal Revenue Code (and some state tax codes) to implement public policy. Congress, in an effort to encourage the private sector to provide a public benefit, allows a participating taxpayer a dollar for dollar reduction of their tax liability for investments in projects that probably would not occur but for the credits.

Film incentives have proven to be incredibly valuable to productions, and have played a key role in determining where productions are completed.

==== Federal Historic Rehabilitation Tax Credit ====
The legislative incentive program to encourage the preservation of "historical buildings". Congress instituted a two-tier Tax Credit incentive under the Tax Reform Act of 1986. A 20% credit is available for the rehabilitation of historical buildings and a 10% credit is available for non-historic buildings, which were first placed in service before 1936. Benefits are derived from tax credits in the year the property is placed in service, cash flow over 6 years and repurchase options in year six.

==== Renewable Energy/Investment Tax Credit (ITC) ====
The investment tax credit is allowed section 48 of the Internal Revenue Code. This investment tax credit varies depending on the type of renewable energy project; solar, fuel cells ($1500/0.5 kW) and small wind (< 100 kW) are eligible for credit of 30% of the cost of development, with no maximum credit limit; there is a 10% credit for geothermal, microturbines (< 2 MW) and combined heat and power plants (< 50 MW). The ITC is generated at the time the qualifying facility is placed in service. Benefits are derived from the ITC, accelerated depreciation, and cash flow over a 6-8 year period.

Though set to expire at the end of 2015, the ITC for residential solar installations was renewed in December 2015. The credit continued at 30% through 2018, and slowly declined to 10% in 2022. The ITC for other technologies (including geothermal) was extended by one year.

===== Renewable Energy/Production Tax Credit (PTC) =====
Section 45 of the Internal Revenue Code allows an income tax credit of 2.3 cents/kilowatt-hour (as adjusted for inflation for 2013) for the production of electricity from utility-scale wind turbines, geothermal, solar, hydropower, biomass and marine and hydrokinetic renewable energy plants. This incentive, the renewable energy Production Tax Credit (PTC), was created under the Energy Policy Act of 1992 (at the value of 1.5 cents/kilowatt-hour, which has since been adjusted annually for inflation). In late 2015 a large majority in Congress voted to extend the PTC for wind and solar power for 5 years and $25 billion. Analysts expected $35 billion of investment for each type.

===== Low Income (Affordable) Housing Tax Credit (LIHTC) =====
Under this program, created in the 1986 Tax Reform Act, the U.S. Treasury Department allocates tax credits to each state based on that states population. These credits are then awarded to developers who, together with an equity partner, develop and maintain apartments as affordable units. Benefits are derived primarily from the tax credits over a 10-year period.

===== Qualified School Construction Bond (QSCB) =====
QSCBs are U.S. debt instruments used to help schools borrow at nominal rates for the rehabilitation, repair and equipping of their facilities, as well as the purchase of land upon which a public school will be built. A QSCB holder receives a Federal tax credit in lieu of an interest payment. The tax credits may be stripped from QSCB bonds and sold separately. QSCBs were created by Section 1521 of the American Recovery and Reinvestment Act of 2009. Internal Revenue Code Section 54F also addresses QSCBs.

==== Research & Development Tax Credit ====
The Credit For Increasing Research Activities (R&D Tax Credit) is a general business tax credit under Internal Revenue Code Section 41 for companies that incur research and development (R&D) costs in the United States. For most companies, this credit is worth 7–10% of qualified research expenses each year. It can be used to offset income or payroll taxes, depending on the situation.

==== Work Opportunity Tax Credit (WOTC) ====
The Work Opportunity Tax Credit (WOTC) is a federal tax credit providing incentives to employers for hiring groups facing high rates of unemployment, such as veterans, youths and others. WOTC helps these targeted groups obtain employment so they are able to gain the skills and experience necessary to obtain better future job opportunities. The WOTC is based on the number of hours an employee works and benefits the employer directly.

The WOTC was established by the Small Business Job Protection Act of 1996. The WOTC replaced the Targeted Jobs Tax Credit (TJTC), which was created by the Revenue Act of 1978 and was in place from 1978 to 1994. In December 2014, the WOTC was extended retroactively to the beginning of 2014 by the Tax Increase Prevention Act of 2014 (TIPA), P.L. 113–295. That act authorized the credit only through December 31, 2014. Later, through the Protecting Americans from Tax Hikes Act of 2015 (the PATH Act), Congress modified and extended the WOTC through December 31, 2019.

==== American Opportunity Tax Credit (AOTC) ====
The American Opportunity Tax Credit (AOTC) was part of the American Recovery and Reinvestment Act, which was signed into law in February 2009. The AOTC replaced the Hope Scholarship credit for Tax Years 2009 and 2010, increased the benefits for nearly all Hope credit recipients and many other students by providing a maximum benefit up to $2,500 per student, 100 percent of their first $2,000 in tuition and 25 percent of the next $2,000, expanding the income range over which taxpayers can claim a credit, and making the credit partially refundable. Critics have complained that complexity and restrictions on eligibility make the actual benefits per post-secondary student much lower than the theoretical maximum, and that even with tax credits, higher education remains tax-disadvantaged compared to other investments.

==== State tax credits ====
Approximately 43 states provide a variety of special incentive programs that utilize state tax credits. These include Brownfield credits, Film Production credits, Renewable energy credits, Historic Preservation credits and others. The amount of credit, the term of credit and the cost of the credit differs from state to state. These credits can be either in the form of a certificate, which can be purchased as an asset, or in a more traditional pass through entity. The tax credits can generally be used against insurance company premium tax, bank tax and income tax.

===== Oregon Residential Energy Tax Credit (RETC) =====
The state of Oregon's RETC is a tax credit for solar systems. In 2016, Oregon Governor Kate Brown released a new budget proposal that does not extend the RETC program. In 2015, RETC gave $12.2 million in tax credits; in 2014, that amount was approximately $4.2 million. Extension of the tax credit is a top priority for Oregon's solar industry.

== Value added tax ==
Resellers or producers of goods or providers of services (collectively, providers) must collect value added tax (VAT) in some jurisdictions upon billing or being paid by customers. Where these providers use goods or services provided by others, they may have paid VAT to other providers. Most VAT systems allow the amount of such VAT paid or considered paid to be used to offset VAT payments due, generally referred to as an input credit. Some systems allow the excess of input credits over VAT obligations to be refunded after a period of time.

== Foreign tax credit ==
Income tax systems that impose tax on residents on their worldwide income tend to grant a foreign tax credit for foreign income taxes paid on the same income. The credit often is limited based on the amount of foreign income. The credit may be granted under domestic law and/or tax treaty. The credit is generally granted to individuals and entities, and is generally nonrefundable.

== Credits for alternative tax bases ==
Several tax systems impose a regular income tax and, where higher, an alternative tax. The U.S. imposes an alternative minimum tax based on an alternative measure of taxable income. Mexico imposes an IETU based on an alternative measure of taxable income. Italy imposes an alternative tax based on assets. In each case, where the alternative tax is higher than the regular tax, a credit is allowed against future regular tax for the excess. The credit is usually limited in a manner that prevents circularity in the calculation.

== See also ==
- Home mortgage interest deduction
- Tax choice
