= Child and Dependent Care Credit =

Tax credit in the United States

The Household and Dependent Care Credit is a nonrefundable tax credit available to United States taxpayers. Taxpayers that care for a qualifying individual are eligible. The purpose of the credit is to allow the taxpayer (or their spouse, if married) to be gainfully employed. This credit is created by 26 U.S. Code (U.S.C) § 21, section 21 of the Internal Revenue Code (IRC).

== Background ==
Federal courts have confirmed that expenses incurred for the care of a dependent, such as babysitting or daycare, while the taxpayer is at work, are not included in deductible business expenses and are not deductible under IRC section 162(a). As a result, single-earner households with qualifying individuals are favored over two-earner households with qualifying individuals, as the cost of daycare often outweighs the extra income made in two-earner households. IRC section 21 serves to lessen this imbalance by allowing a limited credit for certain expenses related to the care of a qualified dependent.

== General eligibility requirements ==
IRC section 21 uses the term "qualifying individual" rather than “dependent" to refer to the types of dependents the care for whom will trigger the credit. Qualifying individuals must be one of four types:
1) Dependents under age thirteen for whom a dependency exemption may be claimed,
2) Dependents of any age who share the same principal place of abode as the taxpayer and are physically or mentally incapable of taking care for themselves,
3) Spouses of any age who share the same principal place of abode as the taxpayer and are physically or mentally incapable of taking care for themselves, or
4) Certain dependent children of divorced parents.

Does the taxpayer "maintain the household"?

The taxpayer must “maintain the household” for the qualifying individual(s), which means the taxpayer must furnish over one-half of the total cost of maintaining the household. In addition, if the taxpayer is married, both the taxpayer and their spouse must have earned income, unless one spouse was either a full-time student or was physically or mentally incapable of self-care.

Does the dependent have the requisite age and relationship?

A taxpayer may be able to claim a dependency exemption for a dependent under the age of thirteen if the dependent is the taxpayer's child, sibling, half-sibling, step-sibling or a descendant of any such individual. For the taxpayer to qualify, the child must not provide more than one-half of his or her own financial support and must have the same principal place of abode as the taxpayer for more than six months of the year.

=== Creditable expenses ===
Creditable expenses include not only those incurred for actual physical care of the dependent but also ancillary “household” services like meal preparation and cleaning. Services outside the home qualify if they involve the care of a qualified child or a disabled spouse or dependent who regularly spends at least eight hours a day in the taxpayer's home. Payments to a relative also qualify for the credit unless the taxpayer claims a dependency exemption for the relative or if the relative is the taxpayer's child and is under age nineteen. No credit is allowed for expenses incurred to send a dependent to an overnight camp.

=== Amount of credit / applicable percentage ===
The credit is a percentage, based on the taxpayer’s adjusted gross income, of the amount of work-related child and dependent care expenses the taxpayer paid to a care provider. A taxpayer can generally receive a credit anywhere from 20−35% of such costs against the taxpayer’s federal income tax liability. The applicable percentage is inversely correlated to the adjusted gross income of the taxpayer − the higher the adjusted gross income, the lower the percentage.

The credit amount is equal to the applicable percentage, as determined by the taxpayer's adjusted gross income, times the qualified employment expenses paid. Taxpayers with an adjusted gross income of $15,000 or less use the highest applicable percentage of 35%. For taxpayers with an adjusted gross income over $15,000, the credit is reduced by one percentage point for each $2,000 of adjusted gross income (or fraction thereof) over $15,000. The minimum applicable percentage of 20% is used by taxpayers with adjusted gross incomes greater than $43,000.

The maximum creditable expense available under IRC section 21 is $3000 (or $6000, if taxpayer household contains more than 1 dependent). In addition, these dollar amounts must be reduced by the amount any dependent care benefits provided by the taxpayer’s employer that the taxpayer excludes from their income. For married taxpayers, expenses are limited to the earned income of the lower-earning spouse. If one spouse is not working, no credit is generally allowed. If the non-earning spouse is physically or mentally incapable of caring for himself or is a full-time student for more than five months during the year the law assumes there is an earned income. The law assumes for each month of disability or school attendance there is an earned income of $250 if there is one dependent or $500 if there are two or more.

== State child care credits ==
Twenty-two U.S. states offer child care credits tied to the federal one, as of 2023. Some of the state credits are refundable, unlike the federal one. To support higher-quality child care options, some states tie the amount of tax benefit to state quality ratings of the providers.
