= Shared earning/shared parenting marriage =

Type of marriage featuring equal responsibility

Shared earning/shared parenting marriage, also known as peer marriage, is a type of marriage where partners at the outset agree to adhere to a model of shared responsibility for earning money, meeting the needs of children, doing household chores, and taking recreation time in near equal fashion across these four domains. It refers to an intact family formed in the relatively equal earning and parenting style from its initiation. Peer marriage is distinct from shared parenting, as well as the type of equal or co-parenting that father's rights activists in the United States, the United Kingdom and elsewhere seek after a divorce in the case of marriages, or unmarried pregnancies/childbirths, not set up in this fashion at the outset of the relationship or pregnancy.

== Mechanics ==
The equality of men and women who engage in this type of marriage and family is usually measured primarily with regard to the psychological perspective of the participants. Both take responsibility for earning a substantial contribution to the family's income (sufficient to meet at least half of the family's basic expenses and preferably some reserve) and both identify as primary parents to children, responsible for childcare, meeting children's needs and supporting children's development, and as responsible for half the unpaid work of the home.

=== Earnings ===
Because earnings levels can vary with marketplace conditions, "equality" of earnings may vary, although each parent does consider him/herself to be a core earner in the family and neither's employment is considered more important than the other's.

Although parenting styles may differ between the parents, both identify as responsible for the child's welfare and the success of their upbringing, not just in terms of providing financially but personally and developmentally.

For people raised by parents who did not adopt these dual-focus responsibilities, this identification can entail a psychological adjustment. Child psychiatrist Kyle Pruett, educator John Badalament, sociology journalist Jeremy Adam Smith, educator Donald S. Unger, and psychologist Joshua Coleman, in separate efforts, have considered the psychological transition some men experience as they take on a more engaged relationship with their children and do the work of meeting a dependent child's needs, if their own fathers did not do this during their upbringing.

A number of authors have also considered the transition women experience in taking economic responsibility for meeting children's needs (or even their own needs) if their mothers did not; one famous example being philosopher Simone de Beauvoir in The Second Sex in 1949, but also more contemporary writers such as Rhona Mahony. Psychologist Stephan Poulter has looked at how the father's legacy, including from a home where the mother did not earn money, affects women's approaches to careers.

=== Naming children ===
Many of these families avoid the practice of naming children just with the father's family name and include the mother's family name as well, with the objective of supporting the parental identification and the child's two-parent family history. Some encourage gender-neutrality in passing along the surname. For example, families may use double surnames that combine the usual patrilineal surname family name with a parallel matrilineal surname, In subsequent generations the sons may retain the patrilineal half of their double surname when they marry, dropping the matrilineal half, and the daughters may do the reverse, retaining the matrilineal half and dropping the patrilineal half.

=== Child care ===
With respect to child care, and unpaid work within the household, time spent on the tasks is equal and both parents are equally responsible for meeting the needs of the child, although parenting styles may differ between the two parents. Although the biological demands on women in pregnancy and childbirth may mean that they take more leave from paid work during this time, men in these marriages take an equal amount of leave, perhaps subsequent to or staggered with the woman's leave in addition to a short period of a week or two jointly taken with the mother during the time of the birth and recovery. If the woman breastfeeds, this is typically the most significant challenge in accomplishing equal child care. To manage it, the man makes an effort to spend as much time with the baby as she spends on breastfeeding, perhaps focusing particularly on other child care needs like bathing, diaper-changing, or other interactions with the baby, and will feed breast milk that is pumped if covering feeding times when the mother is at work or unavailable. Some families defer part or all of the father's equal leave from paid work until after a child's breastfeeding is complete.

=== Employment and parental leave ===
Some couples seek reduced work schedules, such as 30-hour or 35-hour work weeks, while others will work full-time and outsource child care and house chores. If the care and/or chores are outsourced they are paid for by the parent outsourcing his or her share of the care and/or chores. Efforts are made to choose caretakers of the same gender as the parent outsourcing. In some families, relatives, such as grandfathers and/or grandmothers, may help, perhaps with one or two days of child care per week or more. Neighborhood cooperative child care, with parents of both sexes providing care, is another method used.

==== Legislation ====
Parental leave laws and government leave programs in various countries vary in whether they discriminate against or otherwise impede this type of family and parenting structure, or whether they seek to prevent discrimination against it. The funding methods for parental leave are sometimes discriminatory even if the leave is not in other respects.

===== Canada =====
In Canada, 35 weeks' parental leave is available to be divided between both parents as they choose. This leave is paid at 55% of the individual's regular earnings, up to a weekly maximum paid for by contributions into federal employment insurance (EI) program. Canada also provides for an additional 15 weeks of maternity leave for biological mothers, which is in addition to the 35 weeks of parental leave.

===== France =====
France has had a program for longer, heavily subsidized maternity leave for many years, and has recently added a shorter, heavily subsidized paternity leave and also allows two years' unpaid parental leave which can be divided between the parents however they wish. The parent on leave receives financial support from the State.

France's constitutional court also made a recent ruling that two-earner marriages were not entitled to relief from required tax subsidies to sole breadwinner marriages via income splitting.

===== Germany =====
The German State helps parents raise their children with generous parental allowance and parental leave benefits for parents of both genders. They are entitled to parental leave until their child turns three while retaining their jobs. Either parent has to give their employer a written notice in advance and can also choose to work part-time during this period. The employer cannot fire them during this period.

===== Malaysia =====
Maternity leave is usually fixed at two months post-partum, with no option of extending it. However, in the government, you may opt to take three months' post-partum leave (maternity), but on condition that you must not have more than 5 children (any child born after the 5th will only provide two months' post-partum leave). There is no recognition of paternity leave, but international companies/employers may have these. It is not a government rule for employers to allow paternity leave.

If mothers plan to take one year's leave after birth, it will be unpaid leave.

===== Sweden =====
In Sweden, föräldrapenning (parental pay) is given to parents that stay home from work to take care of children. To encourage shared parenting, there is a maximum number of days per parent so that each parent must take care of the child for at least 90 days to receive the full pay, 18.2% out of the total of 480 days.

===== United Kingdom =====
With regard to extended family carers, in the United Kingdom, a legal right to request flexible working patterns was opened to all employees who been for 26 weeks with a firm rather than being restricted to parents of children under 17, or under 18 if their child is disabled and "adults' carers". This "means grandparents could apply from April [2015] for flexible working to help look after grandchildren. Anyone taking total leave of six months or less over the period would be legally entitled to return to the same job. Employers are placed under a legal duty to consider requests in a "reasonable" manner."

In 2015 the United Kingdom transitioned from separate recognition of maternity leave and paternity leave in favor of parental leave, pursuant to which a child's parents may decide between themselves how to allocate between them 37 weeks' paid leave and 13 weeks' unpaid leave in the 50 weeks after a baby's birth. Employers will now have to agree any proposed pattern of time off and will retain the right to insist it be confined to a continuous block, with no more than two changes. Mothers also are required to take a nontransferable two weeks' paid leave at the time of the delivery (four weeks if the mother is a factory worker) and fathers get a nontransferable two week paid paternity leave. Fathers also get a nontransferable right to two days off, unpaid, to attend ante-natal appointments. The paid portion of the leave is paid for directly by the employer at the following rates for the 39 weeks: (a) the first 6 weeks—90% of their average weekly earnings (AWE) before tax and (b) the remaining 33 weeks—£136.78 or 90% of their AWE (whichever is lower). Tax and National Insurance need to be deducted from the leave payments. In announcing the changes in November 2013 Deputy Prime Minister Nicholas Clegg said "We want to create a fairer society that gives parents the flexibility to choose how they share care for their child in the first year after birth. We need to challenge the old-fashioned assumption that women will always be the parent that stays at home. Many fathers want that option too."

===== United States =====
In the United States, the Family Medical Leave Act, which applies to some employers, is sex-neutral and allows each parent 60 days' leave, which can be taken in staggered fashion with paid workdays. Except in the case of very high ranking employees, FMLA requires the employer to hold the employee's job or a similar one for his/her return from leave. FMLA is also unpaid (although health insurance plan participation stays in place) and so parents self-manage savings and financial issues associated with their leaves, unless one or both their employers has a plan for paid leave that is available or a state or local level paid family leave program is available.

Other tax and benefit programs in the United States including the Affordable Care Act's reproductive health and preventive care provisions, income taxation and benefits, Social Security taxation and benefits and Medicare taxation and benefits do discriminate against this type of family. Some state constitutions also discriminate. (See discussion below.)

====== California ======
California has a paid family leave benefit for employees who have paid into the state's State Disability Insurance fund, which pays part of an employee's foregone salary during leave up to a certain limit; the leave is therefore paid for by other wage earners and on a progressive basis (with no tax on capital or property earners, such as the owners of a corporation, to support the progressivity). Thus the program has the same extra burden that Social Security and Medicare do, where the weight of the cost of the program, including the progressive benefits for low-income workers, is carried by middle and higher earned income workers. One study has reported that college-educated workers in California are not using the paid leave and that men in general are not using the leave.

===== Other countries =====
Other countries in the Americas, Africa and Asia have paid maternity leave but little paternity leave, even unpaid.

== Incidence and publicity ==
=== Incidence ===
In the United States in 2012, wives in dual-earner families contributed, on average, 47 percent of family earnings. A 2011 study of roughly 1,000 working fathers in United States by the Boston College Center for Work and Family found that 30% of them were splitting child care equally with the mother, and most of them aspired "to share equally in caregiving with their spouse/partner." A 2008 study by the Work and Families Institute found that 31 percent of mothers in the United States reported that her partner spent as much or more time on childcare as she did. Sociologist Stephanie Coontz has written that in 2007, 49% of married couples in the United States with minor children were reporting that each parent was spending equal time on child care.

A survey in the United Kingdom in 2008–2010 found that 18% of couples were spending equal time on child care.

Data from 2002 showed the following rates of full dual earner/ dual carer families (in contrast to those with inequality in carer roles) among families with at least one child under 6 years of age:

+France: 31.4% +Sweden: 25% +Denmark: 23.3% +Poland: 23.3% +Spain: 22.7% +Finland: 19.1% +Great Britain: 17.4% +Belgium: 16.7% +Portugal: 12.2% +Germany: 0

A 2013 survey found that, in the United States, "Sixty-two percent of the public, and 72 percent of adults under 30, view the ideal marriage as one in which husband and wife both work and share child care and household duties."

=== Public examples ===
Some high-profile shared earning/shared parenting couples in the United States have been public about the 50/50 nature of their earning and family responsibilities. These include:

(a) Martin Ginsburg, deceased Georgetown University Professor of Law, and deceased Supreme Court Justice Ruth Bader Ginsburg, parents of two children,

(b) Sheryl Sandberg, COO of Facebook, and deceased David Goldberg, CEO of SurveyMonkey, parents of two children,

(c) Jesse Itzler, founder of Marquis Jet, and Sara Blakely, founder/owner of Spanx, parents of three children,

(d) Karen Nyberg, astronaut, and Doug Hurley, astronaut, parents of one child,

(e) Dr. Isabelle Rapin, recently deceased autism researcher and Professor at the Albert Einstein College of Medicine, and Harold Oaklander, Professor of Business and former Associate Dean of the School of Business at Pace University, parents of four children.

(f) Betsey Stevenson and Justin Wolfers, economics professors at the University of Michigan, parents of two children,

(g) John Roberts, Chief Supreme Court Justice and Jane Sullivan Roberts, a legal recruiter and former lawyer, parents of two children.

In Germany, President of the European Commission, former Minister of Defense and former physician Ursula von der Leyen and Heiko von der Leyen, Professor of Medicine and CEO of a medical engineering company, parents of seven children, have also been public about having this type of marriage, except for one four-year period.

== Effect on child development ==
A number of child development, other psychology professionals and sociologists have considered the implications of this type of marriage for child development, from both theoretical and empirical approaches.

In 1971, psychologist Dorothy Dinnerstein in The Mermaid and the Minotaur (released in the United Kingdom as The Hand That Rocks The Cradle and The Ruling of the World) speculated that the change to this type of upbringing from the archetypal female-dependent and female-dominated childhood (especially in infancy and early childhood) prevents developing in boys' psychology a type of compulsive dominance, aggression and narcissism and in girls' psychology a type of compulsive co-dependence (or "inverse narcissism") and passivity or passive-aggression and would allow both sexes better access to cognitive and emotional processing and assertiveness skills and prevent problems with dissociation.

Child psychiatrists Kyle Pruett and Stanley Greenspan have also considered the needs children have for care by their fathers and how they are helped by this type of marriage.

Educator John Badalament has considered some of the ways these marriages meet the psychological needs of children as contrasted with marriages set up in other styles.

Others have considered empirical data on the school performance, emotional health, and reduced rates of teen pregnancy, drug abuse, eating disorders, and criminal behavior of children raised in shared earning/shared parenting families. Research by sociologists Scott Coltrane and Michele Adams found that in families where the men have increased their share of housework and child care, their children are less likely to be diagnosed with ADHD, less likely to be put on prescription medication, and less likely to see a child psychologist for behavioral problems. They have lower rates of school absenteeism and higher school achievement scores.

A study has found that children with dads actively involved during the first eight weeks of life manage stress better during their school years. And, as Dinnerstein predicted, a Harvard University study found paternal involvement with young children was the single strongest parent-related factor in whether that child, when reaching adulthood, shows capacity for actual empathy (as distinct from co-dependence or narcissism).

A recent empirical study in the United Kingdom found that "the most beneficial working arrangement for both girls and boys was that in which both mothers and fathers were present in the household and in paid work." This result held for all levels of maternal educational attainment and household income. The study found that five-year-olds whose mothers had been unengaged in paid work had more emotional and behavioral problems than those who had mothers who worked. The longer the mother was out of the paid workforce the greater the behavioral problems.

== Marriage stability and fertility rates ==
A recent study in the United States estimated that couples who share employment and housework responsibilities are 50 percent less likely to divorce.

Developed countries with higher rates of this type of marriage have higher fertility rates than those with programs which focus on women as primary caregivers.

== Economic, financial and tax implications ==
=== Economic impact ===
Wharton School of the University of Pennsylvania economists Betsey Stevenson and Justin Wolfers, who are a shared earning/shared parenting unmarried couple, have considered some of the economic implications of shared earning/shared parenting marriage.

One study found that a man's shift from a primary earner/non-parenting role to a shared earning/shared parenting role meant he lost 15.5 percent in earnings over the course of his career, on average, while a woman who shifted from a primary earner/non-parenting role to a shared earning/shared parenting role faced a drop of 9.8 percent over the course of her career. The collective family income rises to 156% over its lifetime, on average, however, from what it would be under a sole breadwinner or female primary parent scenario. The study did not look at the impact of reduced costs in peer married from reduced risks of developmental problems for children and reduced risk of divorce in the economic analysis.

Current taxation and benefits issues in the United States that discriminate against this type of family can impose costs that reduce net income.

=== Tax policy ===
The International Monetary Fund has called for the United States, Portugal and France, all countries with significant sovereign debt, to eliminate their practices, including Income splitting, that charge two-earner families higher taxes over single income families (whether married or not).

==== United States ====
The Tax Policy Center sees the current "marriage bonus" for sole breadwinners in the United States tax system as a chief tax expenditure of the Bush tax cuts and a key contributor to the Federal debt.

The specific issue of taxation of these families in the United States has been analyzed in a number of contexts. "Stacking effect" problems from fictional Income splitting in the tax code and the marriage penalty affect these families to the point where some parents elect not to marry.

In a family of two earners with even slightly different earnings rates, the lesser earner pays more taxes on marriage because s/he will incur a "marriage penalty" and the greater earner receives a "marriage bonus" because of "stacking effect" problems. Progressivity in earned income, passive income and capital gains rates, together with fictional income splitting for tax measurement purposes, creates this problem, which also means that the two-earner families subsidize sole breadwinner families. The tax system subsidizes a family, whether married or not, where the uncompensated work of the home is done by one partner, and all earnings are held by the other partner. Because of income splitting and certain progressive benefit distribution to dependent spouses through Social Security and Medicare, sole breadwinner families at the same levels of income as two-earner families pay substantially lower taxes. All two-earner families thus have to subsidize sole breadwinner families through the "marriage bonus" given to sole breadwinners and these social programs which distribute extra benefits to the sole breadwinner; in Social Security, for example, a sole breadwinner and nonearning spouse pay 1× taxes for 2× (or more benefits), while a marriage of two earners pays 2x taxes for 2× benefits. Over time, this puts accelerating pressure on a family to have only one partner with earned income and the other do unpaid work of the family.

The effects of the marriage penalty on the marriage income collectively are also particularly acute for these marriages, although for couples for whom the standard deduction, the 15% bracket, and the Earned Income Tax Credit apply, there are some marriage penalty relief measures that were extended in 2012. The EITC still discourages two-earners and marriage, however. Two-earner families with incomes above $130,000 also save taxes by not being married.

"Stacking effect" problems also occur for families that wish to convert from the sole breadwinner model to a shared-earning/shared-parenting model. The tax system imposes a "marriage penalty" on this as a result of the fictional combined measurement of earned income through income splitting.

The National Bureau of Economic Research reported a study showing "that two earner couples—the horses that pull our economic plow—pay for the second job with taxes that are far beyond the well known marriage penalty." The effective tax rates for these families are significant factors in the currently (2012) regressive tax system in the United States that President Barack Obama, U.S. Representative and former presidential candidate Ron Paul, investor Warren Buffett, and investor George Soros and others have highlighted and criticized, although none has focused fully on the implications of the U.S. system being built around subsidizing sole breadwinners in federal taxes and benefits, including the relation to the federal debt.

Justin Wolfers sees the tax penalty on these couples as sufficient to make cohabitation preferable and thus to create a disincentive to have children inside marriage, or to marry at all, in the United States.

===== Tax reform proposals =====
No Presidential candidate has made reform of these policies part of his/her platform, however, the Senate Finance Committee in 2012 prepared a report looking at some of these issues. The model for reform in the paper focuses on one parent as primary caregiver, however, and does not analyze the problem through the construct of shared earning/shared parenting marriage.

The 2014 House GoP tax reform plan announced by Dave Camp leaves current federal modeling around a sole breadwinner / female primary parent intact, adding additional subsidies to this type of family, subsidized by peer marrieds and/or financed with debt. A 2014 proposal by Mike Lee also adds peer-married and debt-financed subsidies to this type of family.

The Obama Administration's 2014 budget proposes a "childless EITC" rather than an EITC with a baseline of 2 parents for the child. This will make it more difficult for families that qualify for the EITC but who want to do the shared earning/shared parenting style as they will have to sacrifice money they would receive under Obama's proposal by making the father a nonparent to the child. This Obama proposal has also been endorsed by Marco Rubio and Paul Ryan.

Senator Patty Murray has proposed a 20% tax cut for the "secondary earner" in a marriage. This, again, is a construct that has a baseline, or default, assumption of one primary parent responsible for a child, rather than two.

===== Social Security and Medicare benefits =====
In connection with other taxation issues in the United States, one concern is that these marriages are subsidizing one-earner/one-nonearner parent couples in Social Security and Medicare benefits. For example, in Social Security and Medicare, two-earner couples pay taxes that create a surplus or at least pay for their own benefits (and receive reduced benefits such as reduced survivor benefits), while one-earner couples pay insufficient taxes that create a deficit and receive an extra, unfunded benefit of 50% or more in Social Security (i.e., a total of 150% or more), and 100% or more in Medicare (i.e. a total of 200% or more).

This problem is exacerbated by the fact Social Security and Medicare taxes are collected only on wage income (passive income such as capital and property earnings are exempt) and benefits are progressive. This means that the chief tax burden for the programs is carried by two-earner families with wages that range between the mid-range and the cap and these families also receive fewer benefits than any other family structure or set-up.

Proposals to "raise the cap" will continue to place an extra burden on 2-earner families where each partner has earned income (not capital gains or other property-based income that is exempt from the tax).

The Affordable Care Act added a tax on passive income and capital gains to support Medicare but it is not known if this is sufficient to prevent the heavy burden faced by two-earner families in subsidizing sole breadwinner families and especially the burden faced by two-earner families with wages between the mid-range and the cap. No such tax is yet imposed to support progressivity in Social Security benefits.

== Legal implications ==
Shared earning/shared parenting marriage can face legal implications with regard to (a) the right the child has to have his/her needs met by both parents, and the right to have such needs met equally by the parents as a baseline, and (b) the respective rights employers and parents have with regard to the balance between paid work and unpaid work of child care in which participants in shared earning/shared parenting marriages engage. The former is an aspect of the broader topic of children's rights. The latter is sometimes referred to under the generic category of work–life balance.

=== Rights of children to care by both parents in various countries ===
Many laws around the world do not address the issue of meeting children's needs and who is responsible for this. The inability to prove paternity of a child biologically may have contributed to this historical legal vacuum, or in some countries legal ambiguity.

Paternity was not provable with a level of 99% certainty until 1970, when DNA paternity testing became available. In 2008, paternity testing became available through drugstores. In 2014 it costs as little as $80 with the price expected to drop further in the near future due to the advances in the science.

Many constitutions and laws have been or are being updated in recent years with this advance in information.

==== United Nations Convention on the Rights of the Child ====
The 1989 United Nations Convention on the Rights of the Child recognizes a right in children to relationships with both parents, but does not address a child having the right to have his/her needs met by both parents or a right to have his/her needs met equally by both parents as a baseline. The convention has been adopted by all United Nations member states, except the United States and South Sudan.

==== Tunisia ====
The new Constitution of Tunisia provides that men and women are "equal in rights and duties".

==== United Kingdom ====
The United Kingdom has a parental responsibility concept in the law that requires parents to meet the needs of children, such as a right to a home and a right to be maintained. The law does not see children as having a right to care by both biological parents as a default matter. Instead it holds responsible all mothers but only (a) married fathers (for any child born to the father's wife) and (b) unmarried fathers who assert such responsibility in an agreement with the mother or by court order. It also states that all parents have financial responsibility for their children.

==== United States ====
In 1967, the Supreme Court of the United States ruled in In re Gault that children were entitled to Constitutional recognition, and the concept that they are developmentally distinct from adults was recently recognized in Miller v. Alabama, however, the broader issue of the legal status of children as "persons" in the U.S. Constitution and the nexus with the rights and responsibilities of parents continues to be analyzed by legal scholars. During the Lochner era, the Supreme Court found a property right of parents in children, but no concept of a child having needs parents had the responsibility to meet.

Given that (a) children have archetypically (if inadequately) been considered by some to be entitled to rights to care by mothers and (b) mothers have archetypically (if mistakenly) been considered by some to be primarily, if not fully, responsible for the unpaid work of child care as well as, in many cases, work of supporting themselves economically, the status of women in the U.S. Constitution is relevant on the issue. In 1971, the Supreme Court of the United States ruled unanimously in Reed v. Reed that women and men were both eligible to hold the rights and responsibilities of persons and citizens with regard to family matters regulated by states, although Supreme Court Justice Antonin Scalia claimed that the word "person" cannot, did not, and does not mean "woman". He provided no basis for this challenge before he died in February 2016.

===== Historical U.S. constitutional context =====
The Constitution of the United States does not recognize rights of children as distinct from adults, nor does it recognize any developmental distinction between children and adults even if children are regarded as holding the rights that adults are, and so does not explicitly provide a framework for evaluating the rights children have to relationships with parents, or to have their needs met by parents, or the rights employers or parents have with regard to the boundaries between work responsibilities and unpaid work of attending to children's needs.

Throughout the Constitution, the Framers deliberately used the term "Person" rather than "Man" (as used in the Declaration of Independence and the contemporaneous French Constitution), a practice also followed in the Amendments, which would seem to cover children, if not recognizing the developmental distinction between children and adults or any right to have needs met by parents or the state, however, the original Constitution also sanctioned slavery of children and adults.

By the use of the term "Person", the United States Constitution may imply, if not require, a right to have needs met by both parents, in that child development to full psychological personhood in adulthood, as Dinnerstein noted (discussed above in Effect on Child Development) requires an absence of gender-essentialist family structure. Such a default right to have needs be met by both parents could thus be seen as a baseline default right of children, and responsibility of parents, in the US Constitution (which could allow for an express agreement between the parents to allocate responsibility otherwise that fully accomplishes meeting the child's needs, with a right of child to pursue the parents accordingly if needs are not met).

The fact that many of the Framers of the Constitution were "illegitimate fathers" and conceived children they did not acknowledge or recognize may have affected the ambiguity around the status of children and children's rights in drafting and ratifying the Constitution. Also, there were differing views of family structure among the framers themselves and the cultures and political economies they represented. Sociologist Michael Kimmel has said that the conventions of the time for masculinity would suggest that some of the Framers doted on their children conceived legitimately. Also, some of the Framers, such as Thomas Mifflin, George Clymer, John Dickinson, and Benjamin Franklin came from Quaker traditions, or Quaker-populated regions, in which the family was regarded as a somewhat child-centered institution, nurturing behavior in fathers was encouraged, supported and even required, women were expect to take economic responsibility for themselves, and men and women were seen as separate people in marriage (sometimes in civil disobedience of the laws of coverture). Others, such as George Washington and Thomas Jefferson, came from Anglican traditions which regarded the family as almost completely centered around the father. Jefferson never acknowledged his children with his slave, Sally Hemings. Some authors define the political economy of colonial Virginia as one where sexual predation and "illegitimate fathering" was actually encouraged.

The inability to prove paternity of a child biologically may also have contributed to the absence or ambiguity in the Constitution regarding a child's rights to having his/her needs met by his/her father.

=== Rights of employers and employees with regard to work–family conflict ===
Some employers have developed policies to address the issue of employees balancing work responsibilities and child care responsibilities, with substantial success in some cases.

In the United States, IBM, Eli Lilly and Company, and the law firm of Fenwick & West have had success with policies that address this issue.

Some employers in Singapore have also addressed this, with particular focus on gender neutrality.

In the United States, the Equal Employment Opportunity Commission has posted "best practices" as guidelines for employers. In the context of litigation, some employers have successfully established boundaries on family responsibilities issues. Some lawsuits have arisen in which employees of both sexes have alleged, and in some cases established, discrimination against them because of family responsibilities. On 15 February 2012, the Equal Employment Opportunity Commission held hearings on the subject of pregnancy and caregiver discrimination.

On 4 April 2012, Men Advocating Real Change (MARC) formed a website with blogs by Amitabh Kumar of India, Bill Proudman of the United States, Frank McCloskey of the United States, Graeme Russell of Australia, Lars Elinar Engstrom of Sweden, Martin Davidson of the United States, Michael Kimmel of the United States and Michael Welp of the United States. MARC is an organization for men focused on gender equality in the workplace and the home, with attention to work–family balance issues.

== In popular culture ==
- In TV series Parenthood, set in contemporary time, Julia, a lawyer, and Joel, a construction contractor, trade off between them periods of stay-at-home parenthood to their preschool-age daughter, and, later, their adopted grade-school-aged son.
- In TV series Nashville, set in contemporary time, Rayna James, a country music star, and Teddy Conrad, a real estate developer, first, and later, mayor of Nashville, share care of their two children, who are in grade school and middle school.
- In TV series Halt and Catch Fire, set in the 1980s, Joe, a computer hardware engineer, and Donna, a computer hardware engineer, both take care of their grade-school-aged children, although they both also outsource child care primarily to female caregivers, including Donna's mother.

== See also ==
- Gender equality
- Gender roles
- Two-body problem (career)
- Income splitting
- Marriage penalty
