= Women and HIV/AIDS =

Many women have been infected with the HIV/AIDS virus. The majority of HIV/AIDS cases in women are directly influenced by high-risk sexual activities, injectional drug use, the spread of medical misinformation, and the lack of adequate reproductive health resources in the United States. Women of color, LGBT women, homeless women, women in the sex trade, and women intravenous drug users are at a high-risk for contracting the HIV/AIDS virus. In an article published by the Annual Review of Sociology, Celeste Watkins-Hayes, an American sociologist, scholar, and professor wrote, "Women are more likely to be forced into survival-focused behaviors such as transactional sex for money, housing, protection, employment, and other basic needs; power-imbalanced relationships with older men; and other partnerings in which they cannot dictate the terms of condom use, monogamy, or HIV." The largest motivator to become part of the sex trade was addiction, the second largest being basic needs (housing, food), and the third was to support their children/family.

From the start of the HIV/AIDS epidemic in the U.S., women have been excluded and erased from the medical, governmental, and societal institutions that aim to prevent and treat HIV/AIDS. Initially, the medical community in the U.S. deemed lesbian, bisexual and queer women, as well as women who have sex with women (WSW), immune to the HIV/AIDS virus. Although this was later corrected, the spread of such false information had resulted in many women engaging in high risk sexual activities, due to the belief that they were unable to contract the HIV/AIDS virus. Lesbian, bisexual, and queer women who become infected with HIV/AIDS are statistically classified in the U.S. as heterosexual, intravenous drug, or indefinable transmission, despite the fact that it could have been contracted from another woman. Lesbian, bisexual, and queer women who are infected with the HIV/AIDS virus through sexual assault by men are also statistically categorized as heterosexual transmission. Transgender women are also especially vulnerable to HIV/AIDS transmission due to socioecological barriers that impact access to resources. Women with HIV/AIDS have been excluded from medical studies, clinical trials, financial grants, reproductive health resources, and an adequate HIV education. Women with the HIV/AIDS virus got less attention from medical, governmental, and societal institutions because of the focus on men with the HIV/AIDS virus.

== History ==
Historically, women have often been excluded from HIV and AIDS advocacy, treatment, and research. At the start of the AIDS epidemic in 1981, medical and scientific communities did not recognize women as a group for research. Women were excluded from clinical trials of medication and preventative measures. Part of the pharmaceutical industry's hesitation to involve women in drug studies was fear of liability, stemming from the catastrophic results of the thalidomide drug trials in the 60s, which caused serious birth defects in thousands of children whose mothers had partaken in the trial, resulting in hundreds of millions of dollars in legal settlements. Women were often blocked from partaking in clinical research with exclusionary with restrictions like "no pregnant or non-pregnant women". The National Institutes of Health (NIH) rejected grants that were targeted at understanding HIV in low-income women of ethnic minorities. Due to lack of research, the CDC's definition of AIDS didn't include gynecological conditions until 1994, meaning many women were previously ineligible for SSI benefits.

The number of children infected with the virus increased throughout the 1980s. Zidovudine (ZDV), alternatively named azidothymidine (AZT), was introduced as a drug to treat HIV in the late 1980s, reducing the chance of mother-to-child transmission by up to 70%.

As of 2019, women account for about 20% of reported HIV cases. The two major modes of transmission to women are heterosexual sexual intercourse and intravenous drug use.

Women can transmit the HIV/AIDS virus to other women through sexual intercourse. However, the U.S. does not statistically categorize HIV/AIDS transmission in forms other than heterosexual, intravenous drug, or indefinable transmission. Due to lack of research, statistics on women-to-women transmission of HIV is unknown. Whether or not a woman had sex with a woman is missing from over 60% from all HIV medical reports in the U.S.

== Criminalization of women in the sex trade ==
By 1988, 13 states had passed laws codifying having sex with HIV as a felony, where selling sex was usually only a misdemeanor; those exchanging sex while positive for HIV were frequently charged with attempted murder. This approach was explicitly recommended by the Presidential Commission on the Human Immunodeficiency Virus Epidemic Report published in 1988. The commission wrote that “Penalties for prostitution are too lenient, and enforcement of prostitution laws are erratic.” These recommendations became mandates two years later when the Ryan White CARE Act was passed, requiring states to demonstrate their capability to prosecute individuals who had sex while HIV positive in order to qualify for federal funding.

HIV criminalization laws frequently reproduced already-existing statistical biases of the justice system. Women who exchanged sex in public areas were disproportionately likely to be arrested compared to those who were not working outdoors. The enforcement of the laws also disproportionately targeted everyone working in the sex trade: despite the fact that those exchanging sex were far more likely to catch HIV from her client than the other way around, clients were almost never charged. Sentencing disparities between racial groups were glaring. Convicted white women were significantly more likely to be sent to a mental institution and receive HIV treatment, while black women were almost always jailed.

Criminalization of the sex trade as well as the criminalization of exchanging sex while HIV positive has been seen as a preventative measure to stop the transmission and spread of HIV while also protecting communities by outlawing the exchange of sex. Criminalization, however, only makes the exchange of sex for money more dangerous because accessing resources for harm reduction, medical services, and safe areas of exchange now has a harsher threat of incarceration. With criminalization comes charges and fines that force individuals to keep exchanging sex to pay them. This stance fails to address the poverty that caused individuals to go into the sex trade. Legalization has the same issue because of the high cost to legally comply with policies for sex workers as well as the fines that accrue when the policies are not met. De-criminalization offers the chance to provide legal protections without economic barriers so that those who need resources to stop exchanging sex for money can access them without fear of incarceration and those who choose to keep exchanging sex can access the resources needed with less danger. The de-criminalized treatment of those in the sex trade paired with harm reduction and medical services have become best practice for HIV intervention and treatment of those exchanging sex.

== Timeline ==
1982	The Centers for Disease Control and Prevention (CDC) declared "prostitutes" a risk category of contracting HIV.; Female (as well as male) drug users were observed to contract the disease.
1983	The NIH began to hire female nurses such as Barbara Fabian Baird to research AIDS.; The Women's AIDS Network was established.; The CDC added "female sexual partners of males with AIDS" as a risk category.
1984	Social worker Caitlyn Ryan became the first executive director of AID Atlanta, the oldest AIDS service organization in the Southwestern US.
1985	The San Francisco AIDS Foundation produced its first brochure about women and AIDS.; The San Francisco General Hospital, for the first time, admitted a woman to the AIDS ward (Ward 5B).
1986	Women represented 7% of cases of AIDS in the US.; The first book about AIDS policy, AIDS: A Public Health Challenge, was co-authored by Caitlyn Ryan. It served as a guide to many public officials.; Marie St. Cyr became the first director of the New York-based Women and AIDS Resource Network (WARN).
1987	The NIH allocated 13.5% of its total budget to women's health issues.; At the time, women were excluded from HIV trials unless they used birth control. No specifically AIDS- or HIV-related medical assistance or gynecological (relating to the female reproductive system and the breasts) care was provided.; The Food and Drug Administration (FDA) approved ZDV (AZT) as the first antiretroviral drug to treat AIDS.
1988	An article in the magazine Cosmopolitan incorrectly stated that women are able to have sexual intercourse with HIV-positive men without risk of contracting HIV if they have "healthy vaginas".; The Joint United Nations Programme on HIV/AIDS (UNAIDS) reported that the number of women infected with HIV in sub-Saharan Africa exceeded that of men.
1990	The First National Women and HIV Conference was held in Washington, DC.; The John H. Stroger Jr. Hospital of Cook County in Chicago, the only hospital in the city with an AIDS ward at the time, refused to admit women. Demonstrators set up a ward in a street in protest, and 35 protestors were arrested. Women were admitted to the ward two days after the protest.; The Women's Caucus of the AIDS Coalition to Unleash Power (ACT UP) wrote Women, AIDS, and activism .; On May 21, ACT UP members protested for the NIH to include women and people of color in HIV trials and treatment research.
1992	The CDC expanded the definition of HIV to include symptoms experienced by people of color and women in HIV trials and treatment recurrent pneumonia, pulmonary tuberculosis, stage III cervical cancer and recurrent vaginal candidiasis (yeast infections); The International Community of Women Living with HIV/AIDS (ICW) was founded.
1993	The US Congress enacted the NIH Revitalization Act, giving the Office of AIDS Research (OAR) primary oversight of all AIDS research in the NIH. The act required all agencies to include women and ethnic minorities in research.; Gena Corea's book, The Story of Women and AIDS: The Invisible Epidemic, was published.; HIV became the leading cause of death for African-American women aged 25–44.
1994	On August 5, the US Public Health Service recommended that HIV-positive women take ZDV (AZT) to reduce the chance for perinatal transmission (infection through birth) of HIV, citing an ACTG 076 study that concluded that the drug reduces transmission by up to 70%.; The US Department of Health and Human Services issued orders that all grants that requested funding from the NIH must address and include the "appropriate inclusion of women and minorities in clinical research".; Class action lawsuit S.P. v. Sullivan forces the Social Security Administration to expand HIV-related disability criteria for women.
1996	The annual number of new AIDS cases in the US declined because of antiretroviral therapies.
1997	Women accounted for more than half of all cases of HIV globally.; In the US, 75% of diagnosed HIV cases were in African-American women.
1999	1.1 million women globally died from HIV/AIDS.; In America, girls aged 13 years old to 19 years old make up the majority of new HIV/AIDS cases.
2002	2 million women worldwide became infected with HIV/AIDS.; 1.2 million women around the world died from HIV/AIDS.
2008	Native American women became the third most likely to contract HIV/AIDS, following Black and Latina women.; Native American women are found to be 2.4 times as likely to contract HIV/AIDS, compared to white women.
2010	Women began representing 1 out of every 4 cases of HIV/AIDS in the U.S.
2011	HIV/AIDS became the leading cause of death for African American women aged 25 to 34.; Black women are found to be 15 to 20 times as likely to become infected with HIV/AIDS than their white counterparts.; Latina women are found to be 4 times as likely to contract HIV/AIDS than white women.
2018	The CDC determines 14.1% of all transgender women in the U.S. have HIV/AIDS.; It is established that 44.2% of all HIV infected transgender women in the U.S. are Black women.; Research shows that 25.8% of all HIV infected transgender women in the U.S. are Latina women.
