= ICDL =

ICDL may refer to:

- Interdisciplinary Council on Developmental and Learning Disorders
- International Certification of Digital Literacy (formerly the European Computer Driving Licence)
- International Children's Digital Library

ICDL in full words is international computer driving licence
