= Justin Wolfers =

Australian economist and public policy scholar

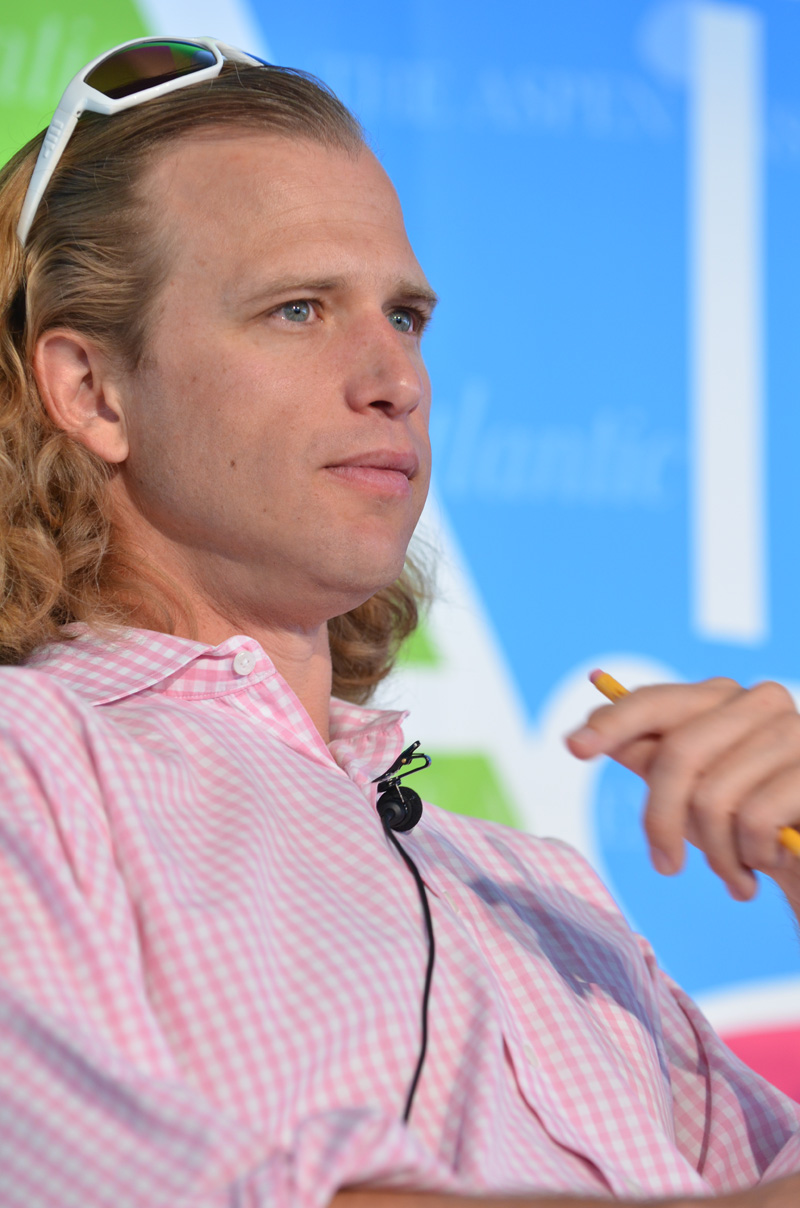
- Wolfers (c.2009)
- Born: Justin James Michael Wolfers; 11 December 1972 (age 53); Papua New Guinea
- Partner: Betsey Stevenson

Academic background
- Education: University of Sydney (BEcon); Harvard University (MA, PhD)
- Doctoral advisor: Lawrence F. Katz; Olivier Blanchard
- Other advisors: Christopher Jencks; Alberto Alesina

Academic work
- Institutions: Brookings Institution; University of Michigan

Justin James Michael Wolfers (born 11 December 1972) is an Australian-American economist and public policy scholar.

He is professor of economics and public policy at the Ford School of Public Policy at the University of Michigan, and a non-resident senior fellow at both the Brookings Institution and the Peterson Institute for International Economics.

== Education ==
Wolfers attended James Ruse Agricultural High School, in Sydney (1985–1990). It was in high school that he became interested in economics, noting the influence of his economics teacher.

Following graduation from high school, Wolfers earned a bachelor's degree in economics from the University of Sydney in 1994.

He then moved to the United States, and at Harvard University earned a MA in economics in 2000 and a PhD in economics in 2001. Wolfers is a Fulbright Scholar.

== Career ==
Wolfers was associate professor of business and public policy at the Wharton School of the University of Pennsylvania. With his partner, fellow economist Betsey Stevenson, in the fall of 2012 Wolfers moved to the University of Michigan as professor of economics and public policy. Wolfers is a non-resident senior fellow at the Brookings Institution and at the Peterson Institute for International Economics, a research associate of the National Bureau of Economic Research, a research fellow of the IZA in Bonn and a research affiliate of the Centre for Economic Policy Research in London. He is also a visiting professor of economics at the University of Sydney.

== Work ==
Wolfers is noted for his research on happiness and its relation to income. He is a contributor to The New York Times (where he writes for The Upshot blog) and The Wall Street Journal. He was an editor of the Brookings Papers on Economic Activity from 2009 through 2015. His research has explored macro economics, labour economics, the economics of sports, prediction markets, and the family.

In 2019, Stevenson and Wolfers wrote two economics textbooks, Principles of Microeconomics and Principles of Macroeconomics, published by Macmillan Learning. The aim of the authors was to reflect a school of thought where "every decision a person makes is an economic decision" and to offer examples students could relate to, reflecting the real world.

Stevenson and Wolfers host the Think Like an Economist podcast which intends to introduce the audience to economic ideas and empower folks to make better decisions.

Wolfers publishes Platypus Economics on Substack, which debuted in the Spring of 2026. The newsletter offers free and paid subscriptions, providing links among its options to earlier work and video of interviews on other programs and platforms as well as an online chat.

== Personal life ==
Wolfers and his partner Betsey Stevenson have two children. They are unmarried for tax reasons and often have discussed being in a shared earning and parenting relationship during interviews and public appearances.

== Reception ==
- In 2007, Wolfers was named in a David Leonhardt column as one of 13 young economists who were the future of economics.
- In 2014, Wolfers was named by International Monetary Fund as one of the 25 brightest young economists who are expected to shape world thinking about the global economy in the future.
