= Melvin Stephens Jr. =

American economist

Melvin (Mel) Stephens Jr.

Academic background
- Education: Michigan (Ph.D.); University of Maryland (B.A.)

Academic work
- Discipline: Labor economics
- Institutions: University of Michigan; Heinz School, Carnegie Mellon University
- Website: http://www-personal.umich.edu/~mstep/; Information at IDEAS / RePEc

Melvin "Mel" Stephens Jr. is an American economist and professor of economics and public policy in the economics department and the Ford School of Public Policy at the University of Michigan. He is also a research associate of the National Bureau of Economic Research, and a member of the Academic Research Council of the U.S. Consumer Financial Protection Bureau. His research is in the areas of displaced workers, household consumption, and retirement decisions. He has been nominated as an officer of the American Economic Association.

== Selected works ==
- Stephens Jr, Melvin. "Worker displacement and the added worker effect." Journal of Labor Economics 20, no. 3 (2002): 504–537.
- Charles, Kerwin Kofi, and Melvin Stephens Jr. "Job displacement, disability, and divorce." Journal of Labor Economics 22, no. 2 (2004): 489–522.
- Stephens Jr, Melvin. "" 3rd of tha month": Do social security recipients smooth consumption between checks?." American Economic Review 93, no. 1 (2003): 406-422.
- Haider, Steven J., and Melvin Stephens Jr. "Is there a retirement-consumption puzzle? Evidence using subjective retirement expectations." The review of economics and statistics 89, no. 2 (2007): 247–264.
- Stephens Jr, Melvin. "The long-run consumption effects of earnings shocks." Review of Economics and Statistics 83, no. 1 (2001): 28–36.
