= Ford School of Public Policy =

Public policy school of the University of Michigan

University of Michigan Ford School of Public Policy
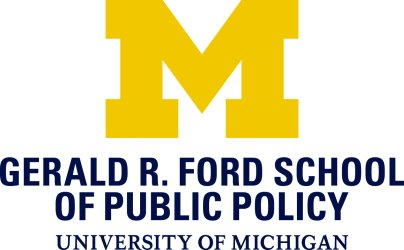
- Former names: Institute of Public and Social Administration (1936-1946); Institute of Public Administration (1946-1995); School of Public Policy (1995-1999)
- Type: Public
- Established: 1914; 112 years ago
- Parent institution: University of Michigan
- Affiliations: APSIA
- Dean: Celeste Watkins-Hayes
- Faculty: 89
- Students: 312 (FA 2015)
- Undergraduates: 135 (FA 2015)
- Postgraduates: 177 (FA 2015)
- Location: Ann Arbor, Michigan, U.S.
- Campus: Urban
- Website: fordschool.umich.edu

The Ford School of Public Policy (formally the Gerald R. Ford School of Public Policy) is the public policy school of the University of Michigan in Ann Arbor, Michigan. It was founded in 1914 to train public administration experts. In 1999, the school was named after University of Michigan alumnus and the 38th president of the United States Gerald Ford.

The school offers two master's degrees, 14 dual-master's programs, three joint PhDs, a Bachelor of Arts in public policy, a minor in public policy, and a graduate certificate in science, technology, and public policy.

On average, the Ford School's master's of public policy cohorts consist of 110 students, the master's of public affairs cohorts consist of 20 students, the doctoral program consists of 35 students, the bachelor degree cohorts consist of 80 students, and the minor cohorts consist of 30 students. The school has over 4,000 alumni.

== History ==
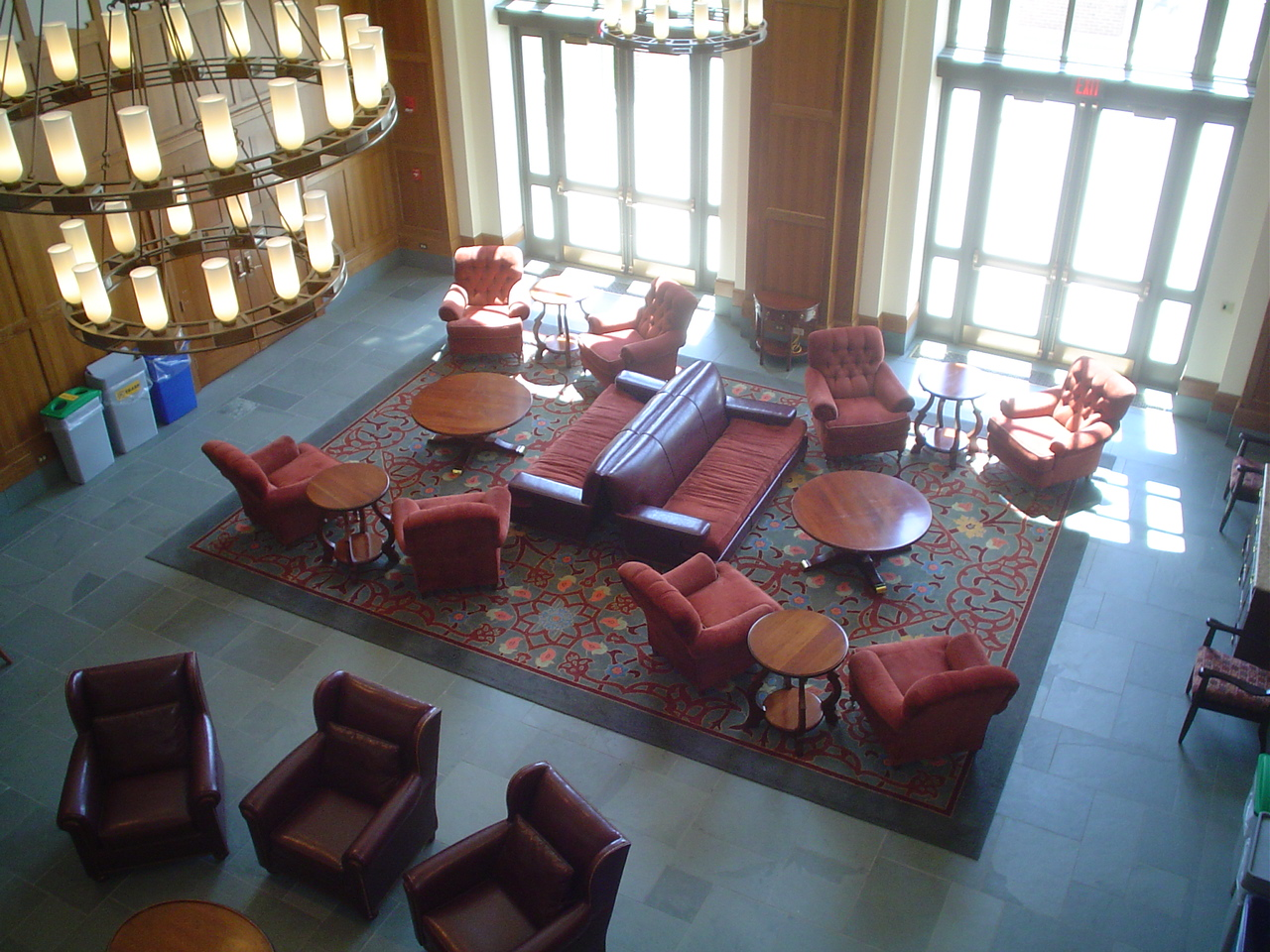
The Becky Blank Great Hall, which is most often used as a study area but also hosts events.

The University of Michigan first offered its graduate program in municipal administration in 1914, the first university in the United States to do so.

The program went through a few changes in the 1930s and 1940s —in 1936, the program became the Institute of Public and Social Administration. Ten years later, in 1946, it became the Institute of Public Administration. The institute grew over the years, and the University established it as a school in 1995. The School of Public Policy was housed in Lorch Hall on the University of Michigan campus. In 1999, the school was renamed in honor of former President Gerald R. Ford, who graduated from the University of Michigan in 1935.

In 2006, Joan and Sanford Weill Hall was built to give the Ford School a place on campus. The Weill family donated $8 million, $5 million for the construction of a new $35 million building (dedicated on October 13, 2006), which houses classrooms, offices, and meeting space for students, faculty and staff, and $3 million to endow the position of dean of the school. The five-story structure, designed by the firm of the 2011 Driehaus Prize winner Robert A.M. Stern Architects, houses several research centers, a policy library, and study areas for students.

In September 2007, the school began its first bachelor’s of arts in public policy program with 50 third-year students beginning the two-year program of study.

== Curriculum ==
The Ford School offers the following degrees and programs:

- Master of Public Policy, a two-year program that provides training in policy analysis, political and ethical analysis, communication, and leadership.
- Master of Public Affairs, a 30-credit program that combines training in applied policy analysis with the development of public and nonprofit management, leadership, and communication skills.
- 13 dual-degree programs, ranging from a degree from the Ross School of Business, to the University of Michigan Law School.
- Joint PhDs in Public Policy and Economics, Political Science, and Sociology, respectively, which allows students to combine their public policy studies with disciplinary work at another school at U-M.
- Bachelor of Arts in public policy, a liberal arts undergraduate degree based in social science
- Minor in public policy, an undergraduate minor provides students the training to analyze, write, and design policies.
- Science, Technology, and Public Policy graduate certificate program, a 12-credit program that analyzes the role of science and technology in policymaking and explores the political and policy landscape of science and technology areas.
- Predoctoral Program in Policy, which offers master’s students the opportunity to gain skills, network and mentor relationships necessary for doctoral studies.

Of the doctoral program, the masters programs, and the undergraduate program in public policy, the MPP program is the largest. The Ford School offers policy concentrations for its master of public policy students. The concentrations include public policy analysis methods, nonprofit and public management, social policy, international policy, and international economic development.

Another component of the MPP curriculum is hands-on experience, which takes the form of a required ten-week internship, typically completed in the summer between the program's two years.

Students also study and travel during the academic year. The Ford School has three courses that give students experience with policymaking and/or international exposure:

- Strategic Public Policy Course – A semester-long course that engages students in a supervised consulting project with a real-world client.
- Integrated Policy Exercise – A week-long, school-wide simulation addressing either a local or international issue.
- International Economic Development Program – A semester-long course in which students, in conjunction with a faculty member, study the economic, political, and social development of a developing country, culminating in a visit over the winter break.

In 2018, Ford School undergraduate students traveled to Costa Rica through a seminar that addresses international policy questions. The students traveled to Costa Rica over their Spring Break.

The Ford School has developed dual degrees with many professional programs, which enables students to complete work on two degrees simultaneously. They include:

- Business Administration and Public Policy (MPP/MBA)
- Law and Public Policy (MPP/JD)
- Higher Education and Public Policy (MPP/MA)
- Public Health and Public Policy (MPP/MHSA or MPP/MPH)
- Social Work and Public Policy (MPP/MSW)
- Urban and Regional Planning and Public Policy (MPP/MURP)
- Information and Public Policy (MPP/MSI)
- Environment and Sustainability and Public Policy (MPP/MS)
- Applied Economics and Public Policy (MPP/MAE)
- Medicine and Public Policy (MPP/MD)
- Asian Studies: China and Public Policy (MPP/MA)
- Asian Studies: Southeast Asia and Public Policy (MPP/MA)
- Russian, East European, and Eurasian Studies and Public Policy (MPP/MA)

In 2016, the Ford School partnered with the INCAE Business School in Costa Rica to create a dual MPA/MBA degree program. Students from INCAE spend their first year in Costa Rica obtaining an MBA, then move to the Ford School to obtain an MPA in their second year.

The Ford School is one of the only schools to host the Public Policy and International Affairs (PPIA) Junior Summer Institute (JSI) since its inception in 1981. Formerly known as the Sloan or Woodrow Wilson fellowship, the program is an academic graduate-level preparation program for rising seniors committed to public service careers. Its goal is to address the lack of diversity in professional public service, including government, nonprofits, public policy institutions, and international organizations. The program prepares students to obtain a master’s or joint degree in public policy, public administration, international affairs, or a related field.

The Ford School’s JSI curriculum includes statistics, microeconomics, current policy issues, and writing instruction. Students receive funding for housing, travel expenses, meals, books, and course supplies. During the program, they can access libraries, computers, enrichment and professional development activities.

== Research ==
The Ford School is home to or helps support a number of multi-disciplinary research centers that focus on policy concerns including:

- Center for Local, State, and Urban Policy (CLOSUP)
- Center on Finance, Law, and Policy
- Center for Racial Justice
- Education Policy Initiative
- International Policy Center
- Science, Technology, and Public Policy Program
- Poverty Solutions
- Program in Practical Policy Engagement
- Weiser Diplomacy Center
- Youth Policy Lab

Most members of the school's faculty have joint appointments in other departments, and there are visiting professors from around the U.S. and other countries. The Ford School also hosts a Diplomat in Residence to provide students with firsthand access to information about the U.S. State Department.

== Memberships and awards ==
The school is a full member of the Association of Professional Schools of International Affairs (APSIA), a group of public administration, public policy, and international studies schools. The Ford School is also a member of The Network of Schools of Public Policy, Affairs, and Administration (NASPAA), the recognized global accreditor of master's degree programs in public administration, public policy, public affairs, nonprofit and related fields.

In 2021, APSIA awarded the Ford School’s Student-Initiated Projects through the Weiser Diplomacy Center and Extended Research Projects through the International Policy Center with the Innovation Award for Professional Development Programming.

== Faculty ==
Notable past and present Ford School faculty include:

- Scott Atran
- Robert Axelrod
- Michael Barr
- Rebecca Blank
- Bill Bynum
- Susan M. Collins
- Paul Courant
- Sheldon Danziger
- Christian Davenport
- Alan Deardoff
- Kathryn M. Dominguez
- James Duderstadt
- Susan Dynarski
- Abdul El-Sayed
- Robert Hampshire
- John Hieftje
- Gerald Hills
- Brian Jacob
- Paula Lantz
- Sander Levin
- Melvyn Levitsky
- Earl Lewis
- Daniel Little
- Jeffrey Morenoff
- Susan D. Page
- Shobita Parthasarathy
- Joe Schwarz
- Melvin Stephens Jr.
- Betsey Stevenson
- Jan Svejnar
- Maris Vinovskis
- Susan Waltz
- Celeste Watkins-Hayes
- Marina Whitman
- Justin Wolfers
