= Interdisciplinary Council on Developmental and Learning Disorders =

Nonprofit organization

- Founder: Stanley Greenspan and Serena Wieder
- Type: Nonprofit
- Purpose: Learning disability
- Headquarters: 6701 Democracy Blvd; Bethesda, MD 20817
- Location: 4938 Hampden Lane, Suite 800, Bethesda, Maryland 20814
- Coordinates: 39°1′20.7″N 77°8′12.5″W
- Region served: Worldwide
- Key people: Richard Lodish; (President); Stuart Shanker; (Vice President); Nancy Greenspan; (Secretary/Treasurer)
- Website: link

The Interdisciplinary Council on Developmental and Learning Disorders (ICDL) is a nonprofit organization founded by Stanley Greenspan and Serena Wieder for identification, prevention, and treatment of developmental and learning disorders.
