= Marriage penalty =

United States federal taxation aspect

The marriage penalty in the United States refers to the higher tax rate applicable to the lower-earning spouse when a married couple files jointly, as compared to if the spouses each filed his or her tax return using “single” status. There is also a marriage bonus that applies in other cases if the couple jointly is taxed at a lower effective tax rate than if they each filed using single status. Multiple factors are involved, but in general, in the current U.S. system, single-income married couples usually benefit from filing as a married couple (similar to so-called income splitting), while dual-income married couples are often penalized. The percentage of couples affected has varied over the years, depending on shifts in tax rates.

== Progressive taxation rates combined with income splitting ==
Section 1 of the US tax code fixes different income levels for passing from one marginal tax rate to another, depending on whether the filing is done as a single person or as a married couple. For lower incomes, the transition points for married couples are twice those for single persons, which benefits a couple that gets married if their incomes are sufficiently different. This is equivalent to "income splitting", meaning that the tax due is the same as if the two persons use the schedule for single persons, but with each declaring half the total income. At higher incomes, this equivalence is lost but there is still an advantage if the two incomes are sufficiently different.

If the incomes of the two persons are similar, then at the lower end of the tax schedule there is no difference between filing as singles and filing as a married couple (ignoring the question of deductions, see below). But at the higher end of the tax schedule, there is a penalty for a married couple whose incomes are similar, compared to what they would pay as singles.

For example, the following chart shows the US federal tax rates for 2026:

Marginal tax rate	Single	Married filing jointly or qualified widow(er)	Married filing separately	Head of household
10%	$12,400 or less	$24,800 or less	$12,400 or less	$17,700 or less
12%	$12,401 to $50,400	$24,801 to $100,800	$12,401 to $50,400	$17,701 to $67,450
22%	$50,401 to $105,700	$100,801 to $211,400	$50,401 to $105,700	$67,451 to $105,700
24%	$105,701 to $201,775	$211,401 to $403,550	$105,701 to $201,775	$105,701 to $201,750
32%	$201,776 to $256,225	$403,551 to $512,450	$201,776 to $256,225	$201,751 to $256,200
35%	$256,226 to $640,600	$512,451 to $768,700	$256,226 to $384,350	$256,201 to $640,600
37%	Over $640,600	Over $768,700	Over $384,350	Over $640,600

Under these tax rates, two single people who each earned $87,850 would each file as "Single" and each would pay a marginal tax rate of 25%. However, if those same two people were married, their combined income would be exactly the same as before (2 * $87,850 = $175,700), but the "Married filing Jointly" tax brackets would push them into a higher marginal rate of 28%, costing them an additional $879 in taxes.

In the most extreme case, two single people who each earned $400,000 would each pay a marginal tax rate of 35%; but if those same two people filed as "Married, filing jointly" then their combined income would be exactly the same (2 * $400,000 = $800,000), yet $350,000 of that income would be taxed as the higher 39.6% rate, resulting in a marriage penalty of $32,119 in extra taxes ($16,100 for the 39.6% bracket alone, plus the remainder is due to the higher phase out of the lower brackets.) Using the formulas for 2016 income, if both persons have a taxable income X greater than $415,050 then as singles each would pay 0.396X−$43830.05, whereas if they were married filing jointly they would pay 2(0.396X)−$54333.70, so they lose 2($43830.05)−$54333.70 or $33,326.40.

In some couples, the greater earner may benefit from filing as married, while the lesser earner from not being married. For example, consider two single people, one with an income of $100,000 (and therefore paying a marginal rate of 28%) and the other with no income (and therefore paying no income tax). By being married and filing jointly, the $100,000 earner reduces his/her bracket to the 25% rate, receiving a "marriage bonus" for a net tax savings of $364, while the nonearner goes from the 10% bracket to the 25% bracket on the first dollars earned upon entering the workforce.

It can be shown that it is mathematically impossible for a tax system to have all of (a) marginal tax rates that increase with income, (b) joint filing with (full) income splitting for married couples, and (c) combined tax bills that are (entirely) unaffected by two people's marital status. Partial income splitting models allow only a part of the income to be transferred among spouses in order to balance such criteria.

== Deductions ==
The U.S. tax code allows taxpayers to claim deductions that reduce taxable income, such as certain charitable contributions, mortgage interest, and state and local income, property, and sales taxes (such deductions which are subject to limitations including, but not limited to, the $10,000 state and local tax deduction limit and the 50% AGI limit for charitable deductions). A taxpayer can generally choose either an automatic standard deduction or itemized deductions. An unmarried individual filing a tax return under single or head of household status can choose the deduction method that is most beneficial, but a married couple will be required to use the same deduction method in most cases (Title 26 U.S. Code §63(c)(6)(A)). For example, if each spouse in a married couple files a separate tax return, then the standard deduction is not allowed for either spouse if one spouse claims itemized deductions. This may result in a higher taxable income and higher effective tax rate for the spouse who could otherwise claim the larger standard deduction if single.

On the other hand, being married can result in a lower effective tax rate if only one spouse works because the marginal tax bracket for married couples filing jointly is twice as much compared to the same marginal bracket for singles, and the standard deduction is twice the amount for married filing jointly compared to single status.

== Social security/Medicare burden and subsidy to sole breadwinners and nonearning parents ==
In connection with other taxation issues in the United States, one concern is that these marriages are subsidizing one-earner/one-nonearner parent couples in Social Security and Medicare benefits. For example, in social security and Medicare, two-earner couples pay taxes that create a surplus or at least pay for their own benefits (and receive reduced benefits such as reduced survivor benefits), while one-earner couples pay insufficient taxes that create a deficit and receive an extra, unfunded benefit of 50% or more in Social Security (i.e., a total of 150% or more), and 100% or more in Medicare (i.e. a total of 200% or more).

This problem is exacerbated by the fact Social Security and Medicare taxes are collected only on wage income, passive income such as capital and property earnings are exempt, and benefits are progressive. This means that the chief tax burden for the programs is carried by two-earner families with wages that range between the mid-range and the cap and these families also receive fewer benefits than any other family structure or set-up.

=== Impact of current social security reform proposals and recent Medicare tax reform in the United States ===
Proposals to "raise the cap" will continue to place an extra burden on 2-earner families where each partner has earned income (not capital gains or other property-based income that is exempt from the tax).

The Affordable Care Act added a tax on passive income and capital gains to support Medicare but it is not known if this is sufficient to prevent the heavy burden faced by two-earner families in subsidizing sole breadwinner families and especially the burden faced by two-earner families with wages between the mid-range and the cap. No such tax is yet imposed to support progressivity in Social Security benefits.

== Relationship to reduction of government debt ==
The Tax Policy Center also sees the current "marriage bonus" for sole breadwinners as the chief tax expenditure of the Bush tax cuts and a key contributor to the Federal debt.

The International Monetary Fund has called for the United States, Portugal and France, all countries with significant sovereign debt, to eliminate their practices, including income splitting, that charge 2-earner families higher taxes over single income families (whether married or not).

== Non-US residents ==
US citizens are generally required to report and pay federal income tax on their worldwide income regardless of income type or source. Non-residents are generally required to report and pay federal income tax on US-source income and are not allowed deductions from income, which usually results in a higher effective tax rate compared to a US citizen reporting the same amount of income. The taxation of a nonresident alien’s US-source income depends on the category of income and whether an income tax treaty is in effect between the person’s home country and the US. A resident alien is generally subject to federal income tax as if they were a US citizen (taxed on worldwide income and allowed deductions from income).

The marriage penalty can be even worse in cases where one spouse is not a citizen or resident of the United States. The US person may either file as 'Married Filing Separately' (or 'Head of Household' if they have at least one qualifying person who is not their spouse), or agree with their nonresident alien spouse to file a joint tax return that treats the nonresident alien spouse as a resident alien. The former requires using the 'Married Filing Separately' or 'Head of Household' tax brackets, which are less beneficial than 'Married Filing Jointly'. The latter allows that person to use the more favorable 'Married Filing Jointly' tax brackets but requires paying tax on the non-US person's worldwide income, which would not be required for the foreign spouse not otherwise considered a resident for US tax purposes.

== See also ==
- Bachelor tax
- Druker v. Commissioner of Internal Revenue
- Income splitting
- Kiddie tax
- Shared earning/shared parenting marriage
- Taxation in the United States
