= Income splitting =

Tax strategy

Income splitting is a tax strategy of transferring earned and passive income of one spouse to the other spouse for the purposes of assessing personal income tax (i.e. "splitting" away the income of the greater earner, reducing his/her income for tax measurement purposes), thus reducing the tax paid by the spouse who earns more and increasing the tax paid by the spouse who earns less, with the goal of reducing the overall tax liability of the family.

== Global incidence and ramifications for sovereign debt and fertility rates ==
The International Monetary Fund has called for the countries to abandon the practice of taxing family income instead of individual income.

Some countries require joint returns but measure the tax on income individually, while others use only individual returns. Tax laws in these countries generally have regulations preventing the direct transfer of earned income from one spouse to another to reduce taxes. There are often still methods of using income splitting to reduce taxes in these jurisdictions. For those who own their own company, hiring family members will often reduce the overall tax burden by shifting income to lower-income family members.

== United States ==
According to the Tax Policy Center, under US tax law married couples who file jointly may receive a "marriage bonus" in the form of reduced tax liability relative to their combined liability if they filed separately. Couples in which one spouse makes all or most of the income are more likely to see a marriage bonus than couples where both spouses have similar incomes, who in some cases may instead experience a "marriage penalty" if filing jointly pushes their combined income into a higher tax bracket.

== Germany ==
In Germany, income splitting involves two aspects. First, if married couples file jointly, their total tax liability is determined by twice the tax liability of applying half the total taxable income. Let $y_1$ and $y_2$ denote each spouse's taxable income. Defining $T(.)$ the tax schedule, the tax due for couples is computed by $2 T\left( \frac{y_1 + y_2}{2} \right) \leq T(y_1) + T(y_2)$. The splitting advantage increases if both partners have unequal incomes. Another consequence is a high marginal tax rate for the secondary earner, as the secondary earner indirectly pays the marginal tax rate of the higher-earning spouse.

The second aspect involves the Withholding tax (Lohnsteuer) which is paid on employment income. Family taxation implies that married couples may split the total basic exemption (Grundfreibetrag). This is done via choosing the appropriate tax bracket (Steuerklasse). The higher-earning spouse predominantly opts for Steuerklasse III to claim both exemptions, while the lower-earning spouse will be taxed without exemption (Steuerklasse V).

Both arrangements are widely considered to create an incentive for unequal employment within married couples in Germany, providing one cause for low labor force participation among married women.

== Canada ==
Income splitting was not a part of Canada's tax system until the 21st century. From the introduction of income tax, Canadian households were almost exclusively deemed to be single income households. In 1962, a Royal Commission on Taxation was initiated under Kenneth Carter by Prime Minister John Diefenbaker to examine and to recommend improvements to the federal tax system. The report declared "that fairness should be the foremost objective of the taxation system; the existing system was not only too complicated and inefficient, but under it the poor paid more than their fair share while the wealthy avoided taxes through various loopholes."

From the Carter commission's report:

"We conclude that the present system is lacking in essential fairness between families in similar circumstances and that attempts to prevent abuses of the system have produced serious anomalies and rigidities. Most of these results are inherent in the concept that each individual is a separate taxable entity. Taxation of the individual in almost total disregard for his inevitably close financial and economic ties with the other members of the basic social unit of which he is ordinarily a member, the family, is in our view another striking instance of the lack of a comprehensive and rational pattern in the present tax system. In keeping with our general theme that the scope of our tax concepts should be broadened and made more consistent in order to achieve equity, we recommend that the family be treated as a tax unit and taxed on a rate schedule applicable to family units. Individuals who are not members of a family unit would continue to be treated as separate tax units and would be taxed on a schedule applicable to individuals."

The 1970 Royal Commission on the Status of Women recommended a system of elective joint taxation to address the issues of both tax fairness between families and concerns regarding disincentives for women's participation in the work force.

Combined family income is used to calculate a family's tax liability as well as to determine a family's eligibility for tax-delivered benefit payments, such as the Canada Child Tax Benefit (CCTB). Households of similar gross incomes are bearing broadly different tax obligations. On an individual basis this is not the case. Households with the same total income are eligible for identical tax-delivered benefit payments but may have significantly different tax liabilities. Further, while bearing the same general costs of everyday life, such as child care, one jointly filing family is unable to experience greater tax relief (available to individually filing parents), due to the requirement that child care expenses be applied to the lower spouse's income.

After enacting income splitting for retired couples in 2006, in 2011 the Conservative Party of Canada led by Stephen Harper won a majority government with a platform promising limited income splitting. The proposed policy would allow families, with children under 18, to split their household income of up to $50,000, once the federal budget was balanced. The Tories estimate that almost 1.8 million families would be able to capitalize on the tax package and they would save an average of $1,300 annually.

A 2013 study by the C.D. Howe Institute concluded that incoming splitting "does more harm than good," and a 2014 study by the Canadian Centre for Policy Alternatives claims that would primarily benefit wealthier families. However, the C.D. Howe Institute study went far beyond the scope of the limited proposal in the Conservative campaign platform by including the consequences of the provinces following suit. It also speculates upon the effects of workforce participation of the lower earning spouse which is easily addressed by elective joint taxation such as recommended by the 1970 Royal Commission on the Status of Women.

In February 2014, a day after introducing the 2014 budget, Finance Minister Jim Flaherty distanced himself from the concept of income splitting, but others within the Cabinet still support the idea.

The 2015 Canadian federal budget proposed measures to allow families to split their income.

Leading up to the 2015 Canadian federal election, Harper's Conservatives defended the newly implemented income splitting policy while Justin Trudeau's Liberal Party of Canada promised to repeal the policy. After winning a majority government in that election, the Liberals promptly cancelled income splitting for families with children in the 2016 Canadian federal budget.

== See also ==
- Bachelor tax
- Marriage penalty
- Shared earning/shared parenting marriage
