= Druker v. Commissioner of Internal Revenue =

American legal case

- Court: United States Court of Appeals for the Second Circuit
- Full case name: James O. Druker and Joan S. Druker v. Commissioner of Internal Revenue
- Argued: September 16, 1982
- Decided: December 22, 1982
- Citation: 697 F.2d 46

Case history
- Prior history: 77 T.C. 867 (1981)

Court membership
- Judges sitting: Wilfred Feinberg, Henry Friendly, Irving Kaufman

Case opinions
- Majority: Friendly, joined by a unanimous court

Laws applied
- U.S Const. amend XIV

Druker v. Commissioner of Internal Revenue, 697 F.2d 46 (2d Cir. 1982), is a decision of the United States Court of Appeals for the Second Circuit affirming the constitutionality of the marriage penalty.

The plaintiffs, James O. Druker and his wife Joan, claimed that the "income tax structure unfairly discriminates against working married couples" in violation of the Equal Protection Clause of the Fourteenth Amendment.
