= Paula Lantz =

American social epidemiologist

Academic background
- Education: BA, Sociology/English, 1981, St. Olaf College; MA, Sociology, 1983, Washington University in St. Louis; MS, Epidemiology, 1991, PhD, Social Demography, 1991, University of Wisconsin–Madison
- Thesis: Breast cancer on the rise: a socio-epidemiologic analysis of mammography screening and the increased incidence of breast cancer (1991)

Academic work
- Institutions: University of Michigan; George Washington University; University of Michigan School of Public Health

Paula M. Lantz is an American social epidemiologist.

== Early life and education ==
Lantz completed her Bachelor of Arts degree from St. Olaf College and her Master's degree at Washington University in St. Louis. Upon graduating in 1983, she completed her second Master's degree in Epidemiology and PhD in Social Demography from the University of Wisconsin–Madison.

== Career ==
=== University of Michigan School of Public Health ===
Following her PhD, Lantz joined the University of Michigan School of Public Health. During her original tenure there, she served as chair in the Department of Health Management and Policy and the S.J. Axelrod Collegiate Professor of Health Management and Policy.

=== George Washington University ===
Lantz joined the faculty at George Washington University in 2011 as Chair of the Department of Health Policy. During her short tenure at the school, she was elected a member of the National Academy of Medicine.

=== Return to the University of Michigan ===
Lantz returned to U-Mich in 2015 to serve as their associate dean for research and policy engagement and a professor of public policy. While serving in this role, she co-launched a national study on the integration of health policies and services. The aim of the study was to build a national evidence base for a strategy used by policy leaders to integrate health considerations as they develop, implement, and evaluate other policies, called Health in All Policies. As a result of her research, she was elected to National Academy of Social Insurance and announced as the inaugural James B. Hudak Professor of Health Policy.

In February 2020, Lantz was appointed to work on the National Academies of Sciences, Engineering, and Medicine consensus report that informed the U.S. Department of Health and Human Services publication on Leading Health Indicators for Healthy People 2030. During the COVID-19 pandemic, Lantz supported Michigan Governor Gretchen Whitmer’s Stay-at-home order. She also cautioned how the pandemic affected the health, social, racial, political, and economic inequities within American society. In early October, Lantz and a coalition of 15 health experts wrote an op-ed calling on the Michigan legislature and county/city governments to take a science-based approach to control the pandemic. Later that month, she was appointed to the Milbank Quarterly editorial advisory board and named to the National Academy of Social Insurance COVID-19 Task Force.

The following year, Lantz co-authored an article published in the Journal of Health Politics, Policy, and Law suggesting that federal, regional, state and local levels should "appreciate that more proximate causes [of health inequities] — higher rates of serious medical conditions, living in crowded housing, inability to work from home, and so on— are themselves a result of social inequalities produced by social systems reinforced through public policy." She was also a member of the National Academy of Social Insurance report that looked at the direct effects and outcomes of COVID-19 including hospitalizations, deaths, disability, unemployment, and racial and ethnic disparities. She also holds an appointment as core faculty for the Science, Technology, and Public Policy (STPP) program at the UM Gerald R. Ford School of Public Policy. At the conclusion of the 2020–21 academic year, Lantz stepped down as associate dean of academic affairs and began a sabbatical in Spain.
