= Floortime =

Developmental model for children

The Developmental, Individual-differences, Relationship-based (DIR) model is a developmental model for assessing and understanding any child's strengths and weaknesses. This model was developed by Dr. Stanley Greenspan and first outlined in 1979 in his book Intelligence and Adaptation. Floortime, or as it is referred to now Greenspan Floortime, was first described in 1989 his book The Essential Partnership, co-authored with his wife, Nancy Greenspan. Greenspan Floortime is an intervention that relies on the Greenspan/DIR Model to set goals and understand a child's individual social emotional profile, and focuses on stimulating a child's natural abilities to relate, communicate, and think.

== Introduction ==
The Developmental, Individual-difference, Relationship-based (DIR) model is the formal name for a new, comprehensive, individualized approach to assess, understand, and treat children who have developmental delays (including, but not limited to: Autism Spectrum Disorder). Focusing on the building blocks of typical development, this approach is also referred to as the "Greenspan Floortime" approach. However, Floortime is actually a strategy within the DIR model that emphasizes the creation of emotionally meaningful learning exchanges that encourage developmental abilities.

The goal of treatment within the DIR model is to build foundations for typical development rather than to work only on the surface of symptoms and behaviors. Here, children learn to master critical abilities that may have been missed along their developmental track. For example, Autism Spectrum Disorder (ASD) has three core/primary problems: (1) establishing closeness, (2) using emerging words or symbols with emotional intent, and (3) exchanging emotional gestures in a continuous way. Secondary symptoms (perseveration, sensory-processing problems, etc.) may also exist. Thus, treatment options are based on particular underlying assumptions. The DIR model is based on the assumption that the core developmental foundations for thinking, relating, and communicating can be favorably influenced by working with children's emotions and their effects.

The DIR model was developed to tailor to each child and to involve families much more intensively than approaches have in the past. Through the DIR model, cognition, language, and social and emotional skills are learned through relationships that involve emotionally meaningful exchanges. Likewise, the model views children as being individuals who are very different and who vary in their underlying sensory processing and motor capacities. As such, all areas of child development are interconnected and work together beneficially.

== Floortime Model Approach ==
The Floortime Model is a developmental intervention focusing on affect and the relationship between child and parent to promote development. It involves meeting a child at their current developmental level, and challenging them to move up the hierarchy of milestones outlined in the DIR Model. Once the child connects with the adult, specific techniques are used to challenge and entice the child to move up the developmental ladder.

The DIR/Floortime Model calls for 15 hours/week of parent and clinician-conducted intervention, with the parent implementing the method in 20- to 30- minute sessions for 8–12 times per day. During each Floortime session, the child takes the lead by using pretend play and conversations. Parents and often therapists follow the child with playful positive attention while tuning into the child's interests.

The DIR model is based on the idea that due to individual processing differences children with developmental delays, like ASD, do not master the early developmental milestones that are the foundations of learning. DIR outlines six core developmental stages that children with ASD have often missed or not mastered:

- Stage One: Regulation and Interest in the World: Being calm and feeling well enough to attend to a caregiver and surroundings. Have shared attention.
- Stage Two: Engagement and Relating: Interest in another person and in the world, developing a special bond with preferred caregivers. Distinguishing inanimate objects from people.
- Stage Three: Two way intentional communication: Simple back and forth interactions between child and caregiver. Smiles, tickles, anticipatory play.
- Stage Four: Continuous Social Problem solving: Using gestures, interaction, babble to indicate needs, wants, pleasure, upset. Get a caregiver to help with a problem. Using pre-language skills to show intention and become a creative and dynamic problem solver.
- Stage Five: Symbolic Play: Using words, pictures, symbols to communicate an intention, idea. Communicate ideas and thoughts, not just wants and needs.
- Stage Six: Bridging Ideas: This stage is the foundation of logic, reasoning, emotional thinking and a sense of reality.

Most typically developing children have mastered these stages by age 4 years. However, children with ASD struggle with or have missed some of these vital developmental stages.

== Structure of the DIR Model and the Floortime Approach ==
The DIR Model and the Floortime Approach work in two general parts: Assessment and Intervention. Within each of these two categories, there are further steps and strategies.

=== Assessment ===
The initial step for assessment is [Screening]. The creator of the DIR Model, Stanly Greenspan, developed a measuring tool, the Greenspan Social-Emotional Growth Chart (GSEGC), to aid parents, caregivers and clinicians in this beginning step of assessment. This tool is a basic 35-item questionnaire that evaluates a child according to the social-emotional milestones he or she has met. This preliminary step is a quick method to screen children for risk or diagnosis of Autism Spectrum Disorder (ASD) or Pervasive Developmental Disorder (PDD).

Following the initial screening process is conducting a [Comprehensive Functional Developmental Evaluation]. A child that has been screened with the GSEGC and displays significant developmental delay will then proceed to this step. In this process, a single clinician or clinicians of multiple disciplines (i.e. pediatrics, speech therapy, occupational therapy, psychology, etc.) must spend a significant amount of time observing a child. Specifically, the clinician(s) must be able to characterize how the degree to which a child is able to interact with others as it relates to developmental level.

In the final step of Assessment an [Individual Developmental Profile] is created based on the Comprehensive Functional Developmental Evaluation performed on the child. This profile is made to characterize a child's socio-emotional capacities. Through this profile, the DIR Model is able to tailor its intervention strategies uniquely to each child.

=== Intervention ===
Once the Assessment phase is completed the Intervention period is initiated. There are four different areas that the Floortime Approach aims its interventions: 1) Home 2) Educational Programs 3) Therapies 4) Play Dates.

First, the strategies and exercises laid out in the Home Intervention are of great importance for a child. It involves three core interactions: floortime; semi-structured, problem-solving interactions; and motor, sensory, perpetual-motor, and visual-spatial physical activities. This home intervention, done primarily by the parents and family, is integral to the Floortime Approach.

INTERVENTION	ACTIVITY
Floortime	Play with child by following their lead
Semi-structured Problem Solving	Create tasks that build of the child's interests to encourage and nurture their problem solving skills
Motor, Sensory, and Perceptual-Motor Activities and Visual-Spatial Activities	Engage child in activities that are tailored to their unique needs as it relates to motor, sensory, and perceptual-motor and visual-spatial activities

Second, interventions can also be applied through Educational Programs. Just as in the Home Interventions, the three core interactions are utilized in schools. Instead of primary caregivers carrying out these interactions it will be the responsibility of the teachers, teacher assistants, or peers. As an added efficiency measure, Individualized Educational Plans (IEP) can be collaboratively created and tailored for a child by their primary caregivers, teachers, or clinician. The IEP is developed with the purpose of outlining the goals of improvement for a child's specific developmental needs.

Another component of the DIRFloortime Model Intervention is a multi-disciplinary approach through different therapies. According to a child's Individual Developmental Profile, primary caregivers or clinicians can determine what types of therapy will benefit a child based on their developmental need. . Greenspan highly recommends the use of adjuvant therapies including Speech Therapy, provided by Speech Language Pathologists, and Sensory Integration Therapy, provided by Occupational Therapists. As a child's primary occupation is play, Occupational Therapy is a particularly relevant field to the Floortime Method.

== Effectiveness ==
In 2020, Boshoff et al. concluded in their systematic review over nine studies that an increase in children's socio-emotional development is observed through various outcome measures and consistent with the focus of the model. Other areas of development have received limited focus by existing studies.

The effectiveness of Floortime was examined in four randomized controlled trials in which the control group receive the usual therapies (e.g., speech therapy, occupational therapy). No evidence of effectiveness has been found across the many trials that have been performed Language function in the Floortime groups did not improve beyond what was observed in the controls. No adverse effects of Floortime have been reported.
