= Robert Hampshire =

American transportation official

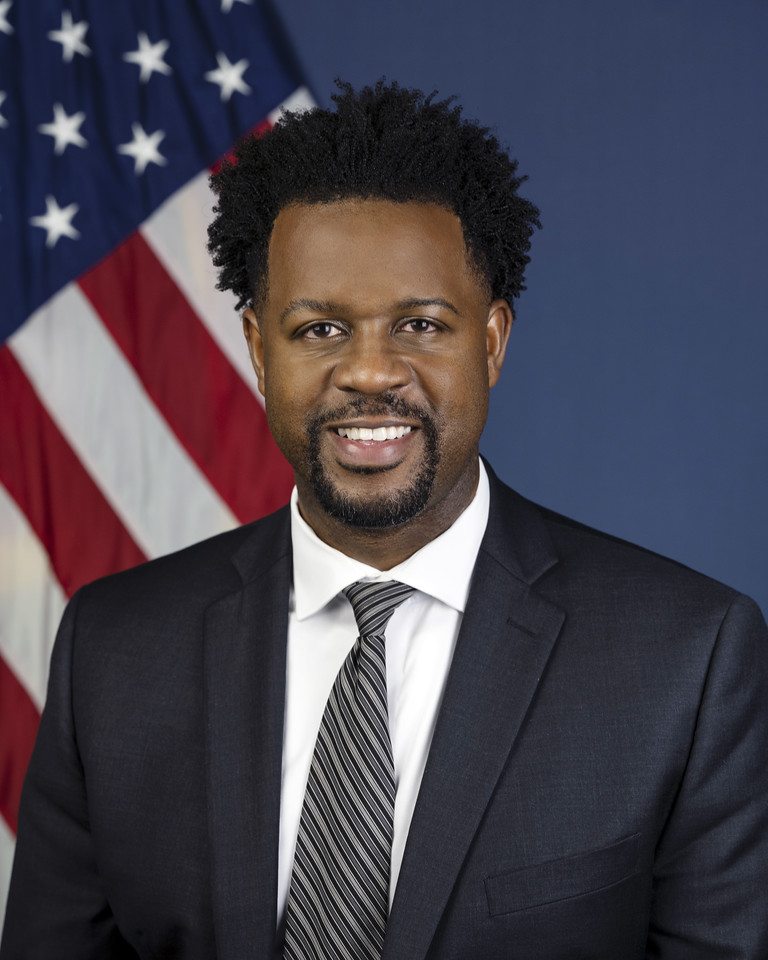

Principal Deputy Assistant Secretary of Transportation for Research and Technology
- In office January 20, 2021 – January 20, 2025
- President: Joseph R. Biden
- Preceded by: Position Established
- Succeeded by: Michael “Rocket” Halem

Personal details
- Education: University of Cincinnati (BS); Princeton University (PhD)

Robert Cornelius Hampshire is an American academic and engineer who had served as Principal Deputy Assistant Secretary of Transportation for Research and Technology in the United States Department of Transportation.

== Education ==
Hampshire earned a Bachelor of Science degree in electrical engineering from the University of Cincinnati and a doctorate in operations research and financial engineering from Princeton University.

== Career ==
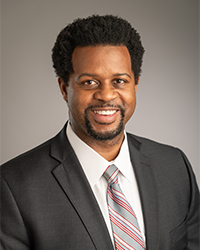
Hampshire in 2021.

Hampshire has held research positions at both Bell Laboratories and the IBM T.J. Watson Research Laboratories, and was previously Assistant Professor of Operations Research and Public Policy at Carnegie Mellon University, and Visiting Assistant Professor in Engineering Systems at the Massachusetts Institute of Technology and in the Institute for Advanced Study at Princeton. He then joined the University of Michigan, where he held positions of Research Assistant Professor, Associate Professor of Public Policy, and Associate Research Professor at the Michigan Institute of Data Science (MIDAS). At U-M he was affiliated with the Ford School of Public Policy and the Science, Technology, and Public Policy (STPP) Program, the Michigan Institute for Data Science, U-M Transportation Research Institute's (UMTRI) Human Factor's group, and the Department of Industrial and Operations Engineering (IOE) in the College of Engineering. Hampshire took leave from the University of Michigan and assumed office as United States Department of Transportation (USDOT) Deputy Assistant Secretary of Transportation for Research and Technology on January 20, 2021. On April 22, 2021, he was nominated Assistant Secretary of Transportation for Research and Technology.

== Research and notable work ==
Hampshire's research blends engineering systems studies with public policy, environment, and equity, with focus on management and policy analysis of emerging networked industries and innovative mobility services. He is a queueing theorist and uses statistics, stochastic modeling, simulation and dynamic optimization to model the movement and behavior of people, objects, and information in lines and in waiting scenarios; his doctoral dissertation focused on dynamic queuing models in operational management of communications networks. He develops and applies operations research, data science, and systems approaches to public and private service industries, and has worked extensively with both public and private sector partners worldwide. He has worked with municipalities including the City of Detroit to study smart parking, connected and autonomous vehicles, ride-hailing and novel transportation economies, and bike and car-sharing and driver and pedestrian safety. More recently, his research has focused on data equity and ethical use, as well as on challenges associated with the COVID-19 pandemic, such as urban food insecurity.

Hampshire's research has garnered a number of grants and awards: in 2019 he received a grant from the National Science Foundation to establish national frameworks regarding use and protection of sensitive data, while preventing misinterpretation and misuse against vulnerable communities; in 2020 he secured an NSF RAPID grant to address COVID-19 mediated food security in the City of Detroit, with tripartite goals of providing information and policy guidance on school lunch programs, identifying at-risk geographical areas and demographics, and developing nationwide databases to capture COVID-19 related food insecurity mitigation strategies and best practices. In 2020 Hampshire received his second grant from the Public Interest Technology University Network, to expand outreach to historically underrepresented communities and strengthen career opportunities and pathways in public interest technology; and in 2019 he was part of the collaborative effort that won the EURO award, presented by the Association of European Operational Research Societies in recognition of innovative applications of operational research, for the 2017 paper Inventory balancing and vehicle routing in bike sharing systems, which assessed bike-sharing programs in Boston and Washington, D. C. to determine service level requirements at bike sharing stations and design optimal vehicular routes to redistribute bikes across both systems, which could then be extrapolated to the more than 1,000 active bike-share networks worldwide. Additionally, Hampshire has managed grants from two University Transport Centers (UTCs) and funding from the Federal Highway Administration, the DOT Small Business Innovation Research (SBIR) program, the Federal Transit Administration, and the National Highway Traffic Safety Administration (NHTSA). He has also conducted research on connected vehicles and infrastructure with the support of the Intelligent Transportation Systems Joint Program Office (ITS JPO). On January 20, 2021, Hampshire was sworn in as the inaugural Principal Deputy Assistant Secretary for Research and Technology at the United States Department of Transportation, and serves as the department's Chief Science Officer, becoming the first to fill the role in over 40 years.
