= Shobita Parthasarathy =

American academic

- Citizenship: United States
- Known for: Innovation Policy, Intellectual Property, Sociology of Technology, Politics of Expertise
- Awards: Robert K. Merton award American Council of Learned Societies Fellow; Max Planck Institute for Innovation and Competition Fellow; Woodrow Wilson International Center for Scholars Fellow

Academic background
- Education: University of Chicago (BA); Cornell University (MA); Cornell University (PhD)
- Thesis: A global genome? Comparing the development of genetic testing for breast cancer in the United States and Britain (2003, PhD)
- Doctoral advisor: Sheila Jasanoff, Stephen Hilgartner

Academic work
- Institutions: University of Michigan
- Website: shobitap.org

Shobita Parthasarathy is an American academic, author, and contributor to the field of Science and Technology Studies based at the Gerald R. Ford School of Public Policy at the University of Michigan. During the 2025–2026 academic year, Parthasarathy was a Member of the Institute for Advanced Study’s School of Social Science, where she worked on her third book about inclusive innovation. She is the director of the Science, Technology, and Public Policy Program, a research, education, and policy engagement center concerned with questions at the intersection of science, technology, policy, and society. She has received numerous prominent awards and grants for her work and has provided expert advice on technology, equity, and policy to civil society groups, international organizations, and governments around the world, including testimony to the U.S. Congress.

== Career and research ==
Parthasarathy was the founding director of the Science, Technology, and Public Policy (STPP) program at the University of Michigan Gerald R. Ford School of Public Policy from 2006 to 2011, and currently serves as its director, in addition to holding a faculty appointment as Professor. In 2025, Parthasarathy was appointed to the National Academies of Sciences, Engineering, and Medicine’s Standing Committee on Advancing Science Communication

At U-M, she is also affiliated with the Department of Women's Studies, the Science/Technology/Society Program, Institute for Data Science, Precision Health Initiative, the Organizational Studies Program, and the Centers for European Studies and South Asian Studies; she sits on the Internal Advisory Board for the Center for Ethics, Society, and Computing. She has served on the governing councils of the Society for the Social Studies of Science and Science and Democracy Network. Parthasarathy currently serves on two committees for the National Academies of Sciences, Engineering, and Medicine: Science for Judges - Development of the Reference Manual on Scientific Evidence, 4th Edition, and Creating a Framework for Emerging Science, Technology, and Innovation in Health and Medicine.

Parthasarathy has been a fellow of the Woodrow Wilson International Center for Scholars, the American Council of Learned Societies, the Max Planck Institute for Innovation and Competition, and the American Bar Foundation. Her research has been funded by grants from the Ford Foundation, the Alfred P. Sloan Foundation, the Wellcome Trust, the National Science Foundation, the Public Interest Technology University Network, and various programs and organizations at the University of Michigan.

Her current research projects focus on rethinking innovation systems that privilege social equity and justice, examining inclusive innovation for international development, and comparing the development and governance of diagnostic testing for COVID-19 in the United States, United Kingdom, South Korea, and Singapore. Through University of Michigan's Technology Assessment Project (TAP), she is developing an analogical case study approach to better anticipate and address the social, ethical, and equity dimensions of emerging technologies. TAP has analyzed facial recognition technologies, vaccine hesitancy, and large language models.

== Notable work ==
Parthasarathy is best known for her work on the development and governance of technological innovation and the politics of evidence and expertise in policy making, all in an international and comparative framework. She has authored numerous articles and two books. Her first book, Building Genetic Medicine: Breast Cancer, Technology, and the Comparative Politics of Health Care (MIT Press, 2007) informed the landmark 2013 United States Supreme Court case regarding gene patents (Association for Molecular Pathology v. Myriad Genetics, Inc.); her second book, Patent Politics: Life Forms, Markets, and the Public Interest in the United States and Europe (University of Chicago Press, 2017) won the 2018 Robert K. Merton Prize from the American Sociological Association.

== Outreach ==
Parthasarathy provides expert advice to technical and civil society organizations, legislators, advisory bodies, policy stakeholders, and courts. In February 2021 she testified before the U.S. House Appropriations Subcommittee on Energy and Water Development, and Related Agencies on strategies for energy and climate innovation, and in July 2021 she testified before the U.S. House Committee on Science, Space, and Technology, Subcommittee on Energy on the topic of Fostering Equity in Energy Innovation. She is a non-resident fellow of the Center for Democracy and Technology. Her writings have appeared in the popular press, including but not limited to The New York Times, Slate, Nature, and The Chronicle of Higher Education. Since 2019 Parthasarathy has co-hosted The Received Wisdom, a podcast focused on science, technology, and society.

== Selected works ==
- Patent Politics: Life Forms, Markets, and the Public Interest in the United States and Europe. Chicago, IL: University of Chicago Press. 2017.
- Building Genetic Medicine: Breast Cancer, Technology, and the Comparative Politics of Health Care. Cambridge, MA: MIT Press. 2007.
- Cameras in the Classroom: Facial Recognition Technology in Schools. Technology Assessment Project, Science, Technology, and Public Policy Program. University of Michigan. 2020.
- "Ensuring Global Access to COVID-19 Vaccines," Issue Memos for an Incoming Administration, Ford School of Public Policy. University of Michigan. January 21, 2021.
