= Betsey Stevenson =

American economist

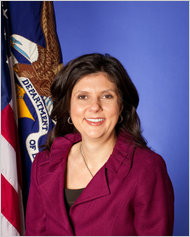

Chief Economist of the United States Department of Labor
- In office September 2010 – September 2011
- President: Barack Obama
- Preceded by: Alex Mas
- Succeeded by: Adriana Kugler

Personal details
- Born: c. 1971 (age 54–55)
- Party: Democratic
- Domestic partner: Justin Wolfers
- Education: Wellesley College (BA); Harvard University (MA, PhD)

Betsey Ayer Stevenson (born c. 1971) is an economist and a professor of economics and public policy at the Ford School of Public Policy at the University of Michigan. Additionally, she is a fellow of the Ifo Institute for Economic Research in Munich, a research associate at the National Bureau of Economic Research and serves on the board of the American Economic Association. The Obama Administration announced her appointment as a Member of the Council of Economic Advisers, a post she served from 2013 through 2015. She previously served as Chief Economist of the U.S. Department of Labor under Secretary Hilda Solis from 2010 to 2011. Previously, she was an assistant professor of Business and Public Policy, at the Wharton School of the University of Pennsylvania.

In November 2020, Stevenson was named a volunteer member of the Joe Biden presidential transition Agency Review Team to support transition efforts related to the United States Department of Treasury.

== Education ==
Betsey Stevenson earned a B.A. in economics and mathematics from Wellesley College in 1993. After working as a research assistant at the Federal Reserve, she went on to earn an M.A. and Ph.D. in economics from Harvard University in 2001. At Harvard, she studied under N. Gregory Mankiw, and had Caroline M. Hoxby, Lawrence Katz, and Claudia Goldin as thesis advisors.

== Current academic appointments ==
Stevenson is a professor of economics and public policy at the Ford School of Public Policy at the University of Michigan. Currently, Stevenson serves as a research associate at the National Bureau of Economic Research, which she has been affiliated with since 2008. She has been on the Board of Directors of the American Law and Economics Association since 2010.

In 2011, Stevenson was appointed to the Brookings Institution's, Brookings Papers on Economic Activity as an advisor. Also in 2011, Stevenson joined the editorial board of the International Journal of Happiness and Development.

On March 6, 2019, Stevenson testified for the U.S. Senate Committee on Small Business and Entrepreneurship, highlighting some of the critical issues the modern American worker faces such as technology and inadequate family support policies.

Stevenson has also conducted research on the relationship between wealth inequality and happiness alongside Justin Wolfers. The research argues for redistribution, where transferring a 10% income boost from a millionaire to a lower-income individual would increase overall happiness.

Since 2007, Stevenson has served as a research fellow for the CESifo Economic Studies.

Stevenson maintains a large Twitter following and regularly provides economic analysis on cable television.

== Past professional and academic appointments ==
After graduating from Harvard, Stevenson turned down a faculty position at the University of Michigan and went to work for Forrester Research, a technology consulting firm in California. After a few years, she accepted a faculty position at the Wharton School of the University of Pennsylvania in 2004. In addition, from 2005 to 2009 she served as a visiting scholar at the Federal Reserve Bank in Philadelphia and San Francisco.

From September 2010 to 2011, she served as chief economist of the U.S. Department of Labor under Secretary Hilda Solis.

After leaving the Department of Labor, she spent a year as a visiting assistant professor and visiting associate research scholar at the Princeton University Department of Economics. Stevenson then moved to Gerald R. Ford School of Public Policy at the University of Michigan.

== Academic research ==
Stevenson has published widely in leading economics journals about the impact of public policies on the labor market, with a focus on women and families. She has also written widely on subjective well-being. Her research is interdisciplinary, and her research had an impact in economics, sociology, psychology, and demography, and within legal scholarship. She is a columnist for Bloomberg View, and a sometime commentator for Public Radio's Marketplace program, and her thoughts on the economy are frequently covered in both print and television media.

Stevenson's research is extensive, including several papers co-authored with Justin Wolfers.

With Justin Wolfers, Stevenson co-authored the textbook Principles of Economics. The first edition was published in 2020 and the second in 2023. A 2024 profile in the IMF magazine Finance & Development said the authors wrote it using realistic examples to make economics accessible to a wider, more diverse range of students.

== Personal life ==
Betsey Stevenson has two children with Justin Wolfers, an Australian economist and public policy scholar, who is also a professor of economics and public policy at the University of Michigan. The couple met while graduate students at Harvard University. They are unmarried partners for tax reasons, and have frequently publicly discussed being a Shared Earning/Shared Parenting relationship.
