= Stanley Greenspan =

American child psychiatrist

Dr. Stanley Greenspan (June 1, 1941 – April 27, 2010) was an American child psychiatrist and clinical professor of Psychiatry, Behavioral Science, and Pediatrics at George Washington University Medical School. He was best known for developing The Greenspan Floortime Approach, found here at stanleygreenspan.com for attempting to treat children with autistic spectrum disorders and developmental disabilities.

He was Chairman of the Interdisciplinary Council on Developmental and Learning Disorders and also a Supervising Child Psychoanalyst at the Washington Psychoanalytic Institute. A graduate of Harvard College and Yale Medical School, Greenspan was the founding president of Zero to Three: National Center for Infants, Toddlers, and Families and former director of the National Institute of Mental Health's Clinical Infant Developmental Program and Mental Health Study Center.

== Career ==
The developmental model Greenspan formulated guides the care and treatment of children and infants with developmental and mental health disorders, and his work has led to the formation of regional councils and networks in most major American cities.

He has been recognized internationally as a foremost authority on mental health and disorders in infants and young children, having received awards from both the American Psychiatric Association and the American Orthopsychiatric Association. In 1981, he received the Ittleson Prize, the American Psychiatric Association's award for child psychiatry research. He also received the Blanche F. Ittleson award from the American Orthopsychiatric Association for outstanding contributions to American mental health. In 2003, he received the Mary S. Sigourney Award for distinguished contributions to psychoanalysis. He has testified before Congress numerous times on policies affecting children and families.

Since 1975, he has written four monographs and 40 books including The Course of Life: Psychoanalytic Contributions to Understanding Personality Development with G. H. Pollock in 1980, with an update in 1989–90. He has also created two videos including First Feelings, which is an introduction to his orientation into social-emotional development. Both in the popular press and in peer-reviewed articles, he has written about a wide variety of subjects that affect human development.

He wrote a book The Four Thirds Solution: Solving the Childcare Crisis in America Today, which addresses how Shared Earning/Shared Parenting Marriage supports child development.

Greenspan recently orchestrated and edited the writing of the Psychodynamic Diagnostic Manual (PDM), a new manual intended to supplement the Diagnostic and Statistical Manual (DSM) currently used to diagnose psychological disorders.

Greenspan's years of studying child development at NIMH and subsequent work successfully treating children with social-emotional delays using the DIR model is described in detail in the memoir "The Boy Who Loved Windows; Opening the Heart and Mind of a Child Threatened with Autism" written by Patricia Stacey, the mother of one of his patients. ISBN 978-0738209661. The book was based on an article Stacey wrote featuring Greenspan called "Floor Time" published in The Atlantic Monthly in February 2003.

Greenspan lived in Bethesda, Maryland, with his wife and co-author Nancy Thorndike Greenspan. He died on April 27, 2010, of complications of a stroke.

== Publications ==
- 1985. First Feelings: Milestones in the Emotional Development of Your Infant and Child from Birth to Age 4 with Nancy Thorndike Greenspan. Viking Press.
- 1989. The Development of the Ego: Implications for Personality Theory, Psychopathology, and the Psychotherapeutic Process. International Universities Press.
- 1989. The Essential Partnership: How Parents and Children Can Meet the Emotional Challenges of Infancy and Childhood with Nancy Thorndike Greenspan. Viking Penguin.
- 1992. Infancy and Early Childhood: The Practice of Clinical Assessment and Intervention with Emotional and Developmental Challenges. Madison, CT: International Universities Press.
- 1993. Playground Politics: The Emotional Development of your School-Aged Child with Jacqui Salmon. Perseus Books.
- 1995. The Challenging Child: Understanding, Raising, and Enjoying the Five "Difficult" Types of Children with Jacqui Salmon. Perseus Books. ISBN 978-0-201-44193-2 Perseus Books.
- 1997. The Child with Special Needs: Encouraging Intellectual and Emotional Growth with Serena Wieder. ISBN 978-0-201-40726-6 Perseus Books.
- 1997. The Growth of the Mind and the Endangered Origins of Intelligence with Beryl Benderly. Perseus Books.
- 1997. Developmentally Based Psychotherapy. International Universities Press.
- 1999. Building Healthy Minds: The Six Experiences that Create Intelligence and Emotional Growth in Babies and Young Children with Nancy Breslau Lewis. ISBN 978-0-7382-0063-7
- 2000. The Irreducible Needs of Children: What Every Child Must have to Grow, Learn, and Flourish. with T.B. Brazelton. Perseus Books.
- 2001. The Four Thirds Solution: Solving the Childcare Crisis in America Today. with Jacqueline Salmon. ISBN 0-7382-0200-2 Perseus Books.
- 2002.The Secure Child: Helping Our Children Feel Safe and Confident in a Changing World. Perseus Books.
- 2003. Engaging Autism: The Floortime Approach to Helping Children Relate, Communicate and Think with Serena Wieder. Perseus Books.
- 2003. The Clinical Interview of the Child. 3rd edition, with Nancy Thorndike Greenspan. ISBN 978-1-58562-137-8 American Psychiatric Publishing, Inc.
- 2004. The Greenspan Social Emotional Growth Chart: A Screening Questionnaire for Infants and Young Children. Harcourt Assessment, PsychCorp.
- 2004. The First Idea: How Symbols, Language, and Intelligence Evolved from Early Primates to Modern Humans with Stuart Shanker. ISBN 978-0-306-81449-5 Da Capo Press.
- 2006. Infant and Early Childhood Mental Health with Serena Wieder. ISBN 978-1-58562-164-4 American Psychiatric Publishing, Inc.
- 2010. The Learning Tree: Overcoming Learning Disabilities From the Ground Up with Nancy Thorndike Greenspan. ISBN 0-7382-1233-4 DaCapa Press.
- 2011. "Respecting Autism: The Rebecca School DIR Casebook for Parents and Professionals" with Gil Tippy. ISBN 0-5331-6454-0

== See also ==
- Attachment theory
- Developmental psychology
- Shared earning/shared parenting marriage
