= Celeste Watkins-Hayes =

American sociologist

Academic background
- Education: Spelman College (BA); Harvard University (MA, PhD)

Academic work
- Notable works: Remaking a Life: How Women Living with HIV/AIDS Confront Inequality and The New Welfare Bureaucrats
- Website: celestewatkinshayes.com

Celeste Watkins-Hayes is a public policy scholar and dean of the Gerald R. Ford School of Public Policy of the University of Michigan.

== Career ==
Celeste Watkins-Hayes is the Interim Dean and the founding director of the Center for Racial Justice at the University of Michigan's Gerald R. Ford School of Public Policy. She holds a University Professorship in Diversity and Social Transformation, the Jean Fairfax Collegiate Professorship in the Ford School of Public Policy, and is a professor of sociology at the University of Michigan.

Prior to her arrival at the University of Michigan, Watkins-Hayes was a professor of Sociology and African American Studies at Northwestern University, a faculty fellow at Northwestern's Institute for Policy Research, and an Associate Vice President for Research where she created the ASCEND faculty development initiative and oversaw several research centers and institutes. Watkins-Hayes is a former chair of the Department of African American Studies at Northwestern.

In addition to her academic appointments, Watkins-Hayes also served on the board of trustees at Spelman College for over a decade, where she assumed various leadership roles and led the search to identify the college's 10th president. She is a founding steering member of the Black Trustee Alliance for Art Museums, having served on the board of directors of the Detroit Institute of Arts from 2017 to 2021.

Watkins-Hayes holds a Ph.D. and M.A. in sociology from Harvard University. Her book, Remaking a Life: How Women Living with HIV/AIDS Confront Inequality, analyzes the transformation of the AIDS epidemic. In addition to her academic articles and essays, Watkins-Hayes has published pieces in The New York Times, The Atlantic, and Chicago Magazine.

== Research ==
Watkins-Hayes's research focuses on urban poverty; social policy; HIV/AIDS; non-profit and government organizations; and race, class, and gender. Her first book is The New Welfare Bureaucrats: Entanglements of Race, Class, and Policy Reform (University of Chicago Press, 2009).

Watkins-Hayes is currently principal investigator of the Health, Hardship, and Renewal Study. Her second book, Remaking a Life: How Women Living with HIV/AIDS Confront Inequality, was published by the University of California Press (August 2019).

== Honors ==
- Remaking a Life: How Women Living with HIV/AIDS Confront Inequality is the 2020 Co-Winner of the Distinguished Book Award bestowed by the American Sociological Association Section on Sex and Gender and winner of the Eliot Freidson Outstanding Publication Award from the ASA's Medical Sociology Section.
- The 2018 E. LeRoy Hall Award for Excellence in Teaching.
- The New Welfare Bureaucrats: Entanglements of Race, Class, and Policy Reform was a Finalist for the 2009 C. Wright Mills Book Award from the Society for the Study of Social Problems and the 2011 Max Weber Book Award from the American Sociological Association.

== Selected works ==
- Watkins-Hayes, Celeste (2019): Remaking a Life: How Women Living with HIV/AIDS Confront Inequality. University of California Press.
- Watkins-Hayes, Celeste (2009): The New Welfare Bureaucrats: Entanglements of Race, Class, and Policy Reform. Chicago: University of Chicago Press.
