= Kyle Pruett =

American psychiatrist

- Occupation(s): Psychiatrist, author, professor

Kyle D. Pruett is an author of books and columns on parenting, and is a professor of child psychiatry at Yale University. This researcher and practicing psychiatrist was the host of the TV series Your Child Six to Twelve with Dr. Kyle Pruett. He has contributed to Good Housekeeping, Child, and The New York Times. He has appeared as a guest on Good Morning America, Oprah, CBS This Morning, and National Public Radio.

Pruett was also the former president and board member of Zero to Three, an early childhood development organization.

== Controversies ==
Pruett has rebutted the use of his work by various opponents of same-sex marriage, saying that such usage distorted his work or was an exercise in cherry-picking.

== Publications ==
- Fatherneed: Why Father Care Is as Essential as Mother Care for Your Child - c. 2000
- Me, Myself and I: How Children Build Their Sense of Self: 18 to 36 Months - c. 1999
- The Nurturing Father: Journey Toward the Complete Man - c.1986
