= Family responsibilities discrimination in the United States =

Caregiver discrimination

Family Responsibilities Discrimination (FRD), also known as caregiver discrimination, is a form of employment discrimination toward workers who have caregiving responsibilities. Some examples of caregiver discrimination include changing an employee's schedule to conflict with their caregiving responsibilities, refusing to promote an employee, or refusing to hire an applicant.

== Background ==
=== Caregiving in the United States ===
Caregiving, such as eldercare or child care, is common in the United States. According to AARP, one in every six Americans provides care for a family member over 50. The National Caregiving Alliance states that unpaid caregivers are an increasing population. Between the years 2015 to 2020, the number of unpaid caregivers increased from 18 to 20 percent. While most caregivers are women, men and other people on the gender spectrum and of all ages comprise a significant amount of the caregiving population. Specifically, the National Caregiving Alliance states that in 2020 61 percent of family caregivers were women and 39 percent were men.

=== Effects of caregiver discrimination ===
One major factor in FRD is gender-based stereotypes and bias, which fuel adverse employment action toward workers or applicants. Often behind employer bias are assumptions about the employee that their caregiving responsibilities will impact their work. Studies show that caregiving parents faced adverse employment action, such as being less likely to be hired, offered lower salaries, and were given low ratings in areas such as competence.

There are socioeconomic and gender disparities associated with caregiver discrimination. As a result of employer assumptions based on stereotypes, caregiver discrimination has widespread economic, and health effects on workers, particularly for women, LGBTQ+ people, and low-wage workers. Overall, there is a financial impact that follows being a family caregiver. In a 2020 study of family caregivers by the National Alliance on Caregiving, 45 percent of participants reported having at least one financial impact.

=== State and Federal laws ===
Although federal law prohibits employment discrimination through a number of statutes such as the VII of the Civil Rights Act of 1964, Americans with Disabilities Act (ADA), and the Rehabilitation Act of 1973, federal law does not explicitly prohibit discrimination toward working caregivers. The Equal Employment Opportunity Commission has published enforcement guidelines on caregiver discrimination, specifically how assumptions and adverse employment action can violate current federal law. However, some states have passed laws to prohibit employers from discriminating against caregivers. These states include Alaska, Delaware, Minnesota, and New York.

== State laws ==
Alaska: Employers are prohibited from discriminating against an employee or applicant based on their parenthood status.

Delaware: Discriminating against an employee based on their family responsibilities is illegal under the Delaware Discrimination in Employment Act. Delaware code defines "family responsibilities" as responsibilities an employee has when caring for a family member who would qualify under the Family and Medical Leave Act. Employers with four or more employees are covered.

Minnesota: According to Sec. 363A.08, it is unlawful for employers to discriminate against employees based on 'family status.'

New York: Sec. 296(a) of Unlawful Discriminatory Practices includes 'familial status' under the list of protected groups for which employers cannot discriminate against.

== Federal legislative activity ==
As stated, there are currently no federal laws that explicitly prohibit FRD. Caregivers are indirectly covered under a number of federal laws stated earlier. However, lawmakers have introduced legislation. The Protecting Family Caregivers from Discrimination Act introduced by Senator Cory Booker (D-NJ) if signed into law would prohibit discrimination against employees for their caregiving responsibilities, prohibit employer retaliation if the employee seeks enforcement measures, and establish a grant program to aid in combating caregiver discrimination. This legislation has been endorsed by major advocacy organizations, such as National Employment Law Project (NELP), The National Alliance for Caregiving, and the National Women’s Law Center.

Protecting Family Caregivers from Discrimination Act Legislative History
Congress	Short Title	Bill Number	Date Introduced	Sponsors	Number of Cosponsors	Latest Status
116th Congress	Protecting Family Caregivers from Discrimination Act of 2020	S. 3878	06/03/2020	Cory Booker (D-NJ)	0	Died in Committee
117th Congress	Protecting Family Caregivers from Discrimination Act of 2022	S. 5136	11/29/2022	Cory Booker (D-NJ)	0	Died in Committee
