= 1997 in the United States =

- Decades: 1970s; 1980s; 1990s; 2000s; 2010s
- See also: History of the United States (1991–2016); Timeline of United States history (1990–2009); List of years in the United States

Events from the year 1997 in the United States.

== Incumbents ==
=== Federal government ===
- President: Bill Clinton (D-Arkansas)
- Vice President: Al Gore (D-Tennessee)
- Chief Justice: William Rehnquist (Virginia)
- Speaker of the House of Representatives: Newt Gingrich (R-Georgia)
- Senate Majority Leader: Trent Lott (R-Mississippi)
- Congress: 104th (until January 3), 105th (starting January 3)

==== State governments ====
Governors and lieutenant governors

=== Governors ===
- Governor of Alabama: Fob James (Republican)
- Governor of Alaska: Tony Knowles (Democratic)
- Governor of Arizona: Fife Symington III (Republican) (until September 5), Jane Dee Hull (Republican) (starting September 5)
- Governor of Arkansas: Mike Huckabee (Republican)
- Governor of California: Pete Wilson (Republican)
- Governor of Colorado: Roy Romer (Democratic)
- Governor of Connecticut: John G. Rowland (Republican)
- Governor of Delaware: Thomas R. Carper (Democratic)
- Governor of Florida: Lawton Chiles (Democratic)
- Governor of Georgia: Zell Miller (Democratic)
- Governor of Hawaii: Ben Cayetano (Democratic)
- Governor of Idaho: Phil Batt (Republican)
- Governor of Illinois: Jim Edgar (Republican)
- Governor of Indiana: Evan Bayh (Democratic) (until January 13), Frank O'Bannon (Democratic) (starting January 13)
- Governor of Iowa: Terry E. Branstad (Republican)
- Governor of Kansas: Bill Graves (Republican)
- Governor of Kentucky: Paul E. Patton (Democratic)
- Governor of Louisiana: Murphy J. Foster, Jr. (Republican)
- Governor of Maine: Angus King (Independent)
- Governor of Maryland: Parris N. Glendening (Democratic)
- Governor of Massachusetts: William F. Weld (Republican) (until July 29), Paul Cellucci (Republican) (starting July 29)
- Governor of Michigan: John Engler (Republican)
- Governor of Minnesota: Arne H. Carlson (Republican)
- Governor of Mississippi: Kirk Fordice (Republican)
- Governor of Missouri: Mel Carnahan (Democratic)
- Governor of Montana: Marc Racicot (Republican)
- Governor of Nebraska: Ben Nelson (Democratic)
- Governor of Nevada: Bob Miller (Democratic)
- Governor of New Hampshire: Steve Merrill (Republican) (until January 9), Jeanne Shaheen (Democratic) (starting January 9)
- Governor of New Jersey: Christine Todd Whitman (Republican)
- Governor of New Mexico: Gary Johnson (Republican)
- Governor of New York: George Pataki (Republican)
- Governor of North Carolina: Jim Hunt (Democratic)
- Governor of North Dakota: Ed Schafer (Republican)
- Governor of Ohio: George Voinovich (Republican)
- Governor of Oklahoma: Frank Keating (Republican)
- Governor of Oregon: John Kitzhaber (Democratic)
- Governor of Pennsylvania: Tom Ridge (Republican)
- Governor of Rhode Island: Lincoln C. Almond (Republican)
- Governor of South Carolina: David Beasley (Republican)
- Governor of South Dakota: William J. Janklow (Republican)
- Governor of Tennessee: Don Sundquist (Republican)
- Governor of Texas: George W. Bush (Republican)
- Governor of Utah: Mike Leavitt (Republican)
- Governor of Vermont: Howard Dean (Democratic)
- Governor of Virginia: George Allen (Republican)
- Governor of Washington: Mike Lowry (Democratic) (until January 15), Gary Locke (Democratic) (starting January 15)
- Governor of West Virginia: Gaston Caperton (Democratic) (until January 13), Cecil H. Underwood (Republican) (starting January 13)
- Governor of Wisconsin: Tommy Thompson (Republican)
- Governor of Wyoming: Jim Geringer (Republican)

=== Lieutenant governors ===
- Lieutenant Governor of Alabama: Don Siegelman (Democratic)
- Lieutenant Governor of Alaska: Fran Ulmer (Democratic)
- Lieutenant Governor of Arkansas: Winthrop Paul Rockefeller (Republican)
- Lieutenant Governor of California: Gray Davis (Democratic)
- Lieutenant Governor of Colorado: Gail Schoettler (Democratic)
- Lieutenant Governor of Connecticut: Jodi Rell (Republican)
- Lieutenant Governor of Delaware: Ruth Ann Minner (Democratic)
- Lieutenant Governor of Florida: Buddy MacKay (Democratic)
- Lieutenant Governor of Georgia: Pierre Howard (Democratic)
- Lieutenant Governor of Hawaii: Mazie Hirono (Democratic)
- Lieutenant Governor of Idaho: Butch Otter (Republican)
- Lieutenant Governor of Illinois: Bob Kustra (Republican)
- Lieutenant Governor of Indiana: Frank O'Bannon (Democratic) (until January 13), Joe E. Kernan (Democratic) (starting January 13)
- Lieutenant Governor of Iowa: Joy Corning (Republican)
- Lieutenant Governor of Kansas: Gary Sherrer (Republican)
- Lieutenant Governor of Kentucky: Steve Henry (Democratic)
- Lieutenant Governor of Louisiana: Kathleen Blanco (Democratic)
- Lieutenant Governor of Maryland: Kathleen Kennedy Townsend (Democratic)
- Lieutenant Governor of Massachusetts: Paul Cellucci (Republican)
- Lieutenant Governor of Michigan: Connie Binsfeld (Republican)
- Lieutenant Governor of Minnesota: Joanne E. Benson (Republican)
- Lieutenant Governor of Mississippi: Ronnie Musgrove (Democratic)
- Lieutenant Governor of Missouri: Roger B. Wilson (Democratic)
- Lieutenant Governor of Montana: Denny Rehberg (Republican) (until January 6), Judy Martz (Republican) (starting January 6)
- Lieutenant Governor of Nebraska: Kim Robak (Democratic)
- Lieutenant Governor of Nevada: Lonnie Hammargren (Republican)
- Lieutenant Governor of New Mexico: Walter Dwight Bradley (Republican)
- Lieutenant Governor of New York: Betsy McCaughey (Republican)
- Lieutenant Governor of North Carolina: Dennis A. Wicker (Democratic)
- Lieutenant Governor of North Dakota: Rosemarie Myrdal (Republican)
- Lieutenant Governor of Ohio: Nancy P. Hollister (Republican)
- Lieutenant Governor of Oklahoma: Mary Fallin (Republican)
- Lieutenant Governor of Pennsylvania: Mark S. Schweiker (Republican)
- Lieutenant Governor of Rhode Island: Robert Weygand (Democratic) (until January 2), Bernard Jackvony (Republican) (starting January 2)
- Lieutenant Governor of South Carolina: Bob Peeler (Republican)
- Lieutenant Governor of South Dakota: Carole Hillard (Republican)
- Lieutenant Governor of Tennessee: John S. Wilder (Democratic)
- Lieutenant Governor of Texas: Bob Bullock (Democratic)
- Lieutenant Governor of Utah: Olene S. Walker (Republican)
- Lieutenant Governor of Vermont: Barbara W. Snelling (Republican) (until month and day unknown), Doug Racine (Democratic) (starting month and day unknown)
- Lieutenant Governor of Virginia: Don Beyer (Democratic)
- Lieutenant Governor of Washington: Joel Pritchard (Republican) (until January 15), Brad Owen (Democratic) (starting January 15)
- Lieutenant Governor of Wisconsin: Scott McCallum (Republican)

== Events ==
=== January ===
January 20: Bill Clinton, the 42nd president of the United States, begins his second term.

January 20: Al Gore, the 45th vice president of the United States, begins his second term.

- January 16 – Ennis Cosby, only son of Bill and Camille Cosby, is murdered near Interstate 405, by Mikhail Markhasev.
- January 17 – A Delta II rocket carrying a military GPS payload explodes shortly after liftoff from Cape Canaveral.
- January 20 – President Bill Clinton and Vice President Al Gore begin their second term.
- January 26 – Super Bowl XXXI: The Green Bay Packers win the NFL Championship for the first time since 1967, defeating the New England Patriots 35–21 at the Louisiana Superdome in New Orleans, Louisiana.

=== February ===
- February 4 – State of the Union Address.
- February 5 – A Santa Monica jury finds former football legend O. J. Simpson liable for the deaths of Nicole Brown and Ron Goldman.
- February 8 – Motorcycle stunt rider Corey Scott is killed in front of a crowd of around 30,000 spectators at the Orange Bowl stadium in Miami, Florida, after a stunt goes terribly wrong.
- February 10 – The United States Army suspends Gene C. McKinney, Sergeant Major of the Army, its top-ranking enlisted soldier, after hearing allegations of sexual misconduct.
- February 13
  - The Dow Jones Industrial Average closes above 7,000 for the first time, gaining 60.81 to 7,022.44.
  - STS-82: Astronauts from Space Shuttle Discovery begin tune-up and repair work on the Hubble Space Telescope.
- February 23 – 1997 Empire State Building shooting: A gunman kills one person and wounds six others before taking his own life on the observation deck of the Empire State Building in Manhattan, New York City.
- February 28
  - FBI agent Earl Edwin Pitts pleads guilty to selling secrets to Soviet Union.
  - North Hollywood shootout: Two heavily armed bank robbers conflict with officers from the Los Angeles Police Department in a mass shootout.

=== March ===
- March 4 – U.S. President Bill Clinton bars federal funding for any research on human cloning.
- March 9 – 24-year-old Brooklyn rapper The Notorious B.I.G. is killed in a drive-by shooting shortly after leaving a Vibe magazine party at the Petersen Automotive Museum in Los Angeles before the release of his second album Life After Death. The album is released on March 25.
- March 13 – The Phoenix Lights are seen over Phoenix, Arizona.
- March 14 – A famous study of gender reassignment of a twin boy who lost his penis to a botched circumcision is refuted. The supposedly successful outcome for "Joan" had been widely cited as proof that gender was determined by nurture, yet the patient, David Reimer, was deeply unhappy and had returned to his original gender by the age of 15, thus indicating the exact opposite thesis.
- March 21 – Liar Liar is released in theaters nationwide, later going on to rank as the 7th highest grossing film of the year.
- March 23 – The World Wrestling Federation holds WrestleMania 13 from the Rosemont Horizon in Rosemont, Illinois.
- March 24 – The 69th Academy Awards, hosted by Billy Crystal, are held at Shrine Auditorium in Los Angeles, with Anthony Minghella's The English Patient winning nine awards out of 12 nominations, including Best Picture and Best Director. The telecast garners nearly 40.1 million viewers.
- March 26 – In San Diego, California, 39 Heaven's Gate cultists commit mass suicide at their compound.

=== April ===
- April 15 – Jackie Robinson's number 42 is retired across all Major League Baseball teams.
- April 16 – Houston socialite Doris Angleton is murdered, drawing suspicion to her estranged husband, Robert. His brother Roger confesses to the crime and the investigation reveals that Robert had amassed a fortune through illegal betting.
- April 18 – The Red River of the North breaks through dikes and floods Grand Forks, North Dakota and East Grand Forks, Minnesota, causing US$2 billion in damage.

=== May ===
- May – For the first time since December 1973, unemployment falls below 5%. It would remain below 5% until September 2001, during the early 2000s recession.
- May 2 – The Franklin Delano Roosevelt Memorial is dedicated in Washington, D.C.
- May 15 – The United States government acknowledges existence of the "Secret War" in Laos, and dedicates the Laos Memorial in honor of Hmong and other "Secret War" veterans.
- May 16 – U.S. President Bill Clinton issues a formal apology to the surviving victims of the Tuskegee Study of Untreated Syphilis in the Negro Male and their families.
- May 22 – Kelly Flinn, the U.S. Air Force's first female bomber pilot certified for combat, accepts a general discharge in order to avoid a court martial.
- May 25 – Strom Thurmond becomes the longest-serving member in the history of the United States Senate (41 years and 10 months).
- May 27 – The second-deadliest tornado of the 1990s hits in Jarrell, Texas, killing 27 people.

=== June ===
- June 2 – In Denver, Colorado, Timothy McVeigh is convicted on 15 counts of murder and conspiracy for his role in the 1995 Oklahoma City bombing.
- June 6 – In Lacey Township, New Jersey, high school senior Melissa Drexler gives birth in a toilet and leaves the newborn for dead in the trash.
- June 7
  - A computer user known as "_eci" publishes his C source code on a Windows 95 and Windows NT exploit, which later becomes WinNuke. The source code gets wide distribution across the internet, and Microsoft is forced to release a security patch.
  - The Detroit Red Wings win their first Stanley Cup championship in 42 years, defeating the Philadelphia Flyers 4 games to 0. Red Wings goaltender Mike Vernon is awarded the Conn Smythe Trophy as playoff MVP.
- June 8 – A United States Coast Guard helicopter crashes near Humboldt Bay, California; all four crew members perish.
- June 12 – The United States Department of the Treasury unveils a new $50 bill, meant to be more difficult to counterfeit.
- June 13 – A jury sentences Timothy McVeigh to death for his part in the 1995 Oklahoma City bombing.
- June 19 – The fast food chain McDonald's wins a partial victory in its libel trial, known as the "McLibel case", against two environmental campaigners. The judge agrees that McDonald's targeted its advertising at children, who pestered their parents into visiting the company's restaurants.
- June 25 – The NHL announces the addition of four new franchises to be added to the league by the 2000-01 NHL season.
- June 27 – Walt Disney Pictures' 35th feature film, Hercules, loosely based on the legendary mythological hero of the same name, is released to positive reviews but underperforms at the box office in comparison to its most recent predecessors.
- June 28 – During the Evander Holyfield vs. Mike Tyson II boxing match in Las Vegas, Mike Tyson bites off part of Evander Holyfield's ear.

=== July ===
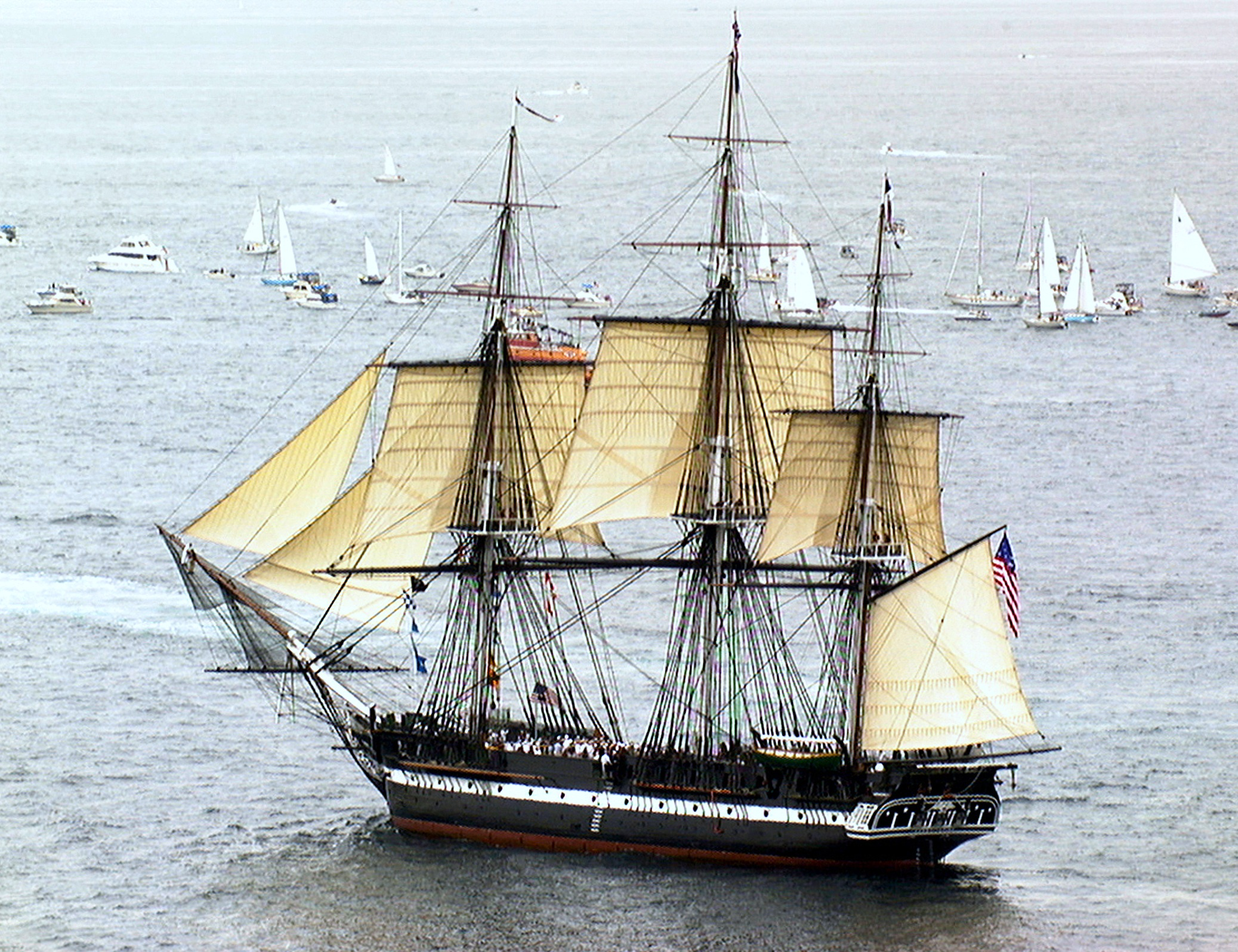
July 21: USS Constitution under sail

- July 2 – Men in Black is released in theaters.
- July 4 – NASA's Pathfinder space probe lands on the surface of Mars.
- July 15 – Spree killer Andrew Cunanan shoots fashion designer Gianni Versace to death outside Versace's Miami Beach, Florida, residence.
- July 16 – The Dow Jones Industrial Average gains 63.17 to close at 8,038.88. It is the Dow's first close above 8,000. The Dow has doubled its value in 30 months.
- July 18 – The first Speedway gas station opens in Ohio.
- July 21 – The fully restored USS Constitution (aka "Old Ironsides") celebrates her 200th birthday by setting sail for the first time in 116 years.
- July 23 – Digital Equipment Corporation files antitrust charges against chipmaker Intel.

=== August ===
August 6: ATC radio traffic after Korean Air Flight 801 crashed in Guam

- August 1 – Steve Jobs returns to Apple Computer, Inc at Macworld in Boston.
- August 3 – The World Wrestling Federation holds its SummerSlam event from the Continental Airlines Arena in East Rutherford, New Jersey.
- August 6 – Microsoft buys a $150 million share of financially troubled Apple Computer.
- August 6 – Korean Air Flight 801 crashes while attempting to land in the U.S. territory of Guam, killing 229.
- August 13 – Trey Parker and Matt Stone's South Park aired its first episode on Comedy Central; it would go on to become one of the most infamous and celebrated sitcoms ever made.
- August 29 – Netflix, Inc., a DVD-by-mail rental business, is founded by Marc Randolph and Reed Hastings in Scotts Valley, California.

=== September ===
- September 4 – In Lorain, Ohio, the last Ford Thunderbird for three years rolls off the assembly line.
- September 15 – www.google.com is registered by Google.
- September 29 – The Forced Abortion Condemnation Act is introduced in the U.S. Congress.
- September 30 – Facing increasing shifts to the use of GPS, the Omega radio navigation system is deactivated.

=== October ===
- October 1 – Luke Woodham walks into Pearl High School in Pearl, Mississippi and opens fire, killing two girls, after killing his mother earlier that morning.
- October 4
  - One million men gather for Promise Keepers' "Stand in the Gap" event in Washington, DC.
  - Loomis Fargo Bank Robbery: The second largest cash robbery in U.S. history ($17.3 million, mostly in small bills) occurs at the Charlotte, North Carolina, office of Wells Fargo. An FBI investigation eventually results in 24 convictions and the recovery of approximately 95% of the stolen cash.
- October 15
  - Andy Green sets the first supersonic land speed record for the ThrustSSC team, led by Richard Noble of the UK. ThrustSSC goes through the flying mile course at Black Rock Desert, Nevada, at an average speed of 1,227.985 km/h (763.035 mph).
  - NASA launches the Cassini-Huygens probe to Saturn.
- October 16 – The first color photograph appears on the front page of The New York Times.
- October 19 – Thirteen-year-old Maryann Measles is abducted while waiting for her mother in the parking lot of a New Milford, Connecticut shopping center. Eight former friends then take part in her beating, gang-rape, and murder, ultimately dumping her body into the Housatonic River. The gruesome crime attracts national attention due to its brutality and the age of the victim.
- October 26 – 1997 World Series: The Florida Marlins defeat the Cleveland Indians.
- October 27 – Stock markets around the world crash due to a global economic crisis scare. The Dow Jones Industrial Average follows suit and plummets 554.26, or 7.18%, to 7,161.15. The points loss exceeds the loss from Black Monday. Officials at the New York Stock Exchange for the first time invoke the "circuit breaker" rule to stop trading.
- October 28 – In the U.S., the Dow Jones Industrial Average gains a record 337.17 points, closing at 7,498.32. One billion shares are traded on the New York Stock Exchange for the first time ever.
- October 30 – In Newton, Massachusetts, British au pair Louise Woodward is found guilty of the baby-shaking death of 8-month-old Matthew Eappen.

=== November ===
- November – The unemployment rate drops to 4.6%, the lowest since October 1973.
- November 10
  - Telecom companies WorldCom and MCI Communications announce a US$37 billion merger to form MCI WorldCom (the largest merger in U.S. history).
  - A Fairfax, Virginia, jury finds Mir Qazi guilty of murdering two CIA employees in 1993.
- November 12 – Ramzi Yousef is found guilty of masterminding the 1993 World Trade Center bombing.
- November 14 – Mary Kay Letourneau is sentenced to six months imprisonment in Washington after pleading guilty to two counts of second-degree child rape. Letourneau gave birth to her victims' child and the leniency of her sentence was widely criticized.
- November 19 – In Des Moines, Iowa, Bobbi McCaughey gives birth to septuplets in the second known case where all seven babies are born alive, and the first in which all survive infancy.
- November 27
  - The 71st Macy's Thanksgiving Day Parade takes place in New York City. High winds cause a balloon to knock loose a piece of a lamppost, injuring four, one nearly fatally. Police deflate other balloons by force.
  - NASA's Tropical Rainfall Measuring Mission is launched, the start of the satellite component of the Clouds and the Earth's Radiant Energy System.

=== December ===
- December 1 – Michael Carneal opens fire on a prayer group at Heath High School in West Paducah, Kentucky, killing three and injuring five.
- December 3 – In Ottawa, Ontario, Canada, representatives from 121 countries sign a treaty prohibiting the manufacture and deployment of anti-personnel land mines. However, the United States, the People's Republic of China, and Russia do not sign the treaty.
- December 18 – Comedian and Saturday Night Live actor Chris Farley is found dead from a drug overdose in his apartment on the 60th floor at John Hancock Center in Chicago, Illinois.
- December 19 – James Cameron's Titanic, the highest-grossing film of all time until Avatar (2009), premieres in the U.S.

=== Ongoing ===
- Iraqi no-fly zones (1991–2003)
- Dot-com bubble (c. 1995–c. 2000)

== Births ==
=== January ===
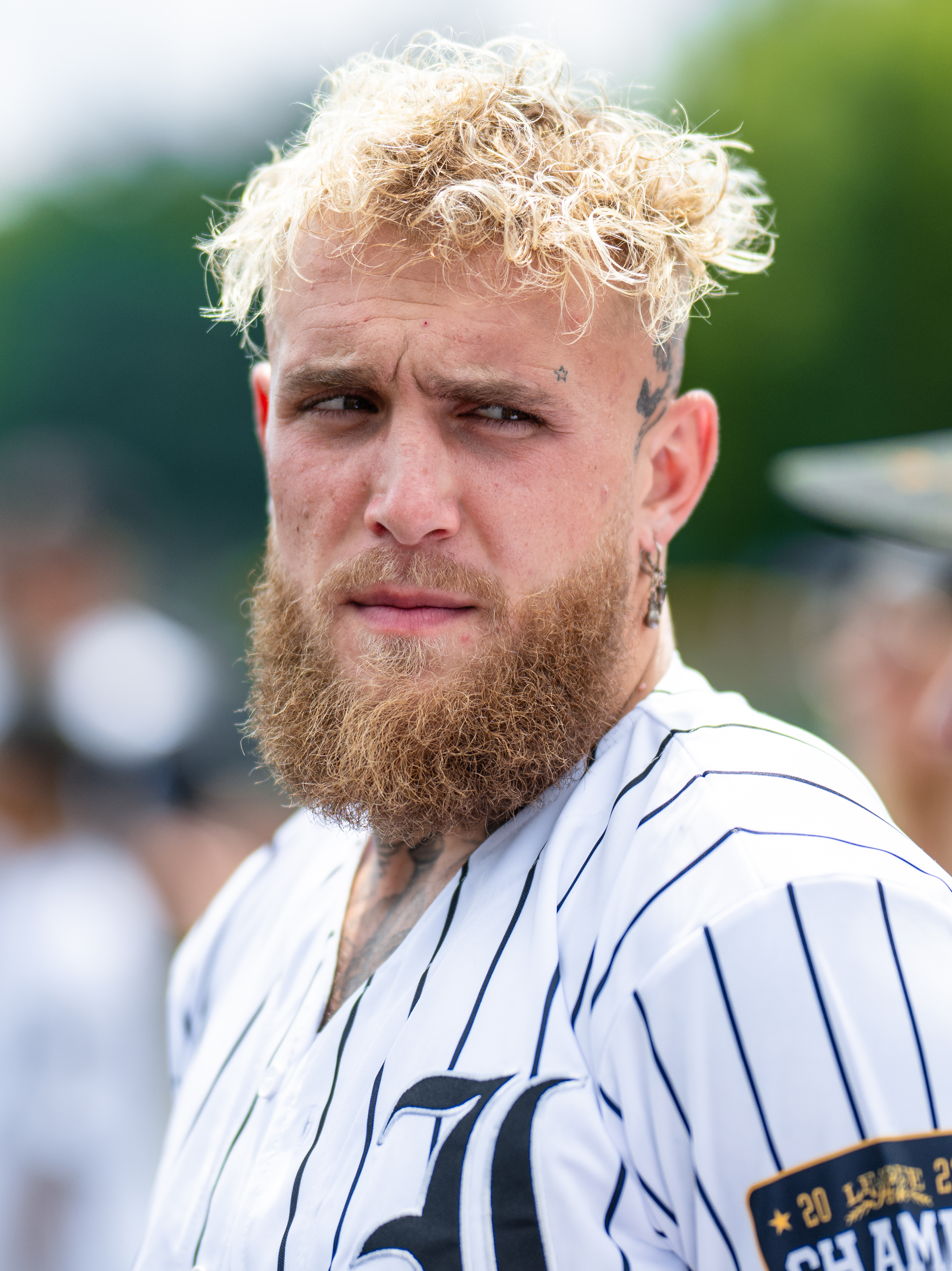
Jake Paul

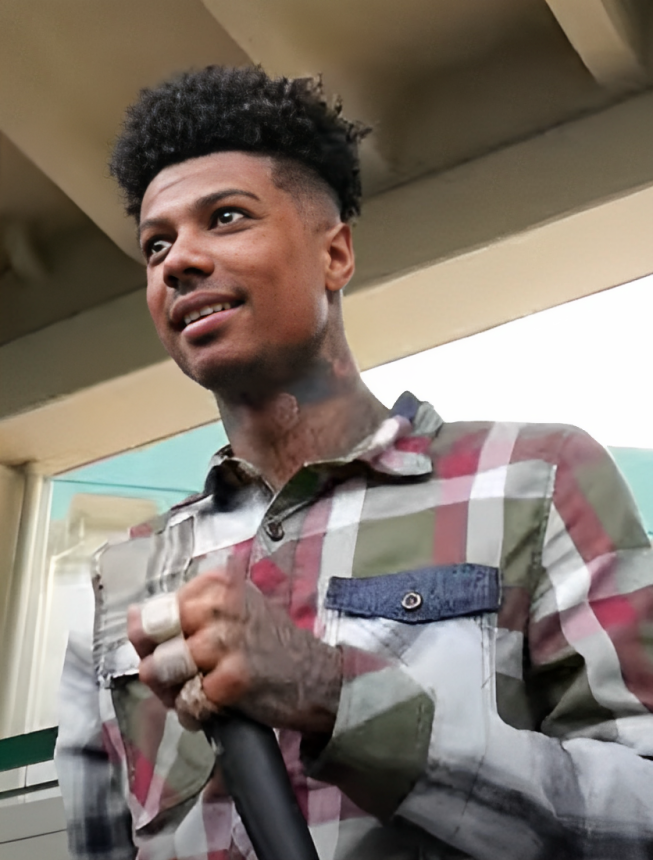
Blueface

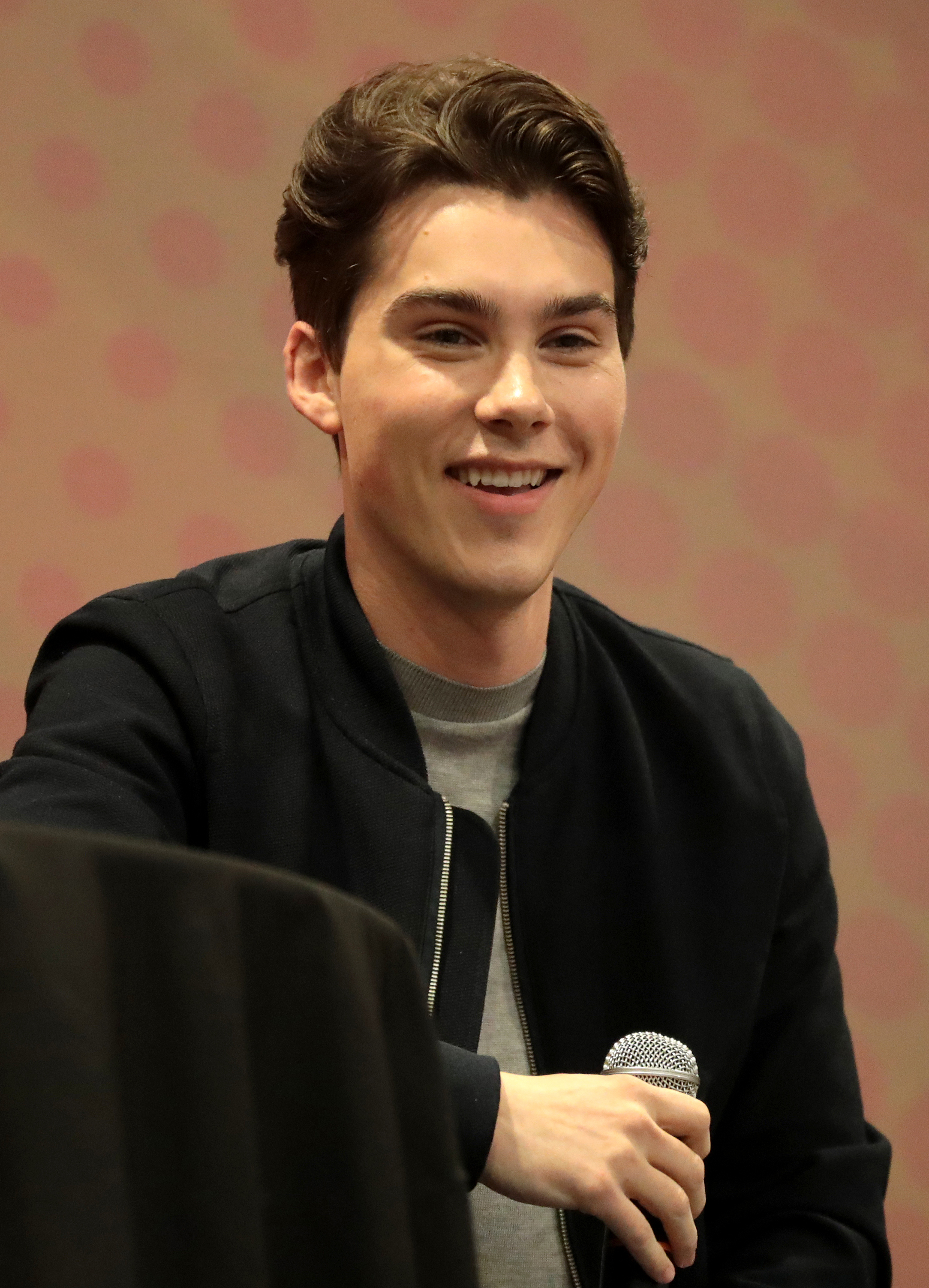
Jeremy Shada

- January 4 – CJ, rapper
- January 7 – Lamar Jackson, football player
- January 8 – Jack Andraka, inventor
- January 13
  - Lori Harvey, model and entrepreneur
  - Jimmy Wopo, rapper (d. 2018)
- January 14 – Joey Luthman, actor
- January 17
  - Shea Patterson, football player
  - Jake Paul, boxer
  - Kyle Tucker, baseball player
- January 20 – Blueface, rapper
- January 21 – Jeremy Shada, actor and singer
- January 23
  - Lexie Priessman, gymnast
- January 24
  - Jonah Bobo, actor
  - Dylan Riley Snyder, actor, singer, and dancer
- January 25 – Noah Hanifin, ice hockey player
- January 26 – Gedion Zelalem, soccer player
- January 27 – Peyton Ernst, artistic gymnast
- January 29 – Jack Roslovic, ice hockey player

=== February ===
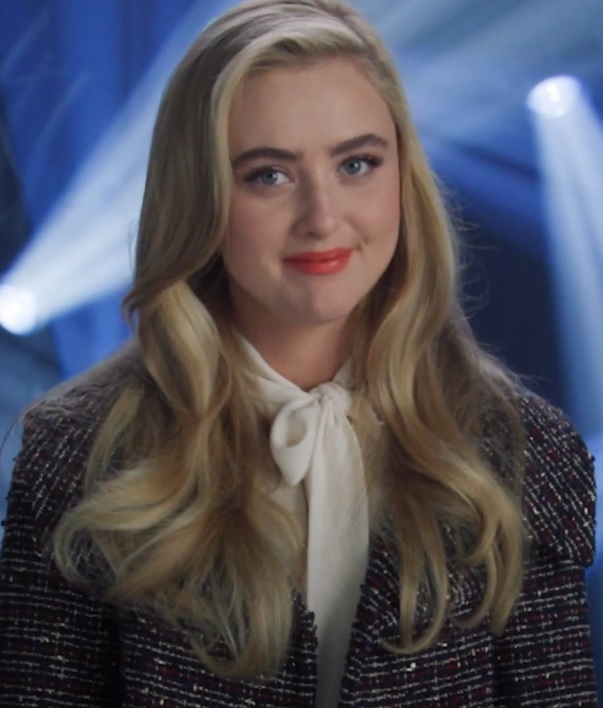
Kathryn Newton

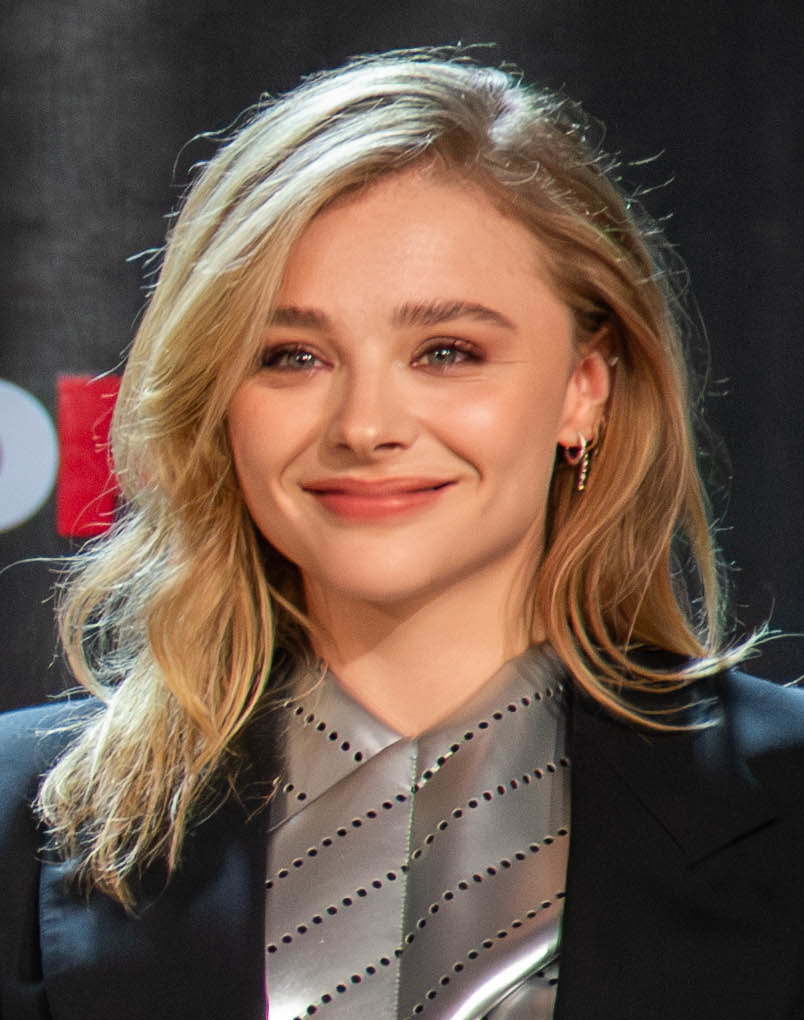
Chloë Grace Moretz

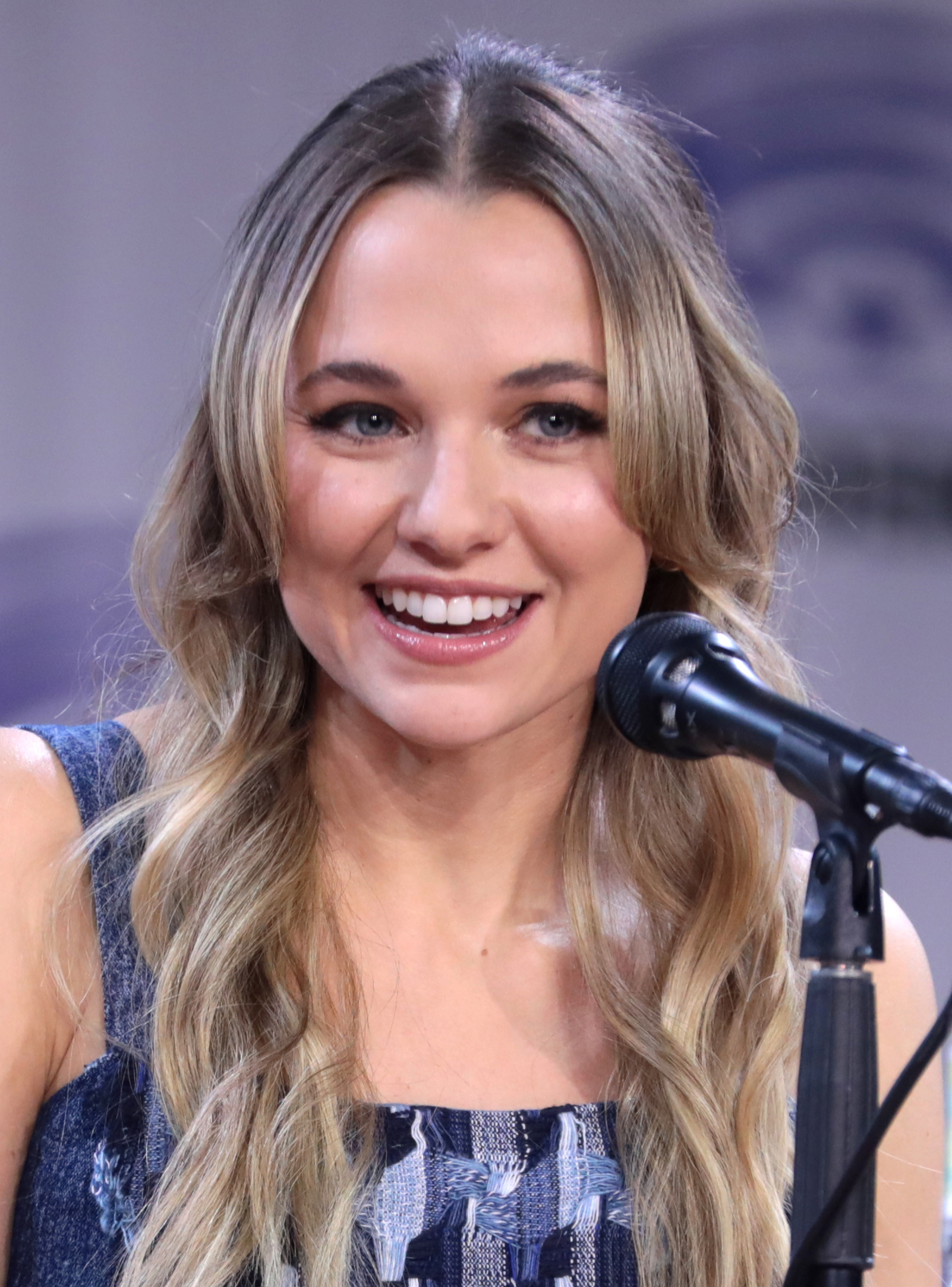
Madison Iseman

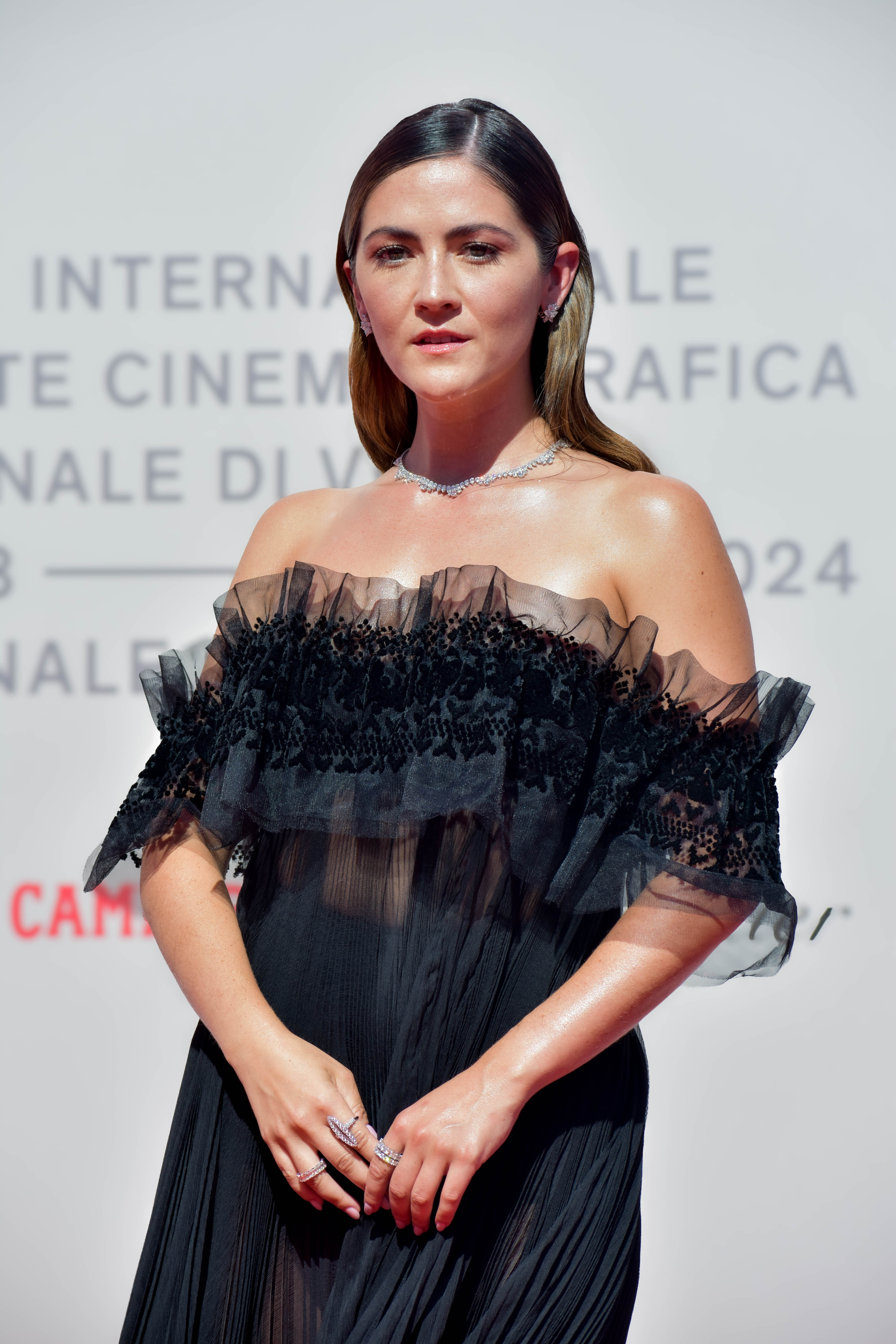
Isabelle Fuhrman

- February 6 – Mitch Hyatt, football player
- February 7
  - Saquon Barkley, football player
  - Matthew Gumley, actor
- February 8 – Kathryn Newton, actress
- February 9
  - Jaire Alexander, football player
  - Bella Poarch, tiktoker
- February 10
  - Josh Jackson, basketball player
  - Lilly King, swimmer
  - Chloë Grace Moretz, actress
  - Josh Rosen, football player
  - Isabella Wright, Olympic Alpine ski racer
- February 11
  - Damien Harris, football player
  - Mike Hughes, football player
- February 12 – Shane Baumel, actor
- February 13 – Deondre Francois, football player
- February 14 – Madison Iseman, actress
- February 15
  - Myles Gaskin, football player
  - Derrick Jones Jr., basketball player
- February 20 – Mitchie Brusco, skateboarder
- February 21 – Ben Rhodes, stock car racing driver
- February 25
  - Brock Boeser, ice hockey player
  - Isabelle Fuhrman, actress
- February 26 – Aidan Gould, actor

=== March ===
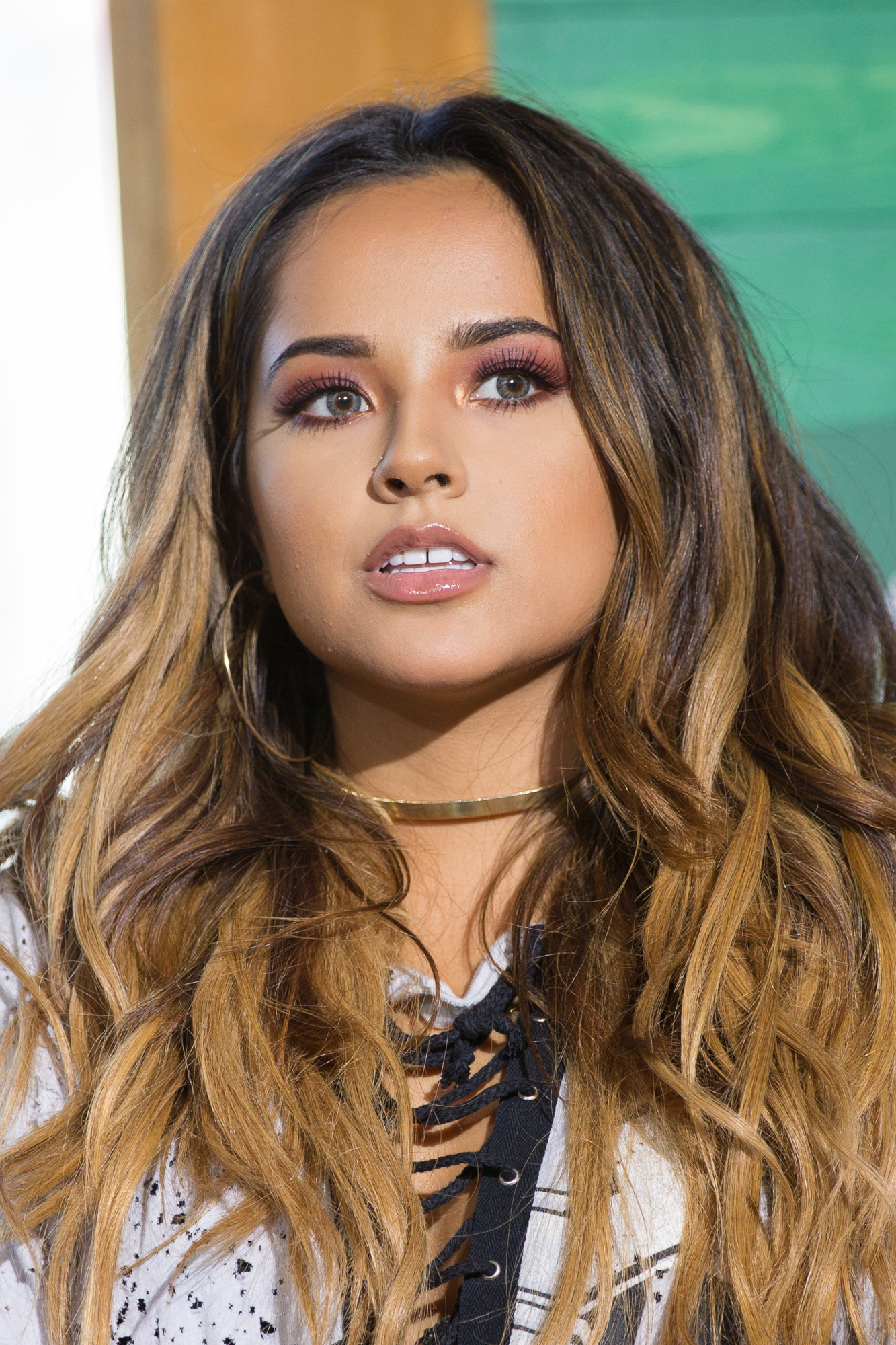
Becky G

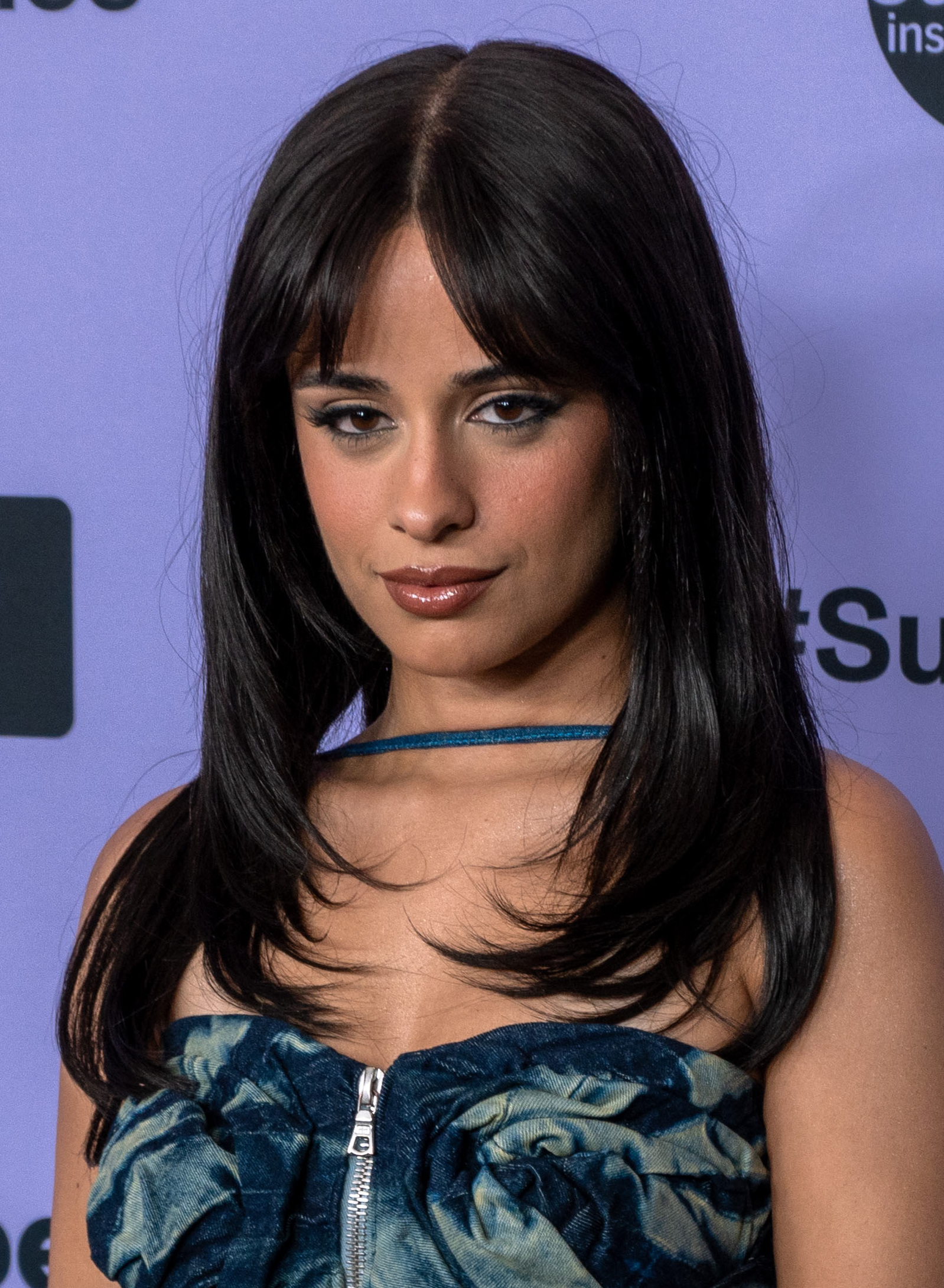
Camila Cabello

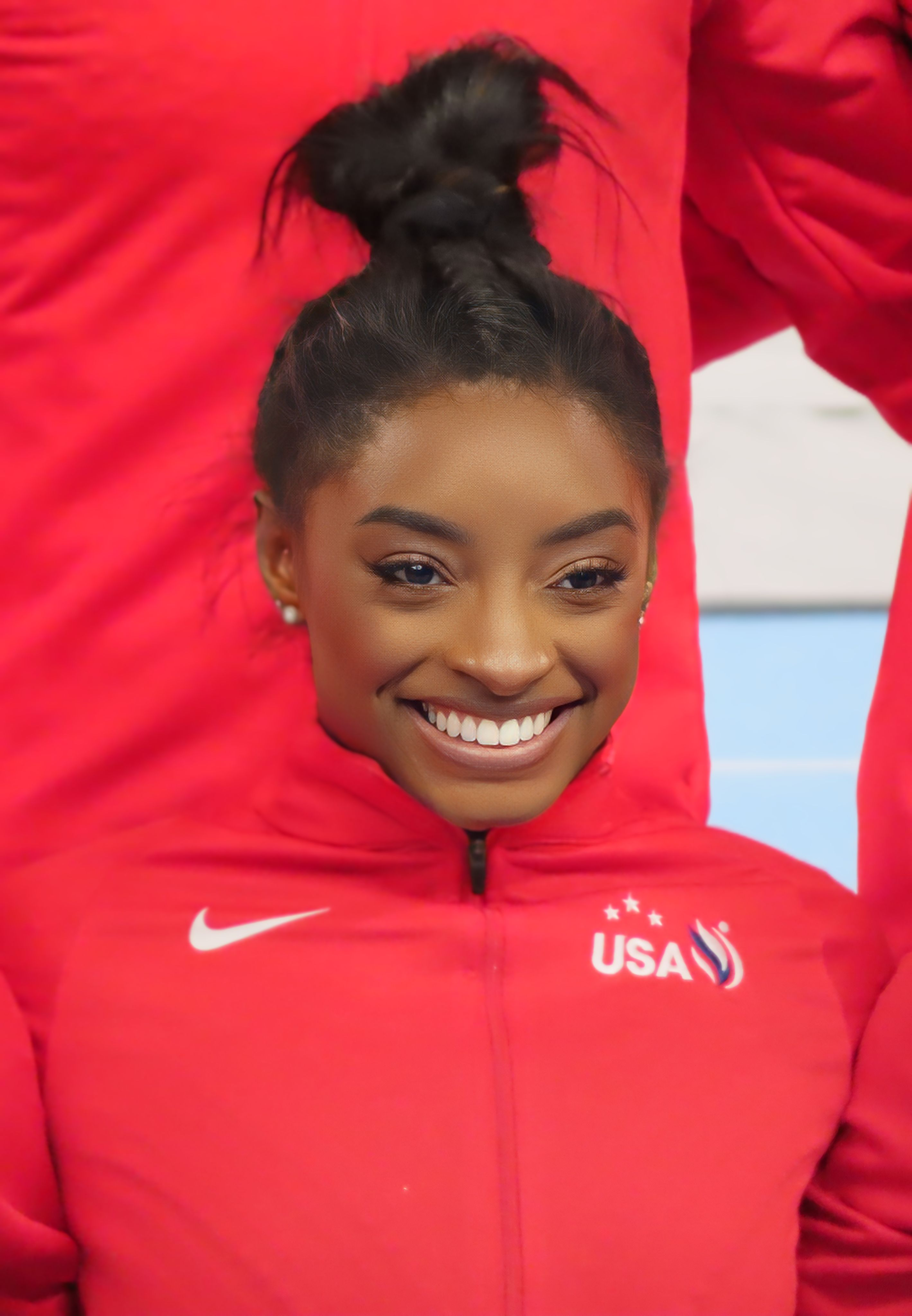
Simone Biles

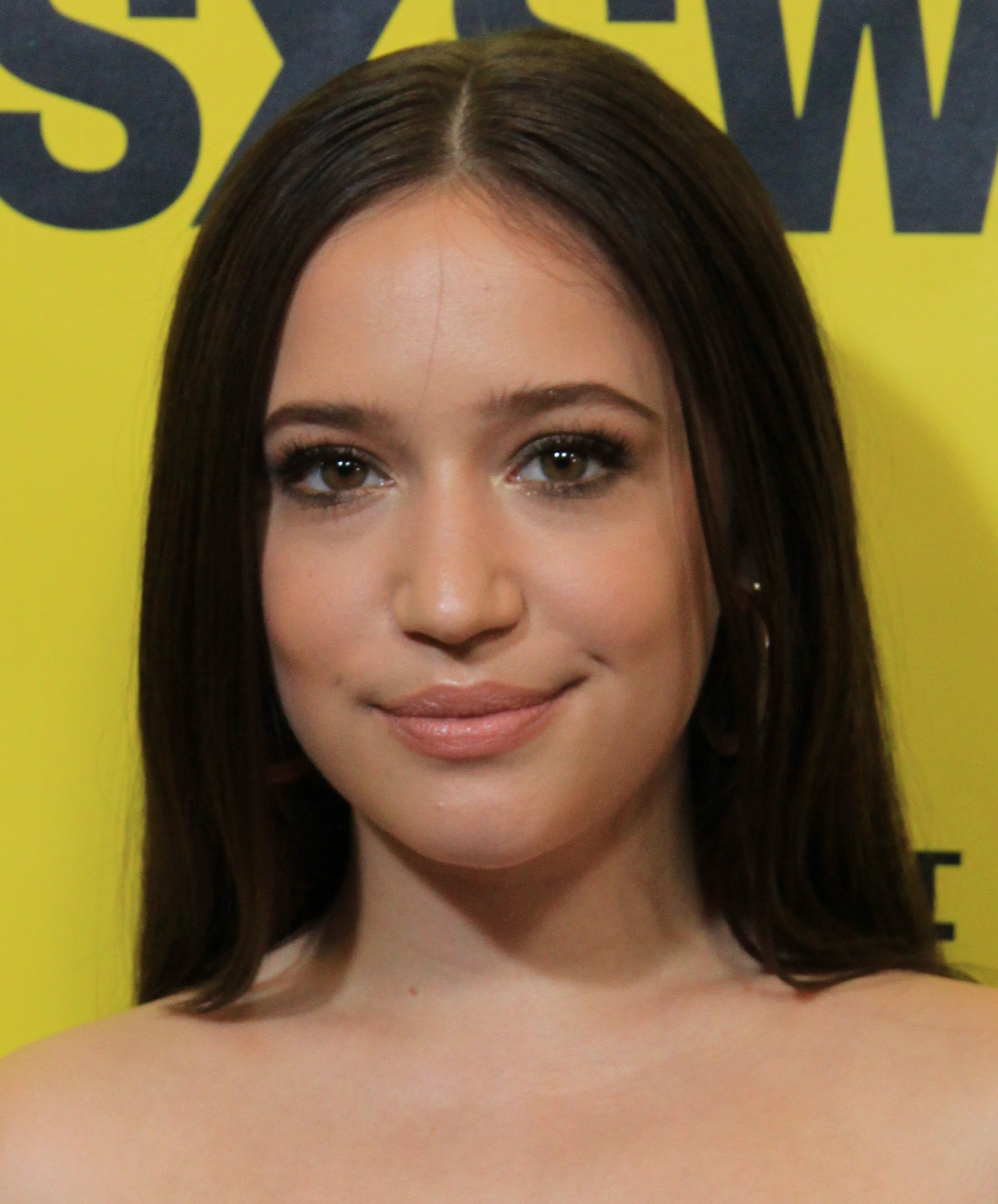
Gideon Adlon

- March 2
  - Becky G, singer
  - Lizzy LeDuc, American-born Filipino artistic gymnast
- March 3
  - Camila Cabello, Cuban-born singer
  - Channing "Stacks" Lorenzo, wrestler
  - Ty Walker, Olympic snowboarder
- March 5 – Jonathan Gustafson, Olympic luger
- March 9
  - Chika, rapper
  - Jessica Rogers, wheelchair athlete
- March 10 – Uriah Shelton, actor and singer
- March 11 – Jake Ilardi, skateboarder
- March 14 – Simone Biles, Olympic artistic gymnast
- March 16 – Tyrel Jackson Williams, actor
- March 17 – Katie Ledecky, swimmer
- March 18 – Ciara Bravo, actress and singer
- March 20 – Wifisfuneral, rapper
- March 25 – Aaron Monteiro, football player
- March 26 – Cameron Smith, football player
- March 29 – Josh Sweat, football player
- March 30 – Gideon Adlon, actress

=== April ===
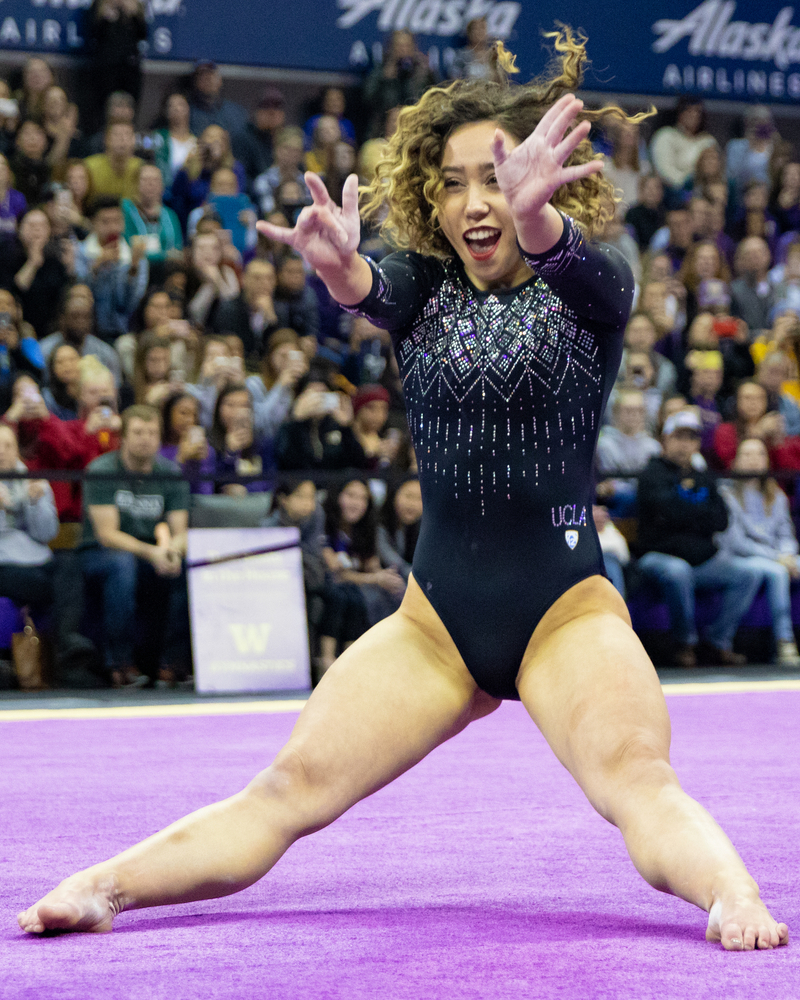
Katelyn Ohashi

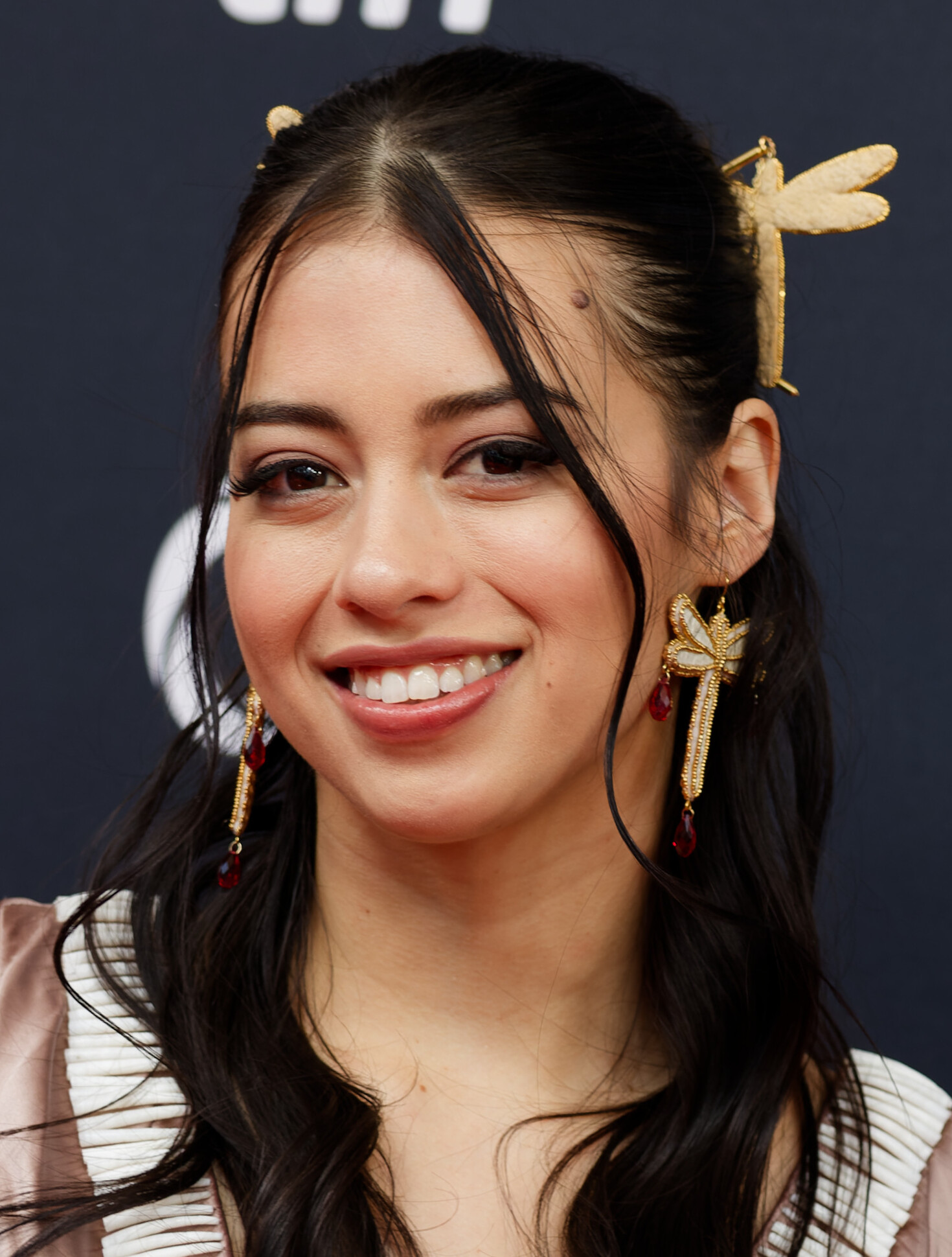
Amber Midthunder

- April 2 – Zak Ketterson, Olympic cross-country skier
- April 5 – Dominik Mysterio, wrestler
- April 8 – Roquan Smith, football player
- April 9 – Brianna Kupfer, murder victim (d. 2022)
- April 10 – Claire Wineland, activist and author (d. 2018)
- April 12
  - Jacob Clemente, actor and dancer
  - Katelyn Ohashi, artistic gymnast
- April 15 – Donavan Brazier, middle-distance runner
- April 18 – Caleb Swanigan, basketball player (d. 2022)
- April 23 – Andrew Callaghan, journalist
- April 26 – Amber Midthunder, actress

=== May ===
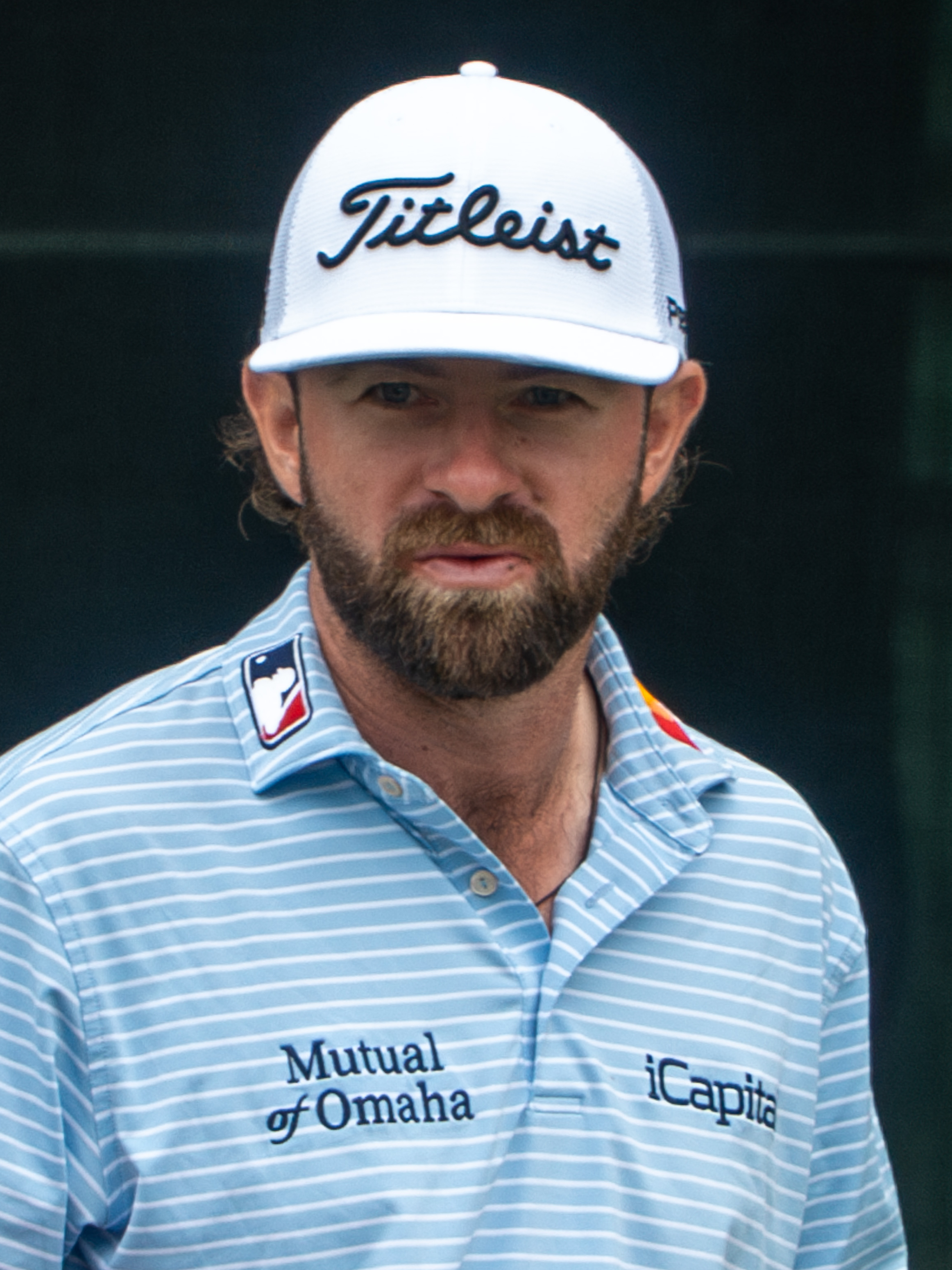
Cameron Young

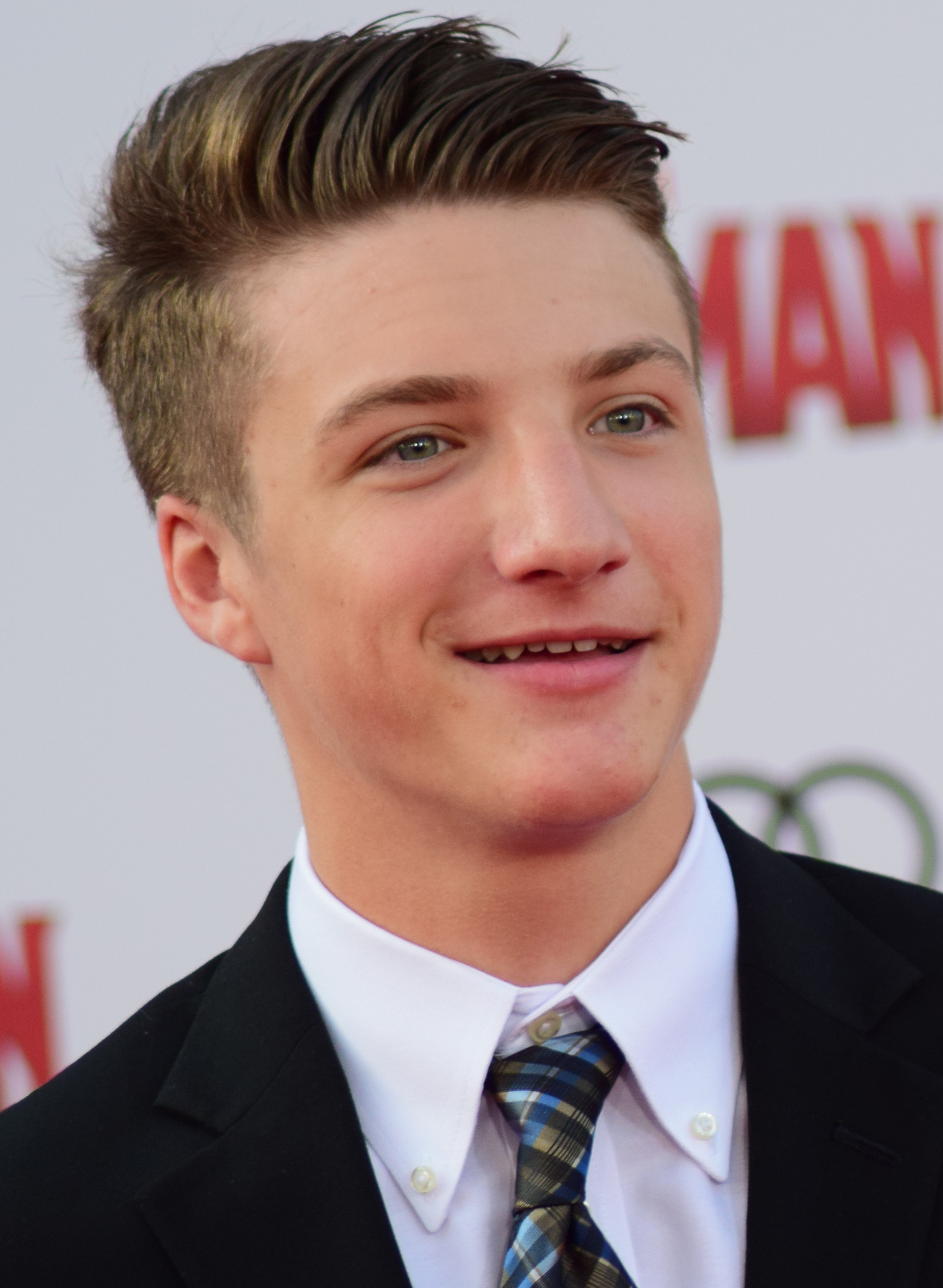
Jake Short

- May 1 – Ariel Gade, actress
- May 2 – Perla Haney-Jardine, Brazilian-born actress
- May 3
  - Desiigner, rapper
  - Dwayne Haskins, football player (d. 2022)
- May 6 – Lash Legend, wrestler
- May 7 – Cameron Young, golfer
- May 9 – Zane Huett, actor
- May 10 – Brittany Broski, internet personality
- May 11 – Coi Leray, musician
- May 12
  - Odeya Rush, Israeli-born actress
  - Ruben Sim, YouTuber
- May 14
  - Riley Griffiths, actor
  - Chloe Troast, actress
- May 15
  - Precious Doe, murder victim (d. 2001)
  - Smokepurpp, rapper
- May 19 – Maxxine Dupri, wrestler
- May 21 – Kevin Quinn, actor and singer
- May 23
  - Coy Craft, soccer player
  - Kiana James, wrestler
- May 27 – Daniel Jones, football player
- May 30
  - Peter Lenz, motorcycle racer (d. 2010)
  - Jake Short, actor

=== June ===
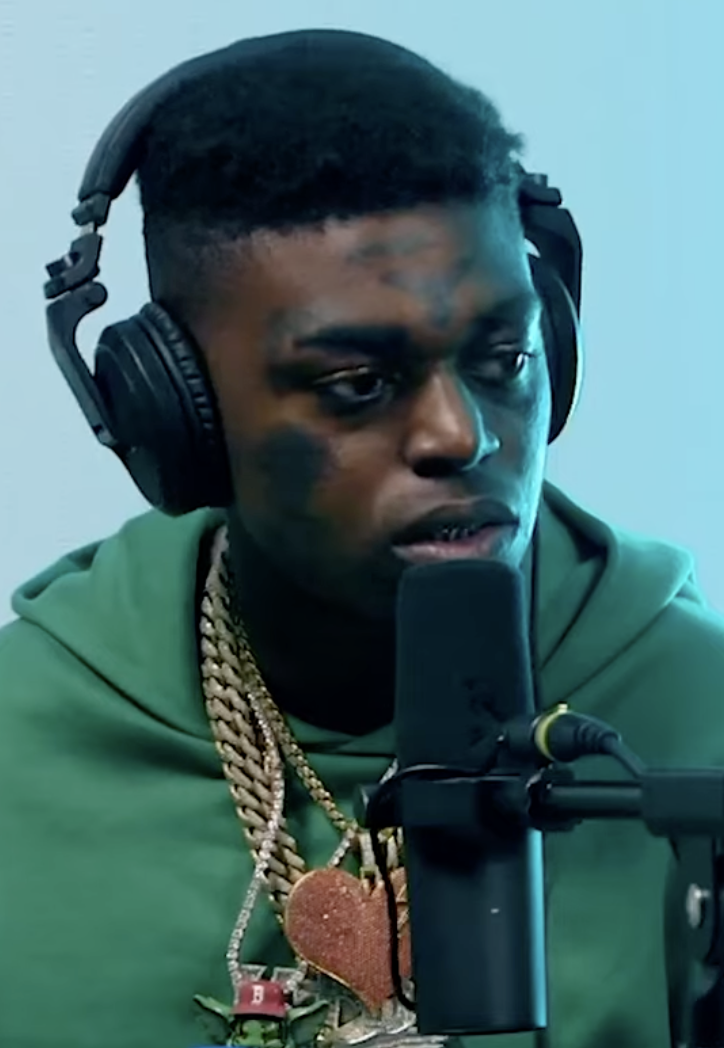
Kodak Black

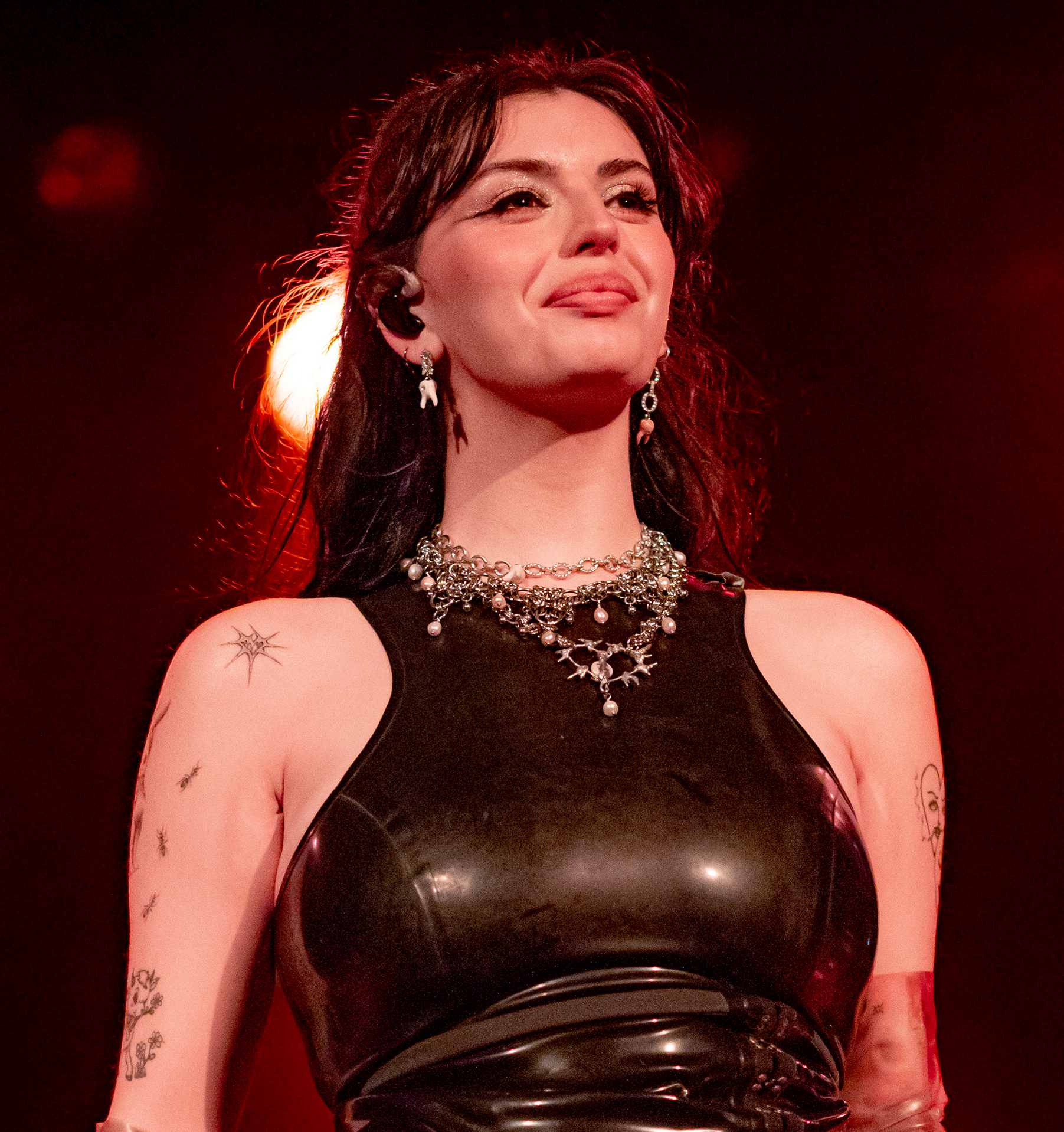
Rebecca Black

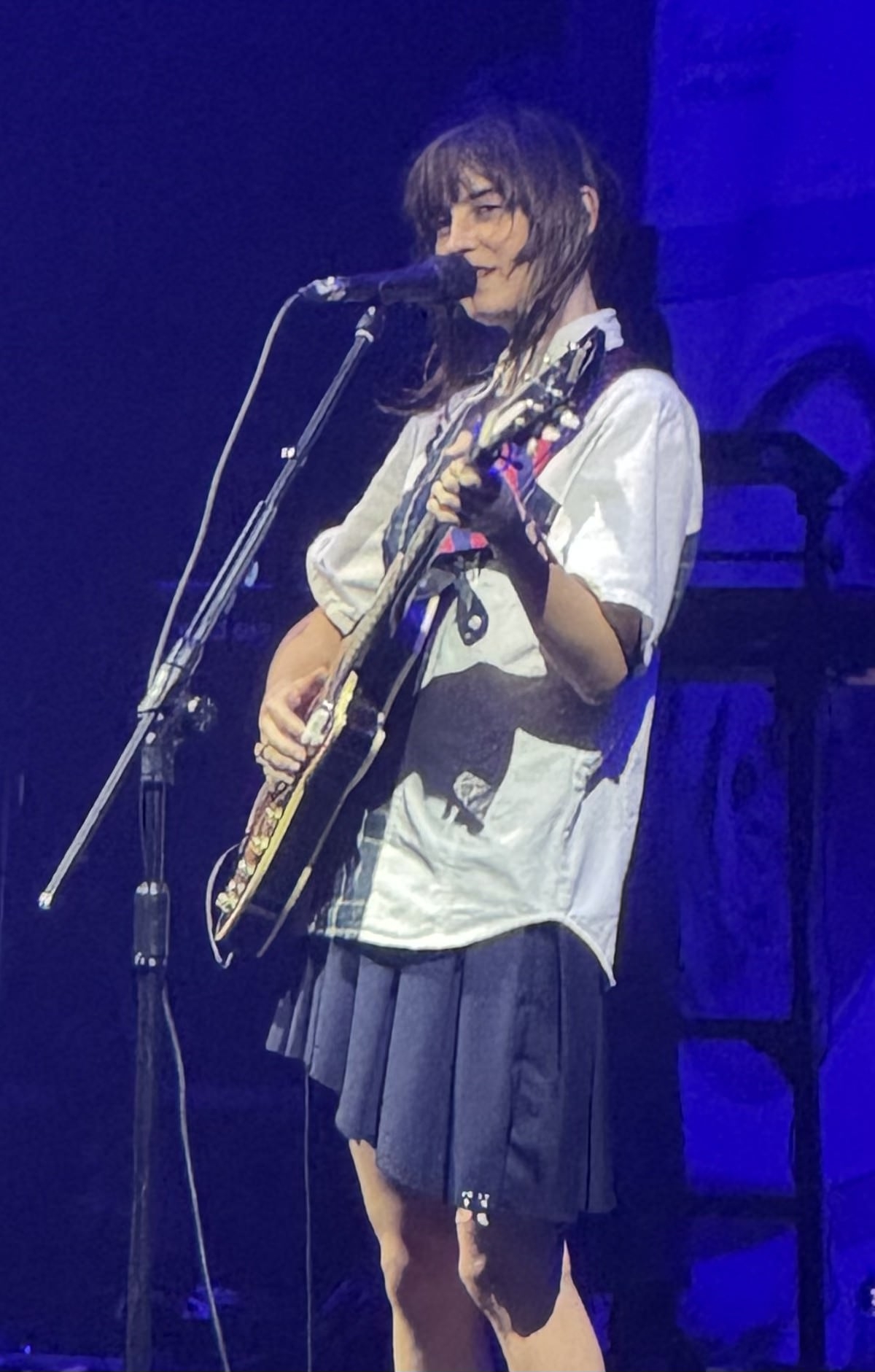
Faye Webster

- June 11
  - Kodak Black, rapper
  - Kameron Marlowe, country singer/songwriter
  - John Hunter Nemechek, stock car racing driver
  - Sadie Robertson, television personality and evangelical writer
- June 12 – Ashley Cooke, singer
- June 13 – Katie Lou Samuelson, basketball player
- June 15 – Madison Kocian, Olympic artistic gymnast
- June 20 – Maria Lark, Russian-born actress
- June 21 – Rebecca Black, singer
- June 25 – Faye Webster, singer
- June 29 – Arianna Grace, wrestler

=== July ===
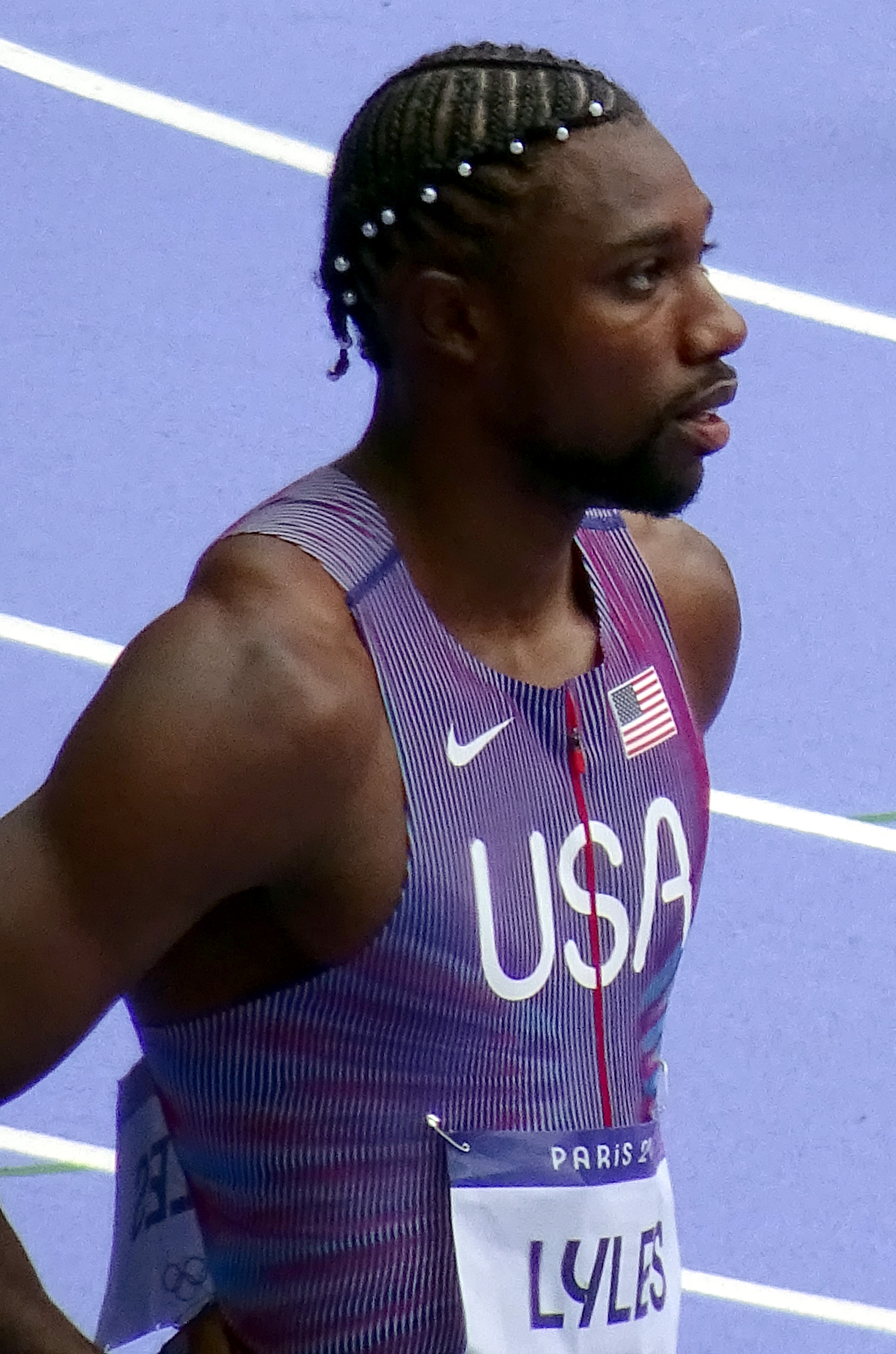
Noah Lyles

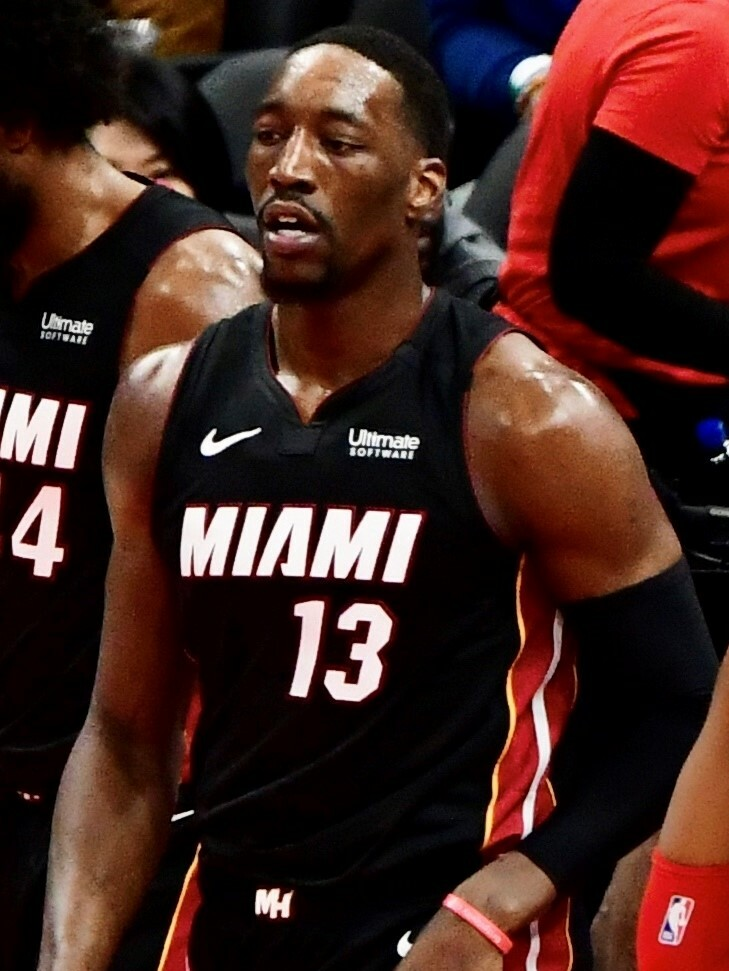
Bam Adebayo

- July 13 – Leo Howard, actor
- July 15 – Noah Lyles, Olympic sprinter
- July 18 – Bam Adebayo, basketball player
- July 19 – Zach Werenski, ice hockey player
- July 20 – Billi Bruno, actress
- July 22 – Field Cate, actor
- July 23 – Faresa Kapisi, track and field athlete
- July 27 – G'Angelo Hancock, wrestler
- July 28 – Gabbriette, model and musician
- July 30 – Finneas O'Connell, singer
- July 31 – Bobbi Althoff, internet personality

=== August ===
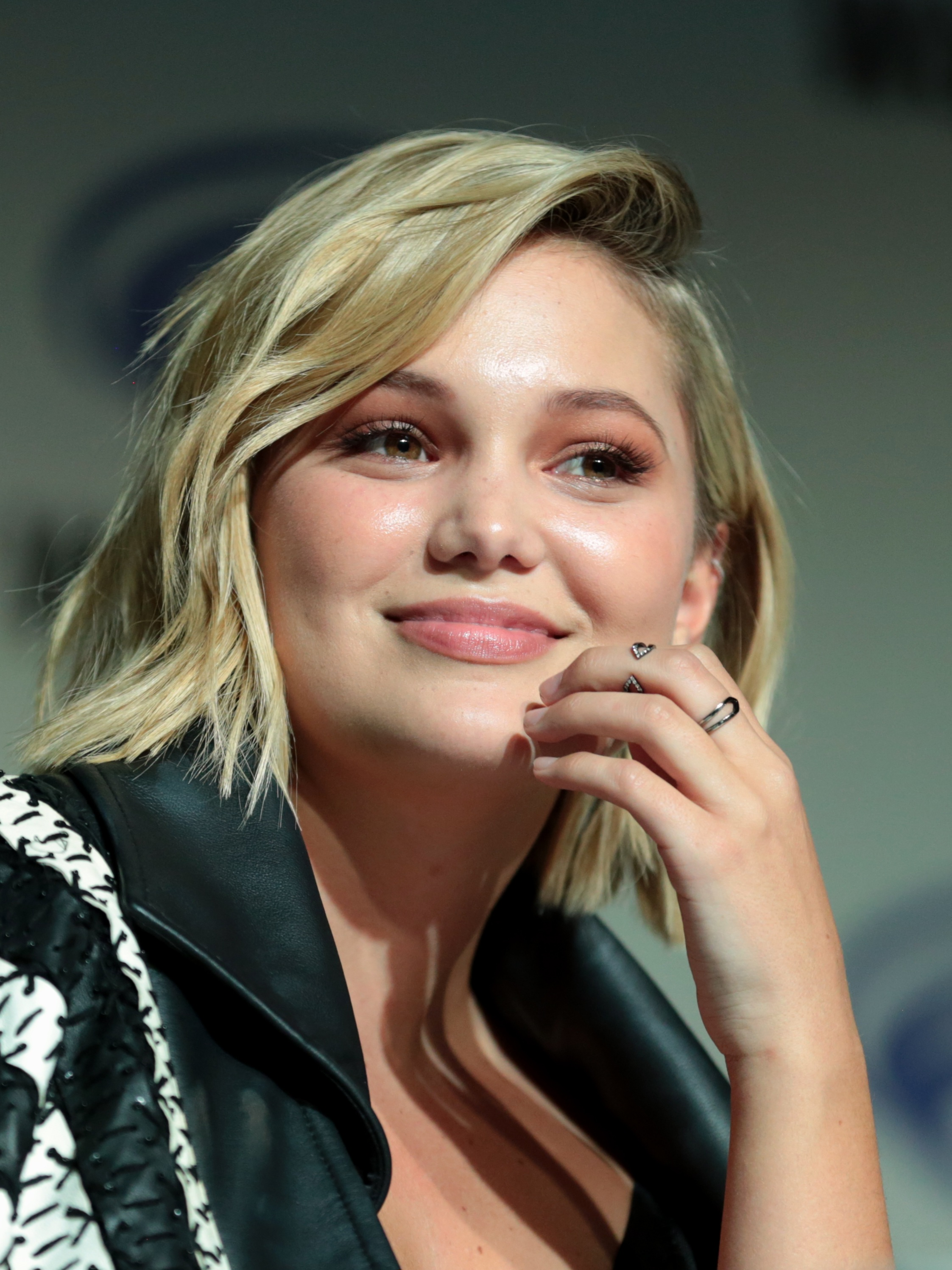
Olivia Holt

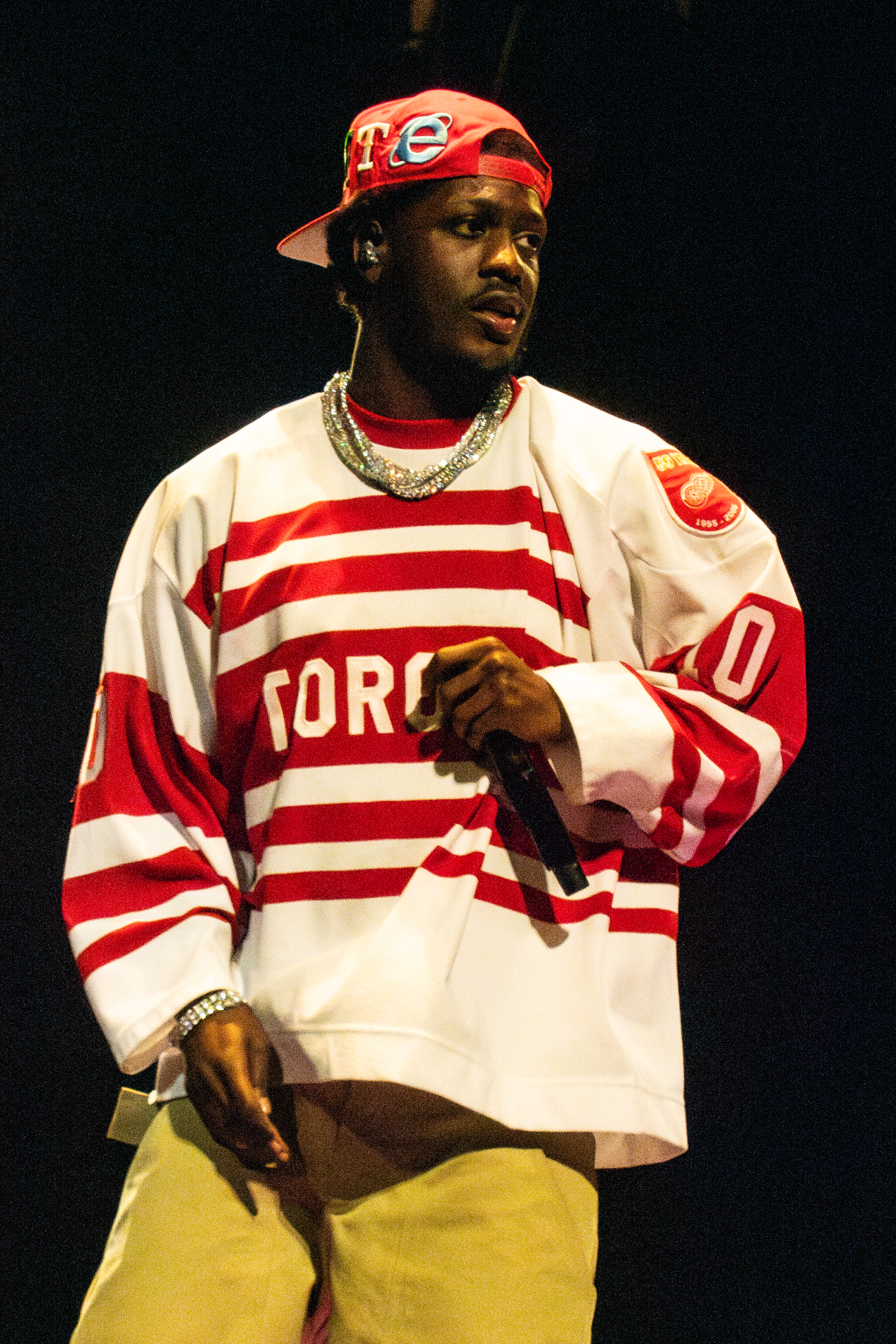
Lil Yachty

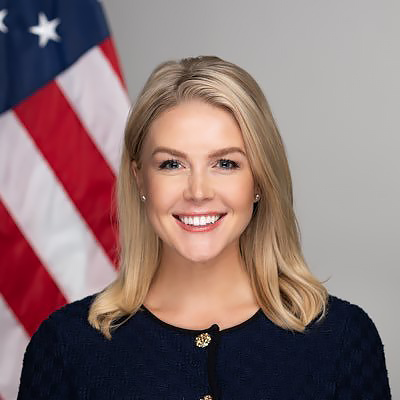
Karoline Leavitt

- August 2
  - Austin Theory, wrestler, bodybuilder, and actor
  - Christina Robinson, actress
- August 5
  - Adam Irigoyen, actor
  - Olivia Holt, actress
- August 8
  - Corpse Husband, internet personality
  - Antonee Robinson, soccer player
- August 10 – Kylie Jenner, model
- August 11 – Emily Chan, Olympic ice skater
- August 12 – Jordan Brown, person exonerated of murder
- August 16 – Greyson Chance, singer
- August 17 – Vory, musician
- August 19 – Joseph Castanon, actor and singer
- August 22 – Fanum, streamer
- August 23 – Lil Yachty, rapper
- August 24 – Karoline Leavitt, press secretary
- August 25 – Madison Desch, artistic gymnast
- August 26 – Cordae, rapper

=== September ===
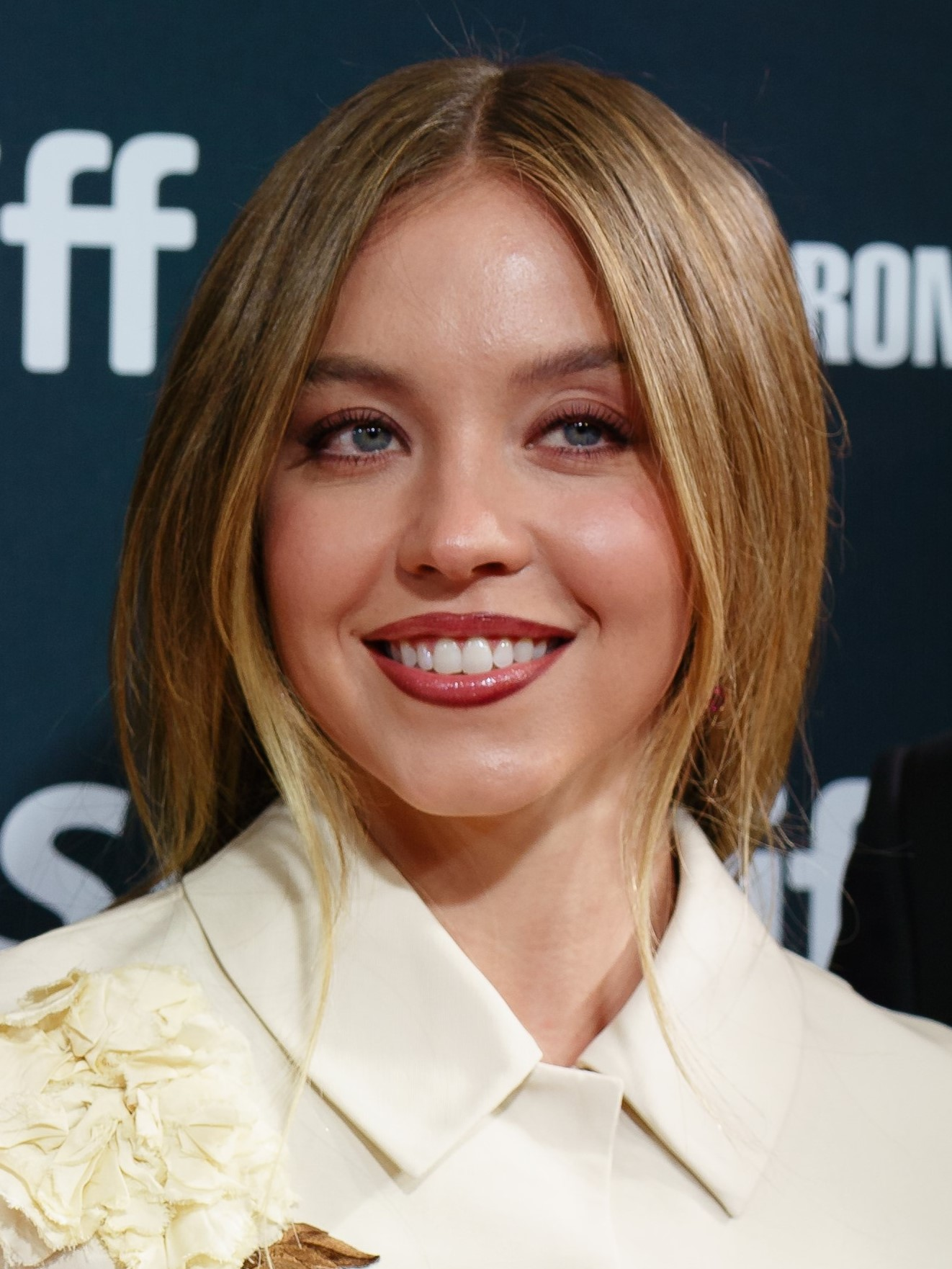
Sydney Sweeney

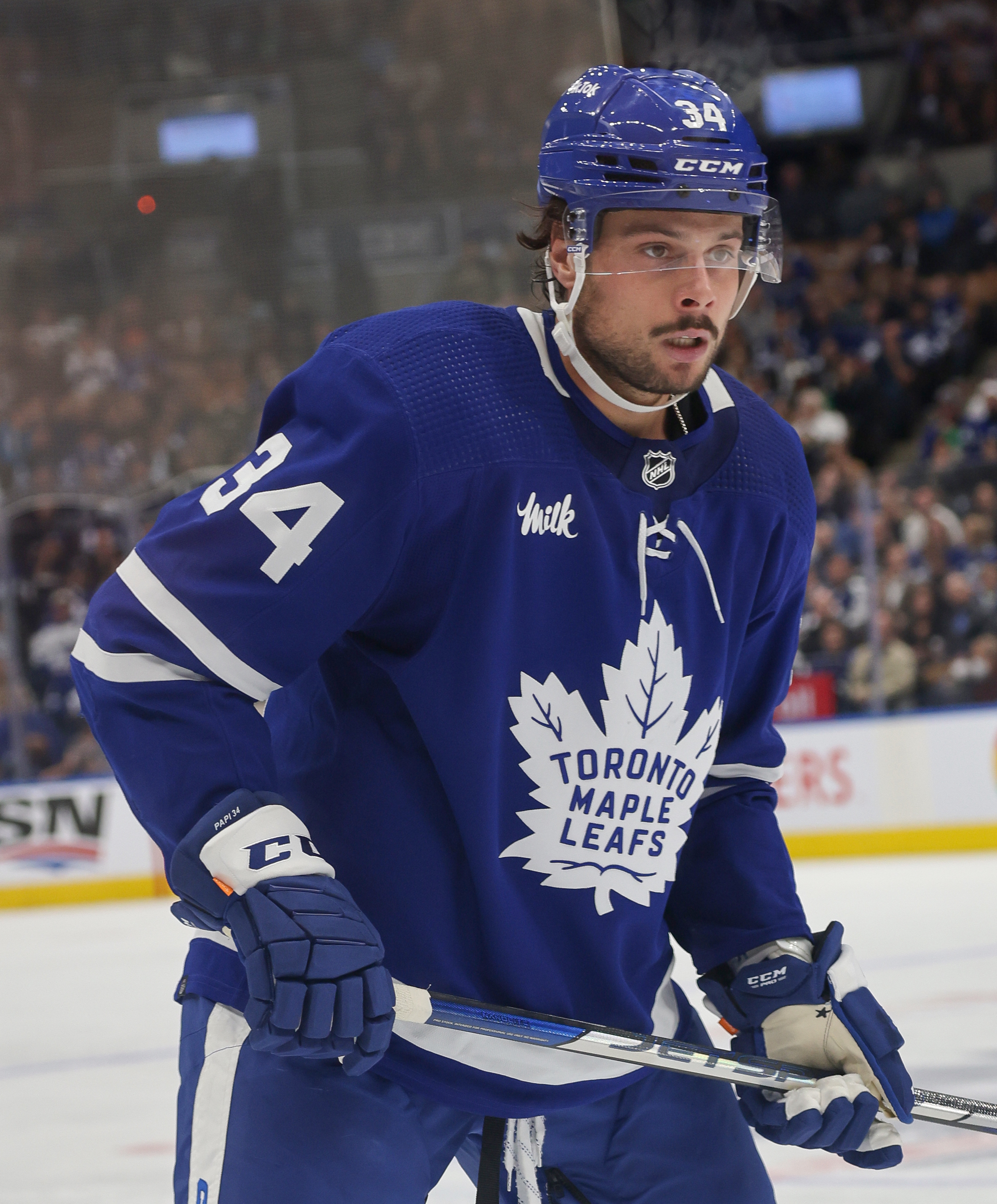
Auston Matthews

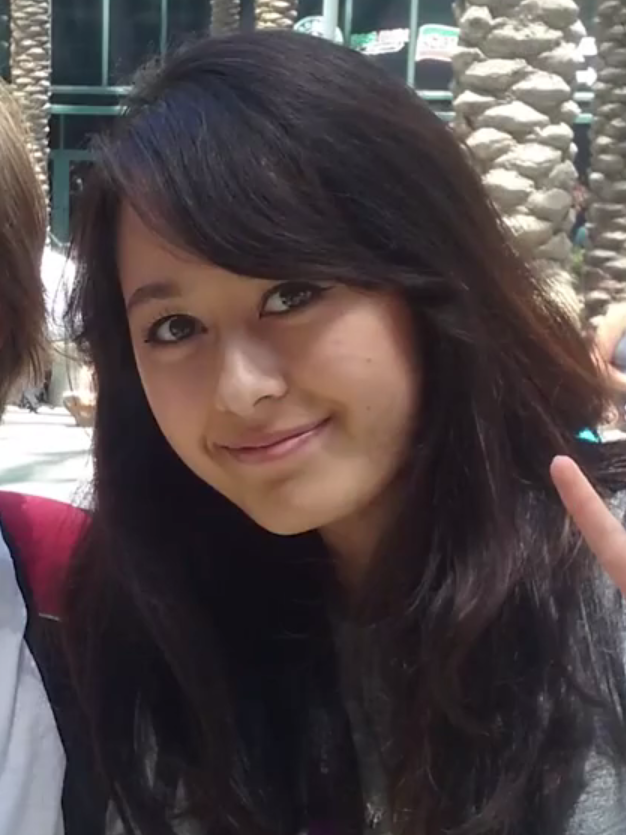
Jaiden Animations

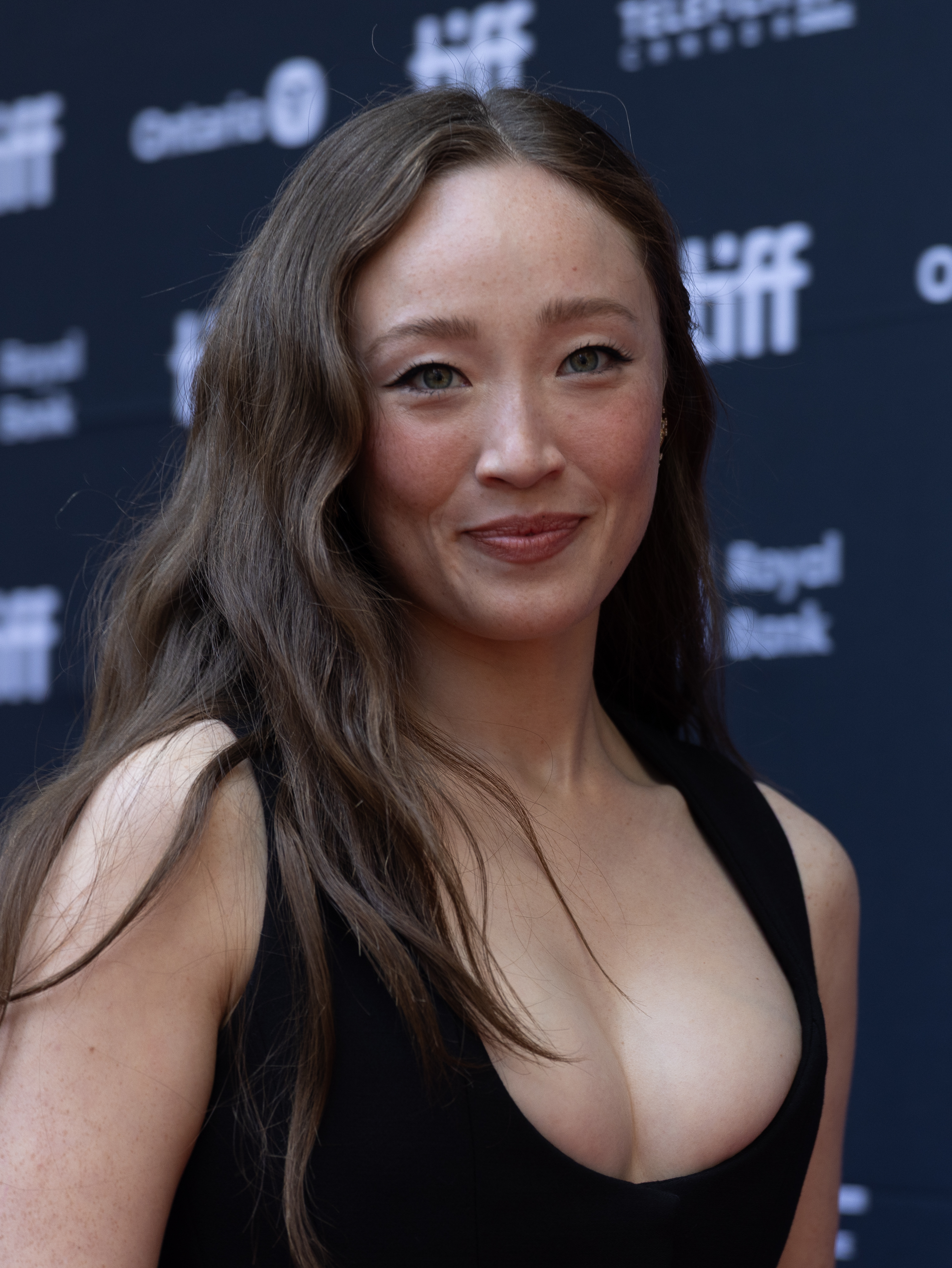
Havana Rose Liu

- September 2 – 645AR, rapper
- September 3 – Shavar McIntosh, actor
- September 10 – Leah Keiser, figure skater
- September 11
  - Julia Marino, Olympic snowboarder
  - Michelle Randolph, actress
- September 12
  - Julia Kern, Olympic cross-country skier
  - Sydney Sweeney, actress
- September 16 – Elena Kampouris, actress
- September 17 – Auston Matthews, ice hockey player
- September 24
  - Kaysha Love, Olympic bobsledder
  - Malaya Watson, singer
- September 25 – Laquan McDonald, murder victim (d. 2014)
- September 27 – Jaiden Animations, animator
- September 28 – Lauren Jortberg, Olympic cross-country skier
- September 30 – Havana Rose Liu, actress and model

=== October ===
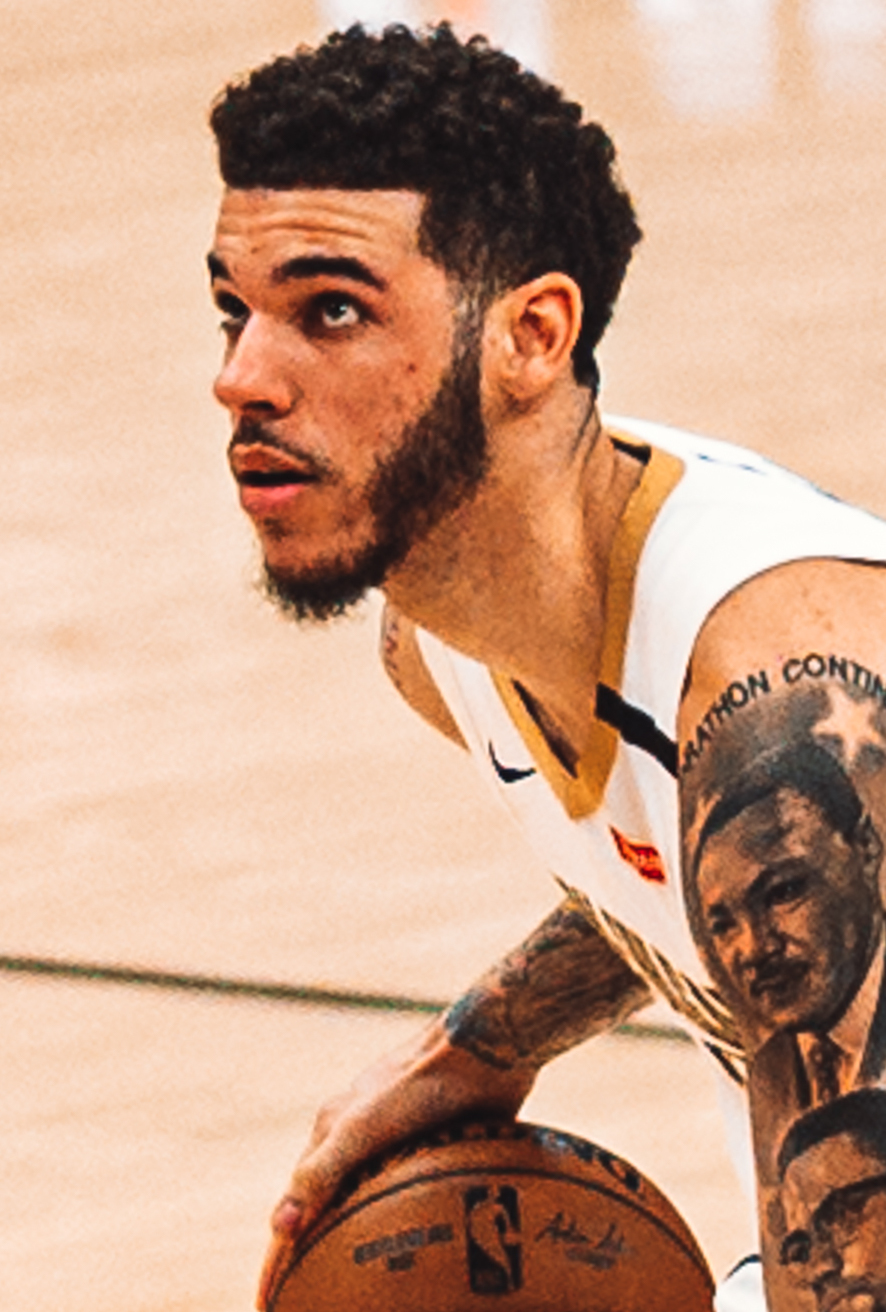
Lonzo Ball

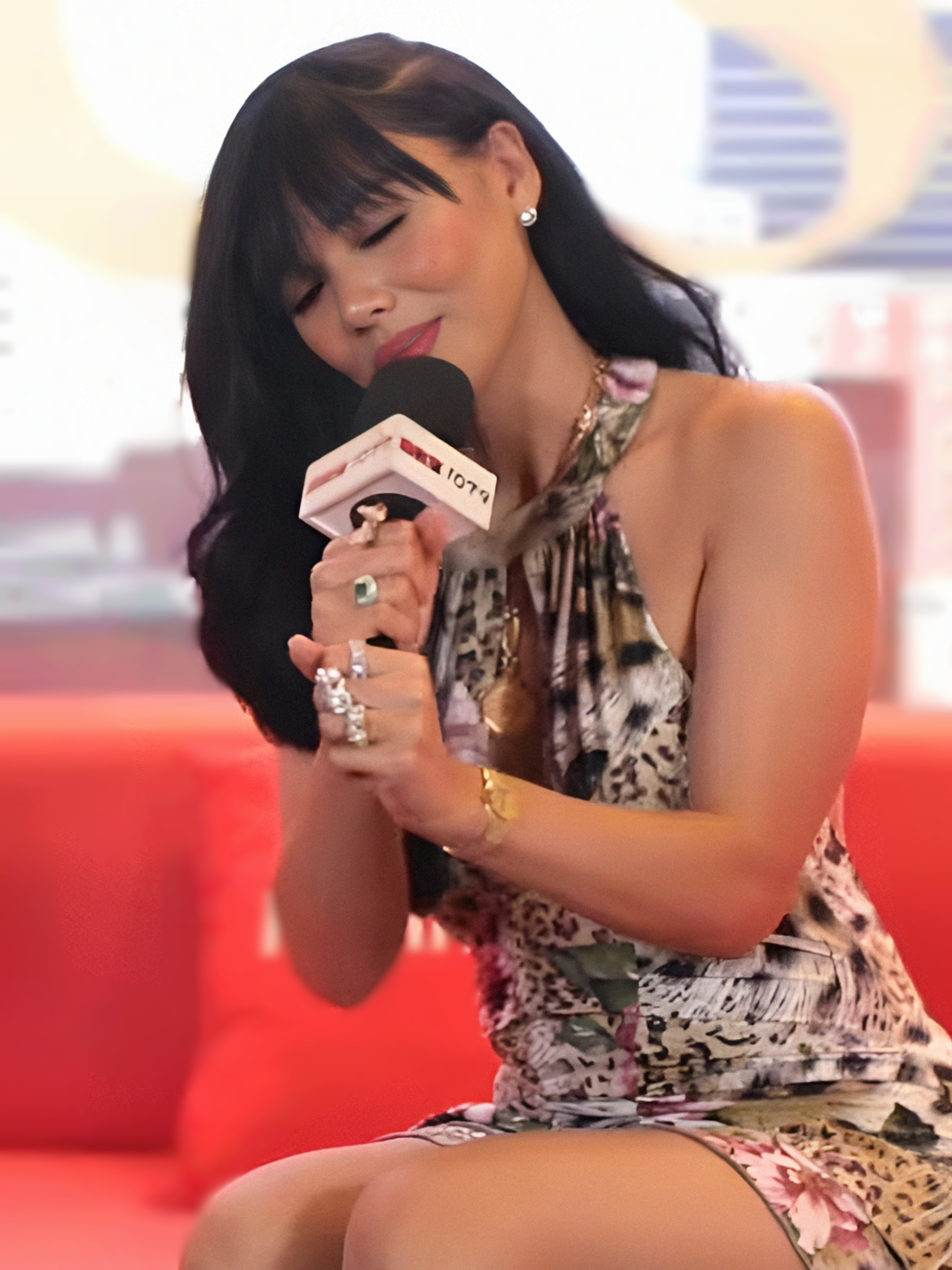
Mariah the Scientist

- October 2 – Rubi Rose, rapper and model
- October 3
  - Jonathan Isaac, basketball player
  - Colby Stevenson, Olympic freestyle skier
- October 4
  - Matt Deitsch, writer and activist
  - Brenden Foster, cancer patient (d. 2008)
- October 6 – Michael J. Woodard, singer and voice actor
- October 7
  - Kira Kosarin, actress
  - Nicole Maines, actress
  - J. Rey Soul, singer
- October 8 – Bella Thorne, actress, dancer, singer, and model
- October 9 – Ben Richardson, Olympic curler
- October 10
  - DDG, rapper
  - Grace Rolek, actress and singer
- October 13
- October 15 – Adora Svitak, prodigy and author
- October 23
  - Nick Bosa, football player
  - Zach Callison, actor
- October 24
  - Arthur Gunn, singer
  - Bron Breakker, wrestler and football player
- October 25 – Tyler Alvarez, actor
- October 27
  - Lonzo Ball, basketball player
  - Mariah the Scientist, musician
- October 28
  - Taylor Fritz, tennis player
  - Sierra McCormick, actress
- October 30 – Tage Thompson, ice hockey player
- October 31 – Sydney Park, actress

=== November ===
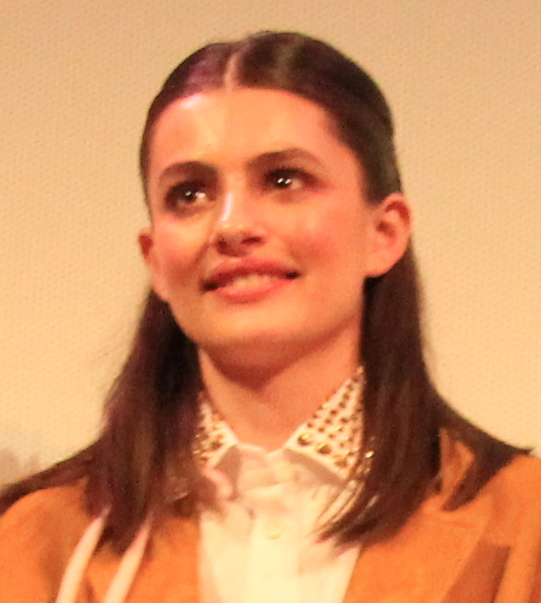
Diana Silvers

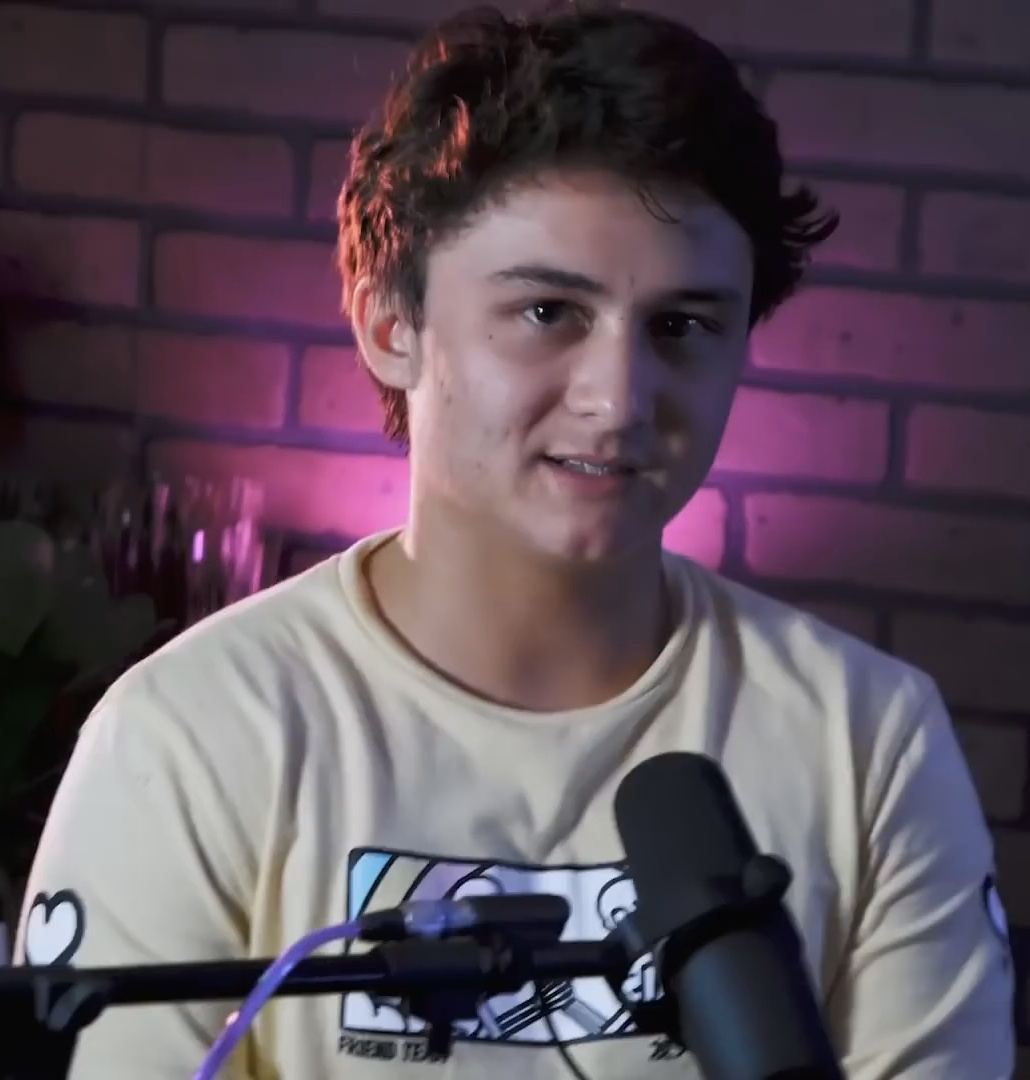
Michael Reeves

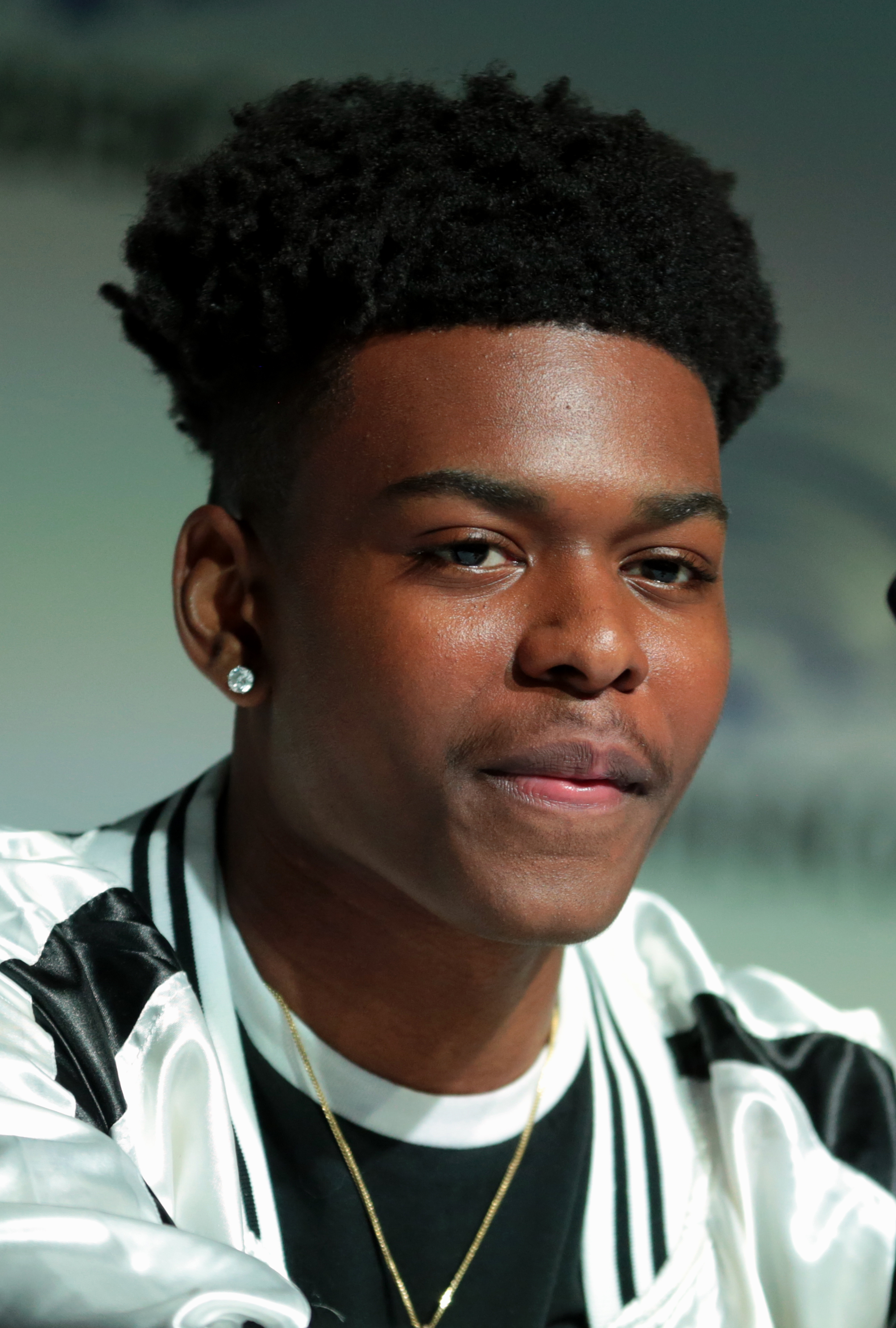
Aubrey Joseph

- November 1
  - Max Burkholder, actor
  - Alex Wolff, actor and musician
- November 3 – Diana Silvers, actress
- November 6
  - Riley Pint, baseball player
  - Jamal Roberts, singer
- November 9 – Alex Kirilloff, baseball player
- November 10 – Margie Freed, Olympic biathlete
- November 12
  - Josh Hokit, mixed martial artist
  - Dexter Lawrence, football player
- November 13 – Brent and Shane Kinsman, twin actors
- November 15 – Leelah Alcorn, transgender girl whose suicide attracted international attention (d. 2014)
- November 17 – Zach Bonner, philanthropist and founder of the non-profit charity Little Red Wagon Foundation
- November 19
  - Zach Collins, basketball player
  - The McCaughey septuplets, world's first known septuplets
  - Rachel Parsons, ice dancer
- November 20 – Michael Reeves, internet personality
- November 26 – Aubrey Joseph, actor
- November 29
  - William Byron, racing driver
  - Nina O'Brien, Olympic Alpine ski racer
- November 30 – Elijah Holyfield, wrestler and former professional football

=== December ===
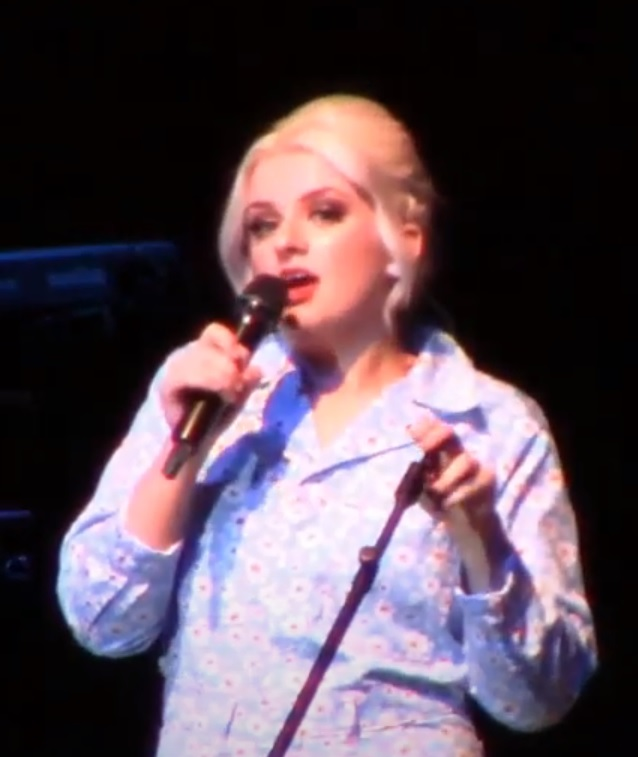
Maddie Poppe

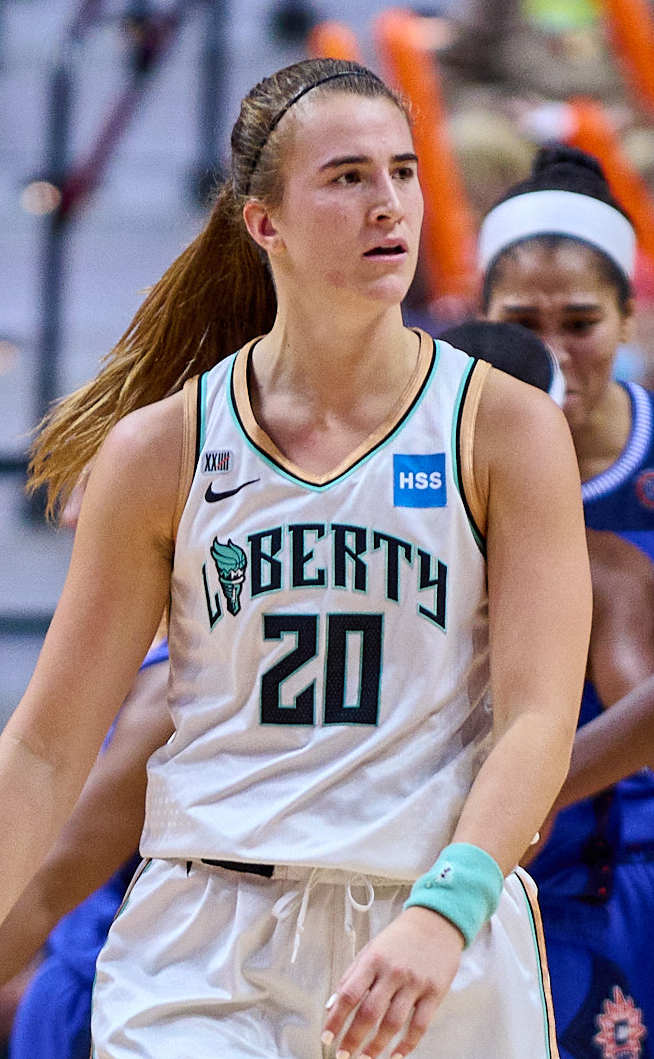
Sabrina Ionescu

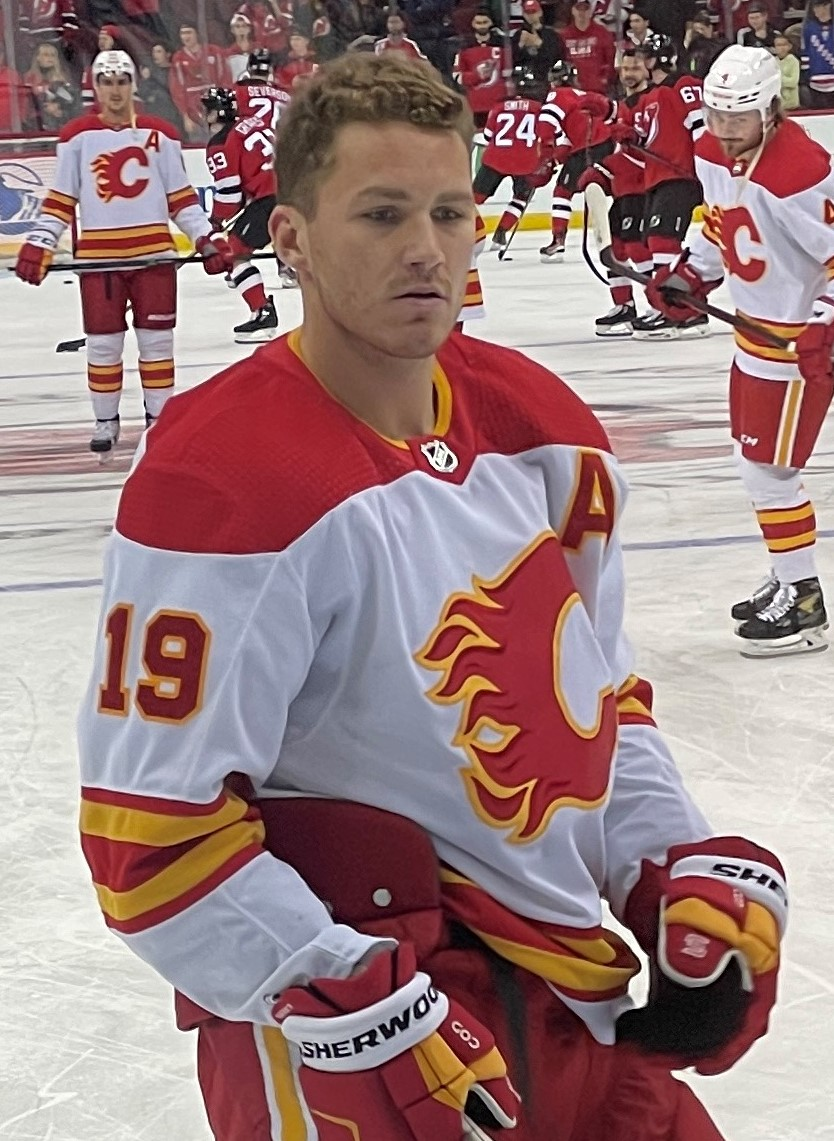
Matthew Tkachuk

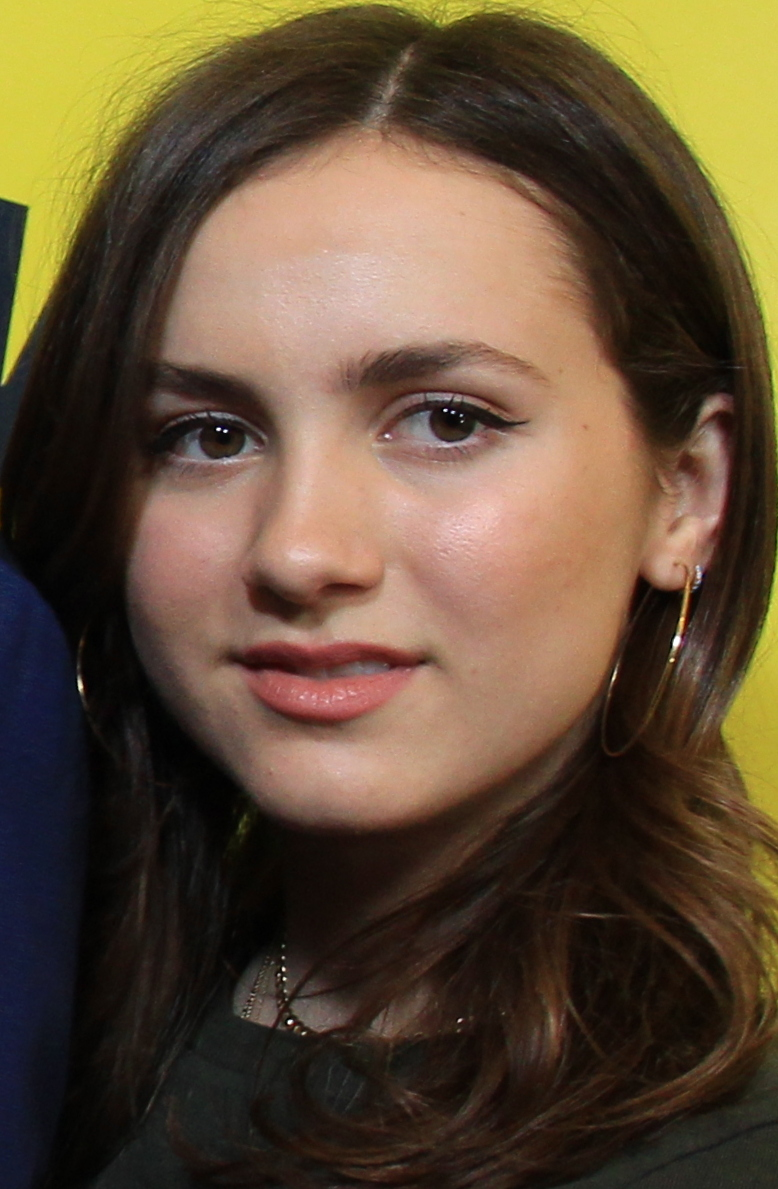
Maude Apatow

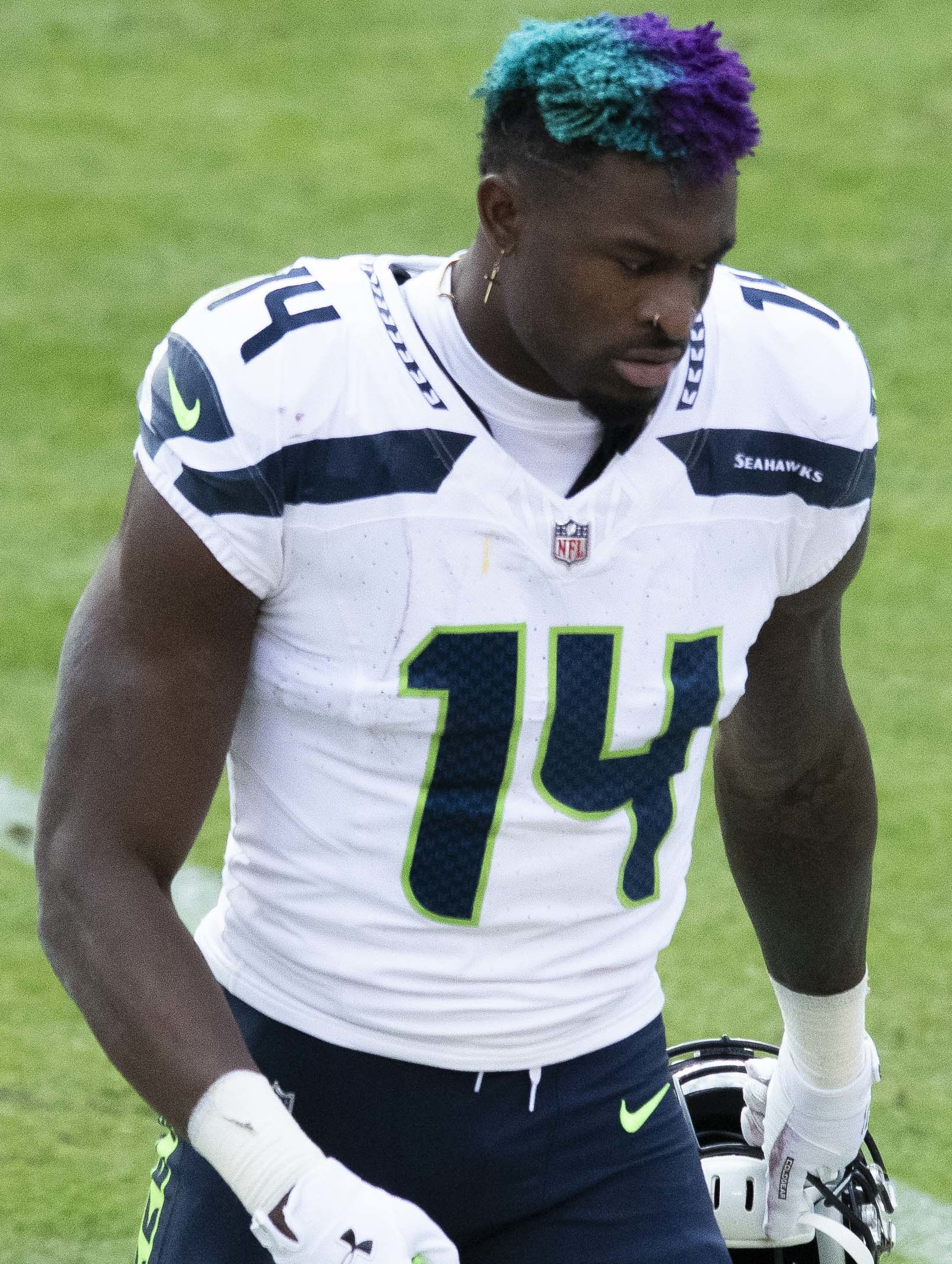
DK Metcalf

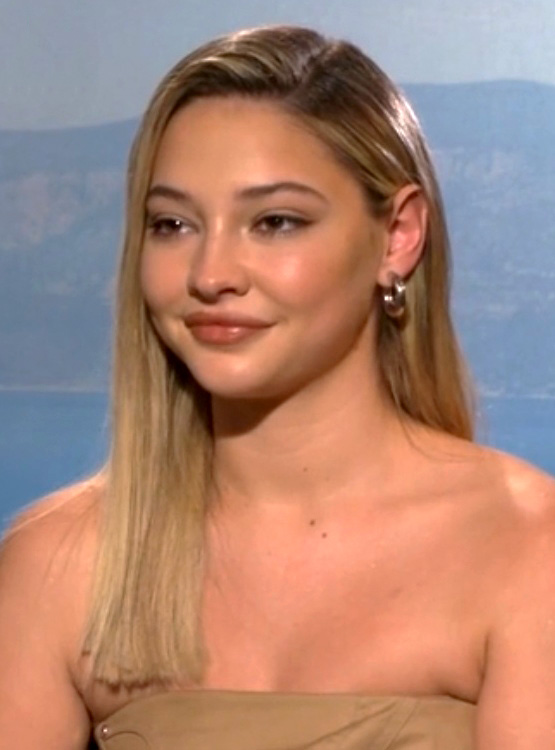
Madelyn Cline

- December 3 – Rashan Gary, football player
- December 5 – Maddie Poppe, singer
- December 6 – Sabrina Ionescu, basketball player
- December 11
  - Ben Cook, actor
  - Matthew Tkachuk, hockey player
- December 12
  - Christian Saulsberry, football player (d. 2022)
  - Jacob Wohl, far-right conspiracy theorist, fraudster, and internet troll
- December 14 – DK Metcalf, football player
- December 15
  - Stefania LaVie Owen, actress
  - Maude Apatow, actress
- December 16 – Supriya Ganesh, actor
- December 20 – De'Aaron Fox, basketball player
- December 21
  - Madelyn Cline, actress
  - Charlie McAvoy, ice hockey player
- December 28 – Nash Grier, internet personality
- December 31 – Cameron Carter-Vickers, soccer player

=== Full date unknown ===
- Milivi Adams (d. 2002)
- Amanda Balon, actress, vocalist and dancer
- Melat Kiros, lawyer and politician
- Lexi Peters, first female ice hockey player to appear in an EA Sports NHL Hockey video game

== Deaths ==
=== January ===
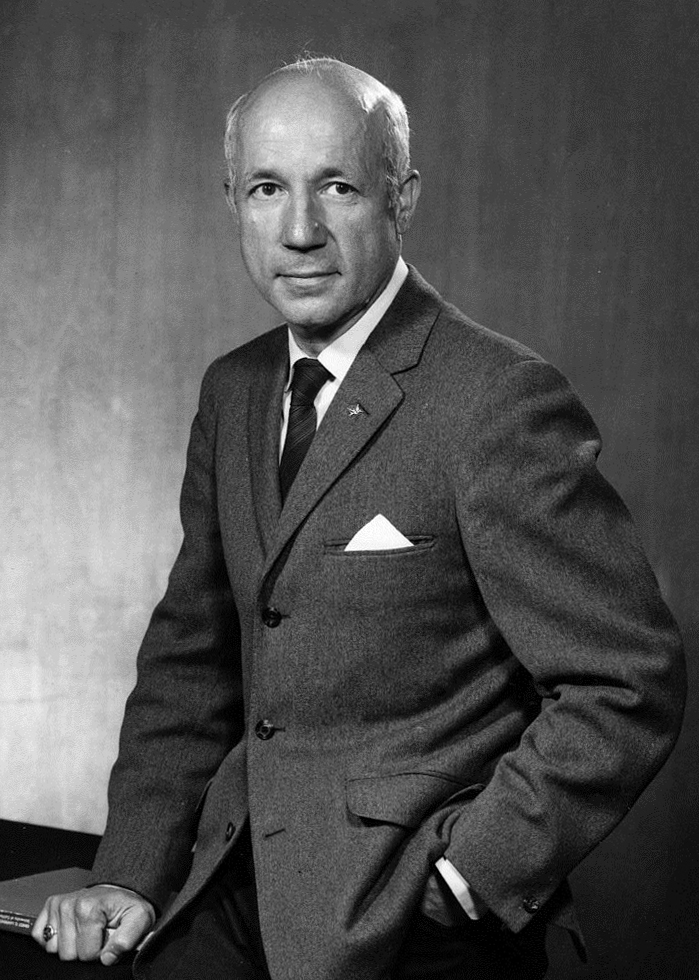
Melvin Calvin

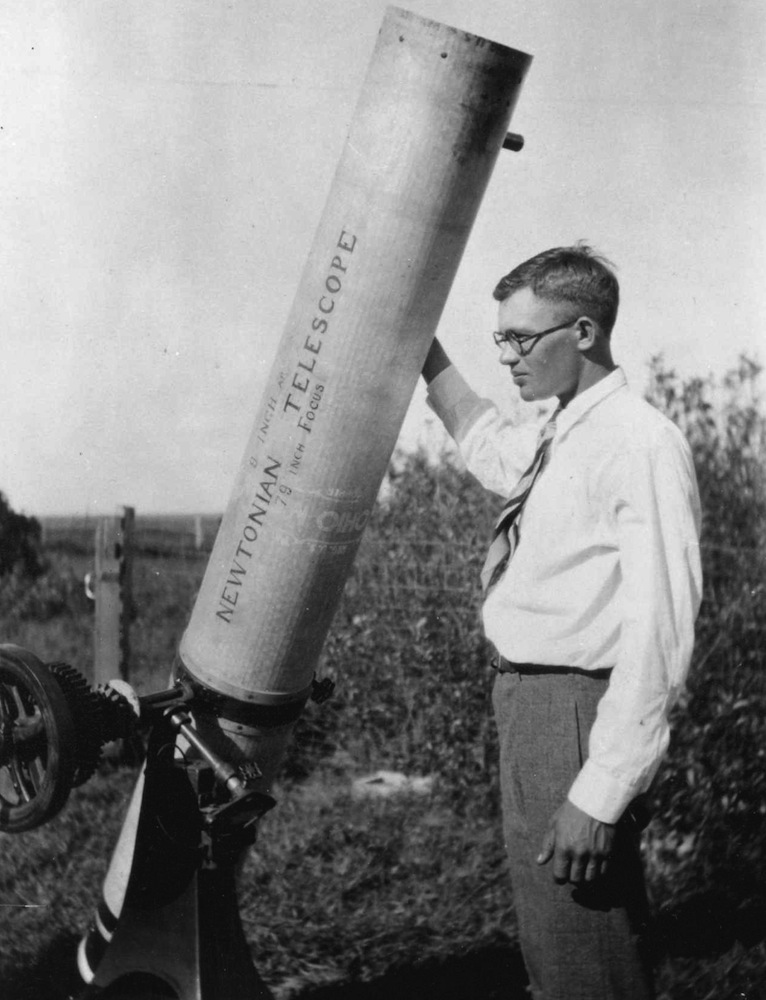
Clyde Tombaugh

- January 1 – Townes Van Zandt, American country-folk music singer-songwriter (b. 1944)
- January 4 – Harry Helmsley, American real estate mogul (b. 1909)
- January 5 – Burton Lane, American composer and lyricist (b. 1912)
- January 6 – Catherine Scorsese, American actress (b. 1912)
- January 8 – Melvin Calvin, American chemist (b. 1911)
- January 9
  - Jesse White, American actor (b. 1917)
  - Ellen Griffin Dunne, American actress and activist (b. 1932)
- January 11
  - Carol Habben, American baseball player (b. 1933)
  - Sheldon Leonard, American actor, director, and producer (b. 1907)
- January 12 – Charles Brenton Huggins, Canadian-born cancer researcher (b. 1901)
- January 16 – Ennis Cosby, murder victim, son of Bill Cosby (b. 1969)
- January 17 – Clyde Tombaugh, American astronomer (b. 1906)
- January 18 – Paul Tsongas, American politician (b. 1941)
- January 19
  - James Dickey, American poet and novelist (b. 1923)
  - Adriana Caselotti, American actress (b. 1916)
- January 20 – Curt Flood, American baseball player and sportscaster (b. 1938)
- January 21 – Colonel Tom Parker, Dutch musical entrepreneur and manager for Elvis Presley (b. 1909)
- January 23
  - Richard Berry, American singer and composer (b. 1935)
  - Bill Zuckert, American actor (b. 1915)
- January 24 – Dr. Jerry Graham, American wrestler and trainer (b. 1921)
- January 25 – Jeane Dixon, American astrologer (b. 1904)
- January 26
  - Guy Raymond, American actor (b. 1911)
  - Laurence Stoddard, American rower (b. 1903)
- January 30 – Charles Hargens, American painter. (b. 1893)
- January 31 – Johnny Klein, American drummer (b. 1918)

=== February ===
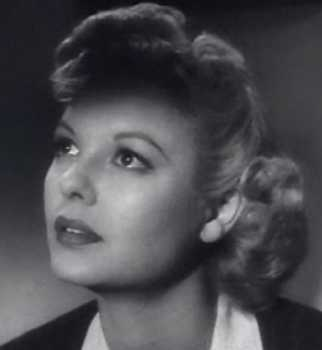
Marjorie Reynolds

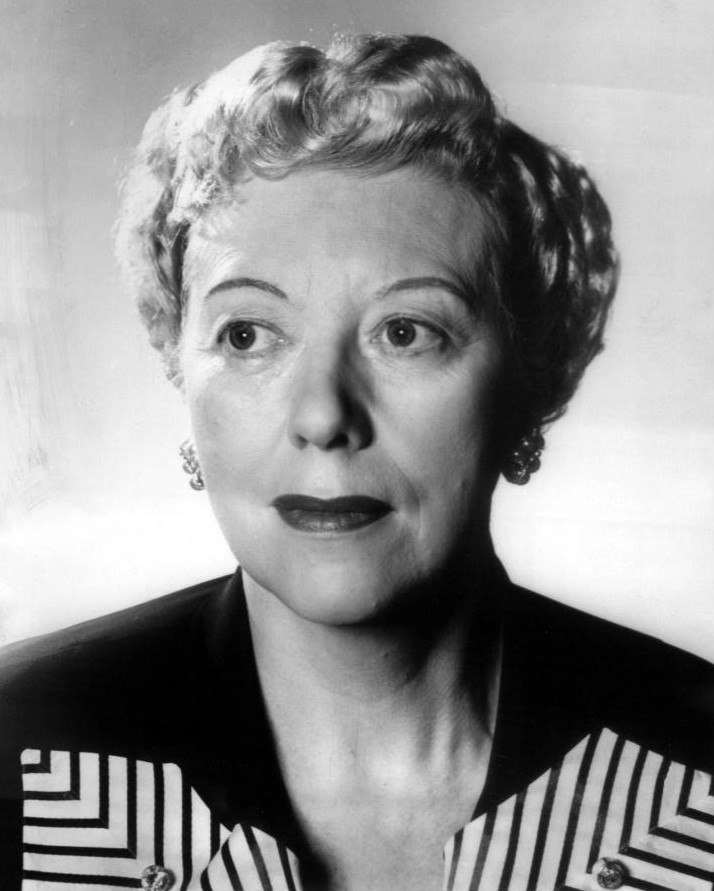
Ethel Owen

- February 1
  - Herb Caen, American newspaper columnist (b. 1916)
  - Marjorie Reynolds, American actress (b. 1917)
- February 5 – Pamela Harriman, American diplomat (b. 1920)
- February 7 – Owen Aspinall, 45th Governor of American Samoa (b. 1927)
- February 8 – Corey Scott, American motorcycle stunt rider (b. 1968)
- February 11 – Don Porter, American actor (b. 1912)
- February 13 – John R. Bartels, American judge (b. 1897)
- February 16 – Ethel Owen, American actress (b. 1893)
- February 22 – Joey Aiuppa, American mobster (b. 1907)
- February 23 – Tony Williams, American jazz drummer (b. 1945)
- February 24 – Isabelle Lucas, Canadian-born British actress (b. 1927)
- February 26 – David Doyle, American actor (b. 1929)

=== March ===
- March 2 – Judi Bari, American environmental activist (b. 1949)
- March 4
  - Robert H. Dicke, American experimental physicist (b. 1916)
  - Carey Loftin, American actor and stuntman (b. 1914)
- March 7 – Edward Mills Purcell, American physicist (b. 1912)
- March 9 – The Notorious B.I.G., American rapper (b. 1972)
- March 10 – LaVern Baker, American singer (b. 1929)
- March 15 – Gail Davis, American actress (b. 1925)″
- March 17 – Jermaine Stewart, American singer (b. 1957)
- March 20 – Tony Zale, American boxer (b. 1913)
- March 21 – John Nemechek, American race car driver (b. 1970)

=== April ===
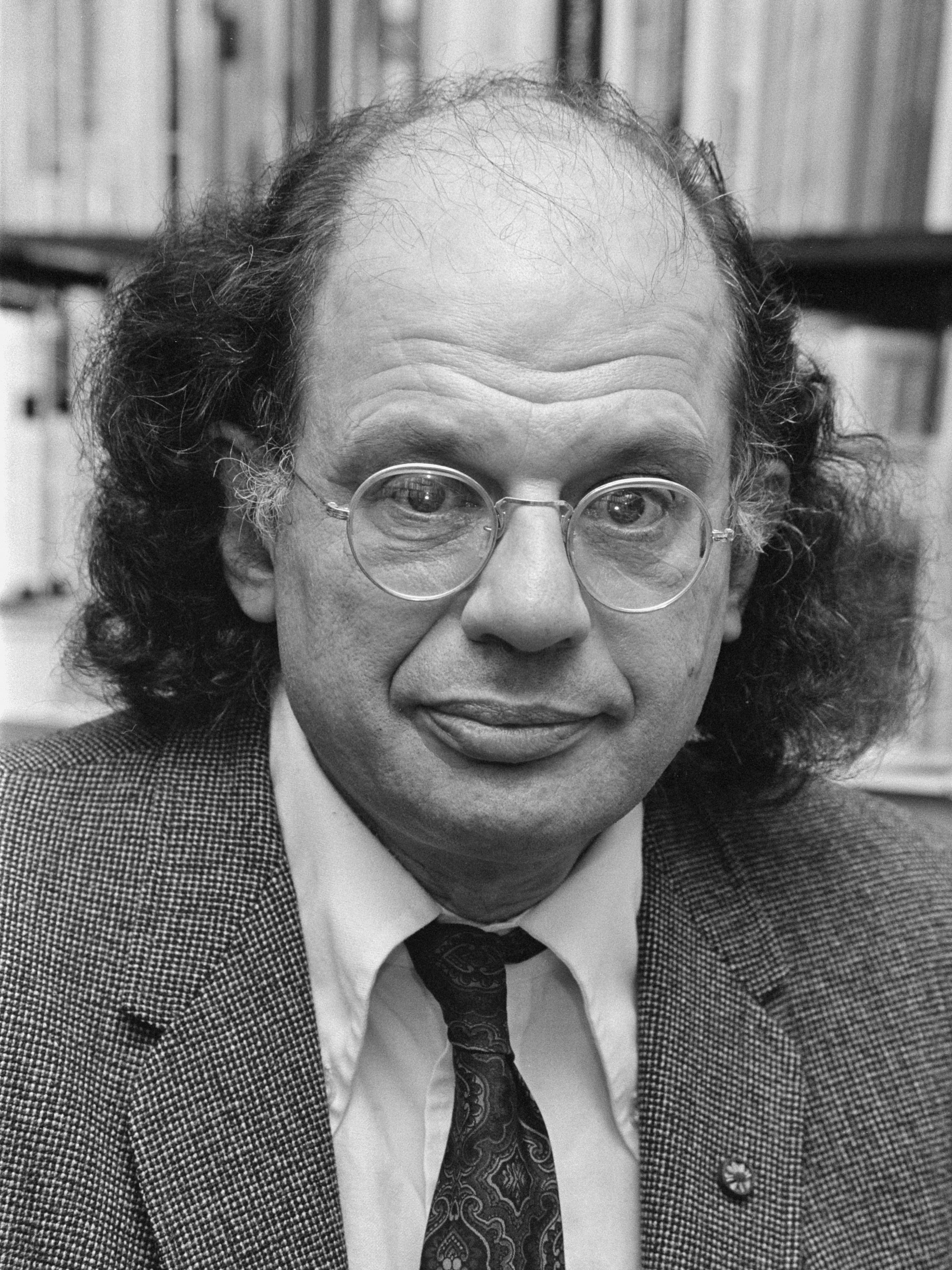
Allen Ginsberg

- April 5 – Allen Ginsberg, American poet (b. 1926)
- April 8 – Laura Nyro, American singer and composer (b. 1947)
- April 9 – Helene Hanff, American writer (b. 1916)
- April 10 – Michael Dorris, American author (b. 1945)
- April 12 – George Wald, American scientist (b. 1906)
- April 13 – Dorothy Frooks, American author, military figure and actress. (b. 1896)
- April 15
  - Don Bexley, American actor and comedian (b. 1910)
  - Mildred Cleghorn, Chiricahua chairwoman of the Fort Sill Apache tribe (b. 1910)
- April 16 – Doris Angleton, American socialite (b. 1951)
- April 17 – Mary French Rockefeller, American heiress, socialite and philanthropist (b. 1910)
- April 18 – Georgia Schmidt, American actress (b. 1904)
- April 20
  - Jean Louis, American costume designer (b. 1907)
  - Henry Mucci, American army ranger (b. 1909)
- April 21 – Thomas H. D. Mahoney, American professor and politician (b. 1913)
- April 25 – Pat Paulsen, American comedian (b. 1927)
- April 26 – John Beal, American actor (b. 1909)
- April 27 – Jeffrey Trail, American naval officer (b. 1969)
- April 30 – Henry Picard, American golfer (b. 1906)

=== May ===
- May 2 – David Madson, American architect and gay rights activist (b. 1963)
- May 4
  - Alvy Moore, American actor (b. 1921)
  - Lee Miglin, American businessman and philanthropist (b. 1924)
- May 8 – Robert H. Krieble, American chemist (b. 1916)
- May 11 – Howard Morton, American actor (b. 1925)
- May 14
  - Harry Blackstone Jr., American magician (b. 1934)
  - Thelma Carpenter, American singer and actress (b. 1922)
- May 18 – Bridgette Andersen, American actress (b. 1975)
- May 22 – Alfred Hershey, American biochemist (b. 1908)
- May 23 – James Lee Byars, American artist (b. 1932)
- May 29
  - Jeff Buckley, American musician (b. 1966)
  - George Fenneman, American radio and television announcer (b. 1919)
- May 31 – James Bennett Griffin, American archaeologist (b. 1905)

=== June ===
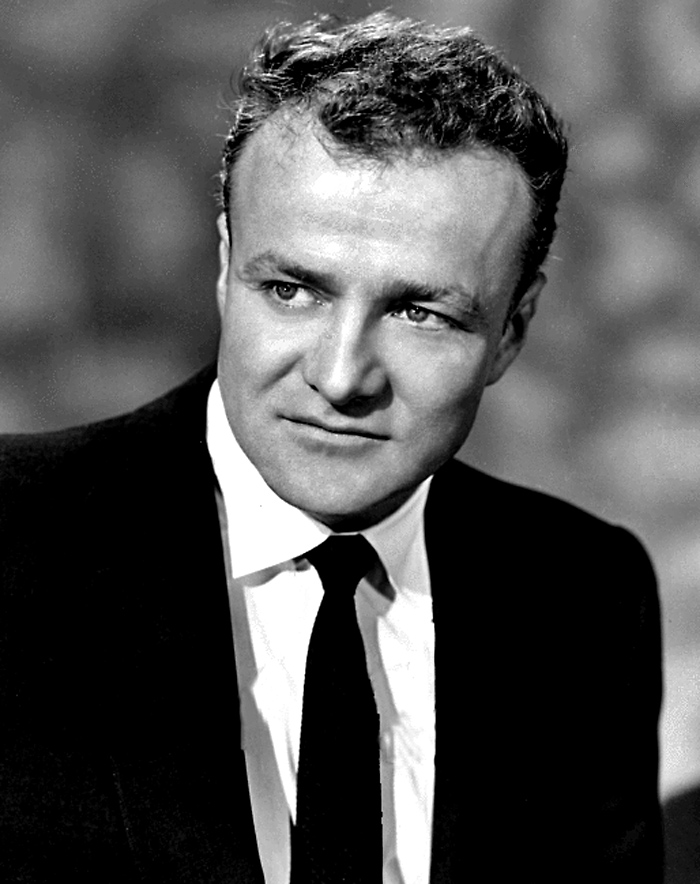
Brian Keith

- June 2 – Helen Jacobs, American tennis champion (b. 1908)
- June 3 – Dennis James, American game show host (b. 1917)
- June 4 – Ronnie Lane, English rock musician (b. 1946)
- June 6 – Magda Gabor, American actress (b. 1915)
- June 8 – Reid Shelton, American actor (b. 1924)
- June 14 – Richard Jaeckel, American actor (b. 1926)
- June 23
  - Betty Shabazz, American educator and activist (b. 1936)
  - William Slater Brown, American novelist, biographer and translator (b. 1896)
- June 24
  - Don Hutson, American football player (b. 1913)
  - Brian Keith, American actor (b. 1921)
- June 26 – Israel Kamakawiwoʻole, Hawaiian singer (b. 1959)
- June 29 – William Hickey, American actor (b. 1927)

=== July ===
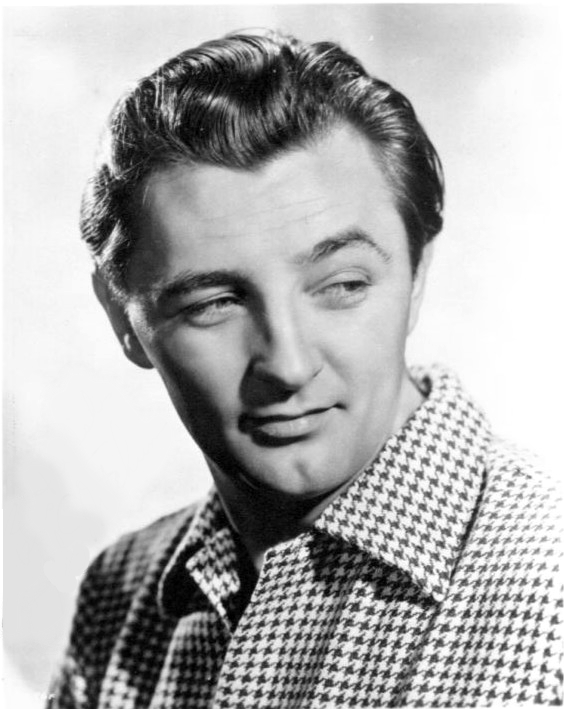
Robert Mitchum

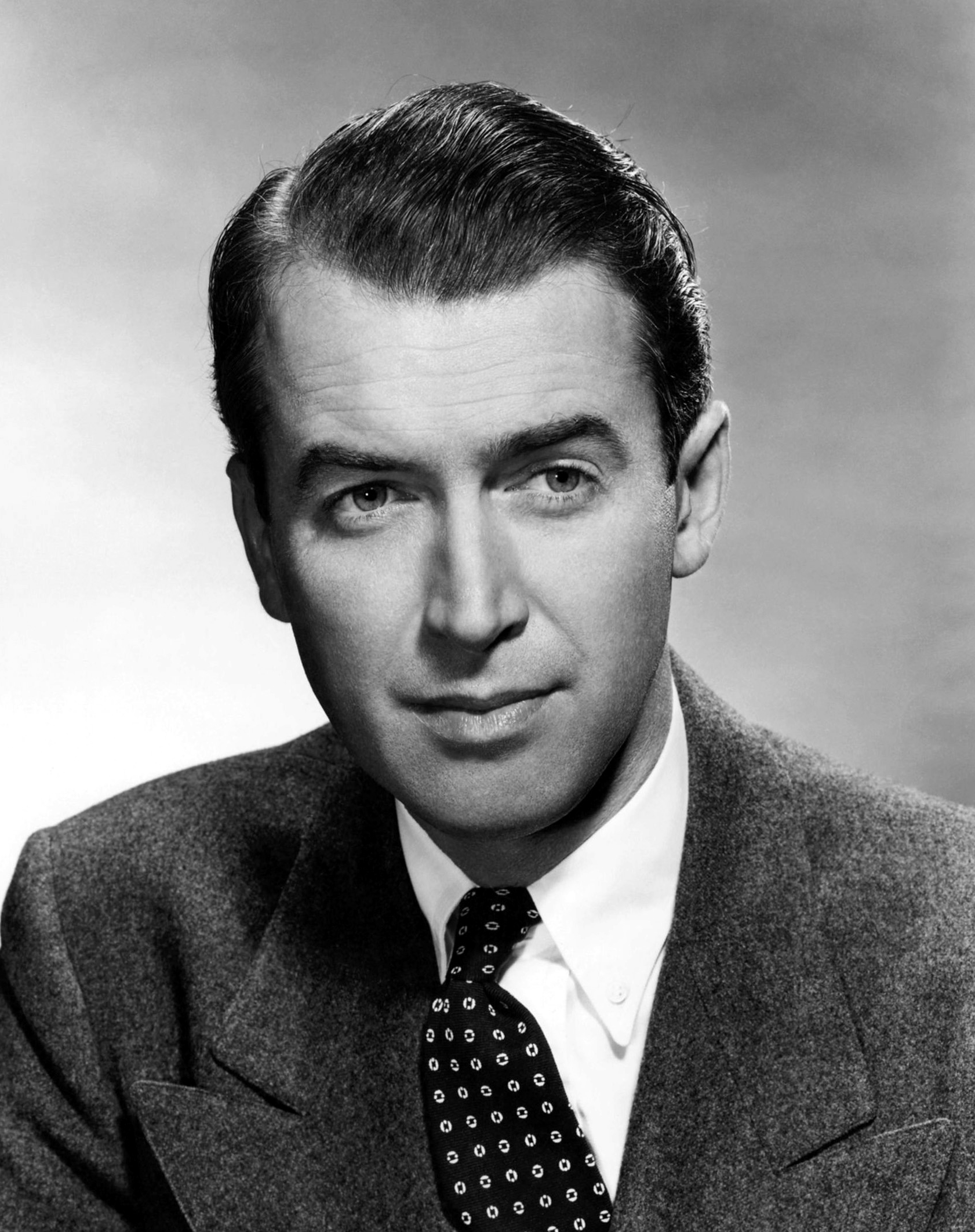
James Stewart

- July 1
  - Robert Mitchum, American actor (b. 1917)
  - Charles Werner, American cartoonist (b. 1909)
- July 2 – James Stewart, American actor and soldier (b. 1908)
- July 4 – Charles Kuralt, American reporter and television journalist (b. 1934)
- July 5 – Mrs. Miller, American singer (b. 1907)
- July 13 – Alexandra Danilova, Russian-American ballerina and dance instructor (b. 1903)
- July 15 – Gianni Versace, Italian fashion designer (b. 1946)
- July 18 – Eugene Merle Shoemaker, American astronomer (b. 1928)
- July 23 – Andrew Cunanan, American serial killer (b. 1969)
- July 24
  - William J. Brennan Jr., American Supreme Court Justice (b. 1906)
  - Frank Parker, American tennis champion (b. 1916)
- July 25 – Ben Hogan, American golf champion (b. 1912)
- July 27 – K'tut Tantri, American broadcaster and hotelier (b. 1899)

=== August ===
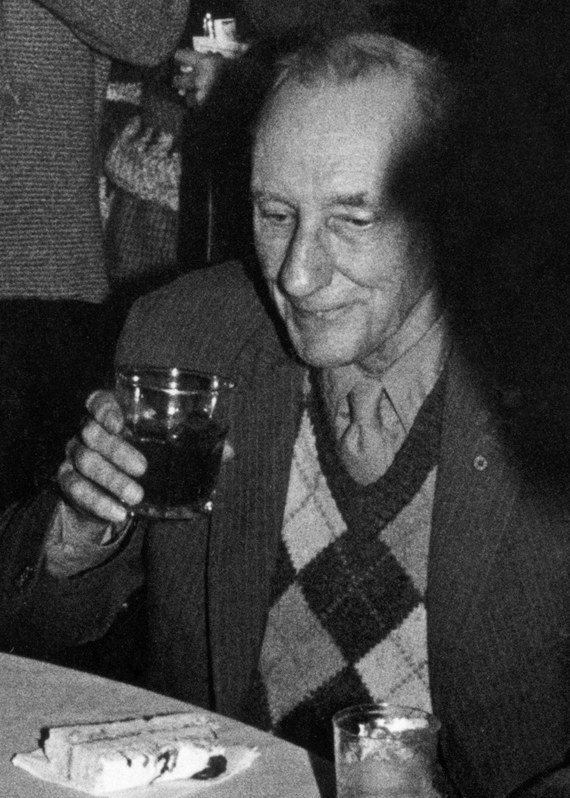
William S. Burroughs

- August 2 – William S. Burroughs, American writer and artist (b. 1914)
- August 10 – Conlon Nancarrow, American-born Mexican composer (b. 1912)
- August 11 – Clara Peller, American TV personality (b. 1902)
- August 12 – Luther Allison, American musician (b. 1939)
- August 18
  - Harry R. Wellman, American university president (b. 1899)
  - Jimmy Witherspoon, American musician (b. 1920)
- August 23 – Lucy Somerville Howorth, lawyer, feminist and politician (b. 1895)
- August 25 – Carl Richard Jacobi, American journalist and author (b. 1908)
- August 27
  - Sally Blane, American actress (b. 1910)
  - Brandon Tartikoff, American television executive (b. 1949)

=== September ===
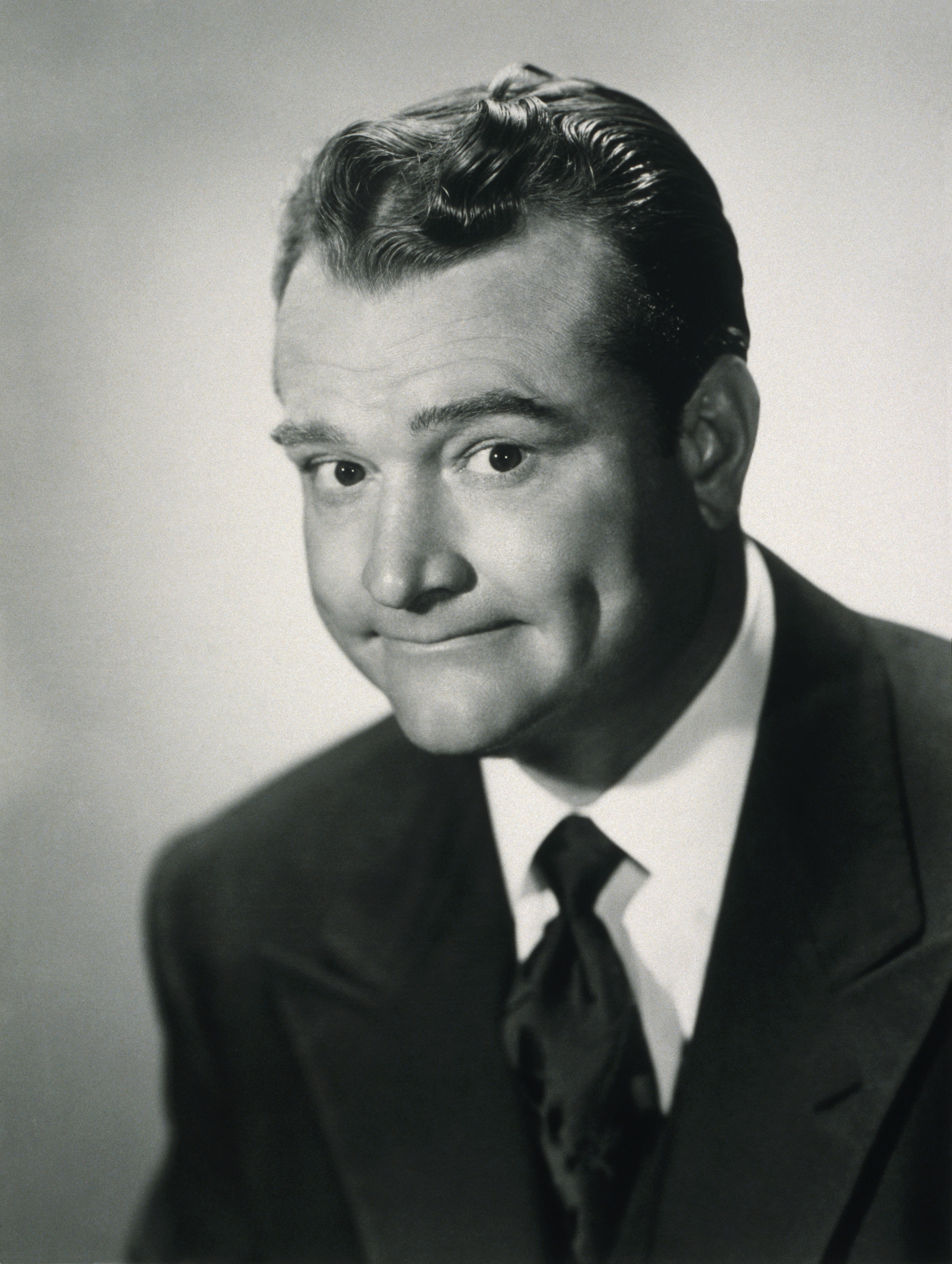
Red Skelton

- September 1 – Gordon Blake, U.S. Air Force lieutenant general (b. 1910)
- September 2 – Rudolf Bing, Austrian-born British opera manager (b. 1902)
- September 7 – Elisabeth Brooks, Canadian actress (b. 1951)
- September 8 – Helen Shaw, American actress (b. 1897)
- September 9
  - Richie Ashburn, American baseball player and broadcaster (b. 1927)
  - Burgess Meredith, American actor (b. 1907)
- September 13 – Victor Szebehely, Hungarian-born American astronomer (b. 1921)
- September 17 – Red Skelton, American comedian (b. 1913)
- September 18 – Jimmy Witherspoon, American blues singer (b. 1920)
- September 19 – Rich Mullins, American Christian musician (b. 1955)
- September 23
  - Shirley Clarke, American filmmaker (b. 1919)
  - Wilbur R. Ingalls, Jr., American architect (b. 1923)
- September 26 – Dorothy Kingsley, American screenwriter and producer (b. 1909)
- September 27 – Adriana Marines, American murder victim (b. 1991)
  - September 29 – Roy Lichtenstein, American artist (b. 1923)

=== October ===
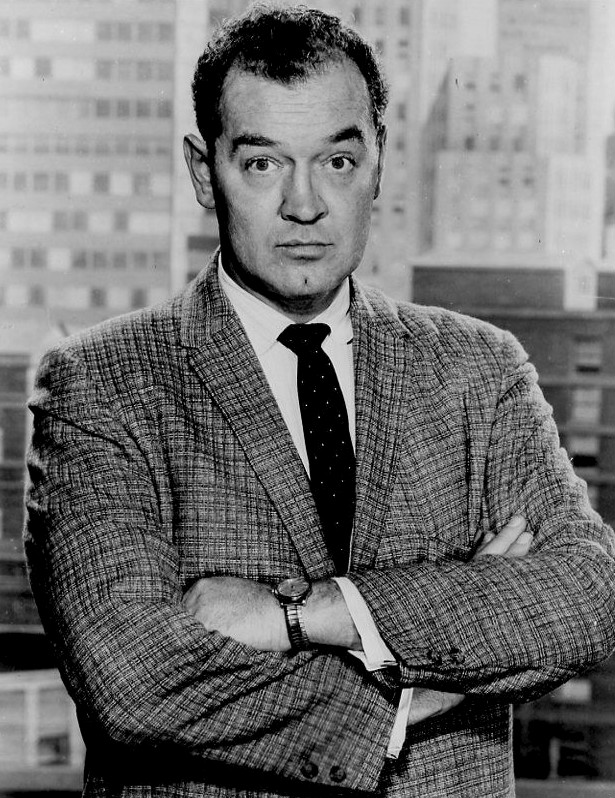
Arch Johnson

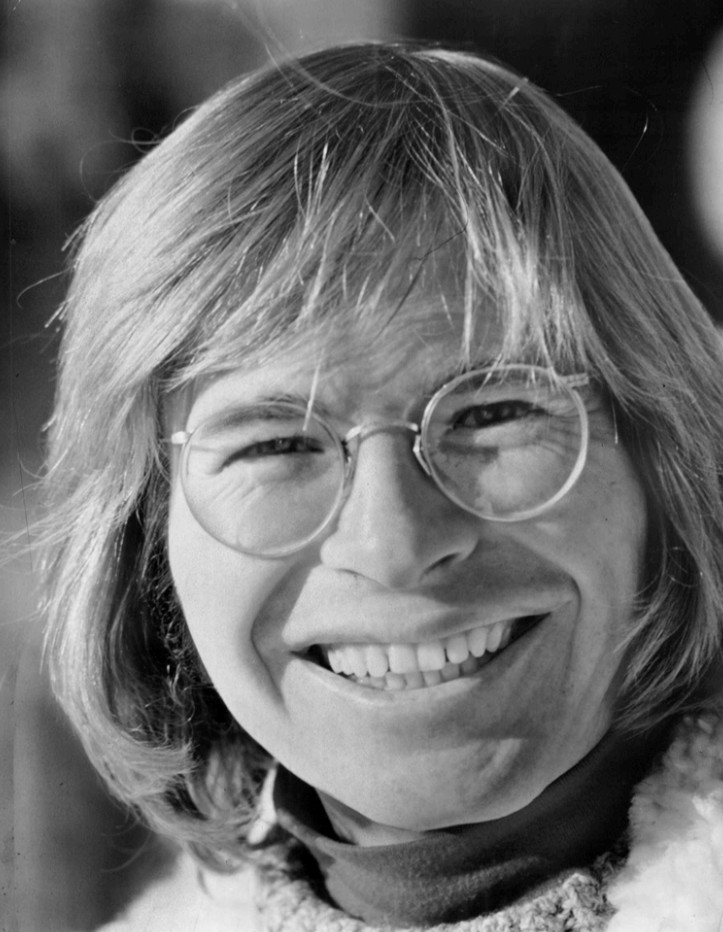
John Denver

- October 1 – Jerome H. Lemelson, American inventor (b. 1923)
- October 5
  - Brian Pillman, American professional wrestler (b. 1962)
  - Arthur Tracy, American singer (b. 1899)
- October 6 – Johnny Vander Meer, American baseball player (b. 1914)
- October 9 – Arch Johnson, American actor (b. 1922)
- October 12
  - John Denver, American musician (b. 1943)
  - Eleanor Fortson, American politician (b. 1904)
- October 14 – Harold Robbins, American writer (b. 1916)
- October 16
  - Audra Lindley, American actress (b. 1918)
  - James A. Michener, American writer (b. 1907)
- October 19 – Glen Buxton, American guitarist (b. 1947)
- October 21 – Dolph Camilli, American baseball player (b. 1907)
- October 23 – Claire Falkenstein, American sculptor and painter (b. 1908)
- October 24 – Don Messick, American voice actor (b. 1926)
- October 28 – Paul Jarrico, American screenwriter (b. 1915)
- October 29
  - Andreas Gerasimos Michalitsianos, American astrophysicist (b. 1947)
  - Anton Szandor LaVey, American author and Satanist (b. 1930)
- October 30 – Samuel Fuller, American screenwriter and director (b. 1912)
- October 31 – Sidney Darlington, American engineer (b. 1906)

=== November ===
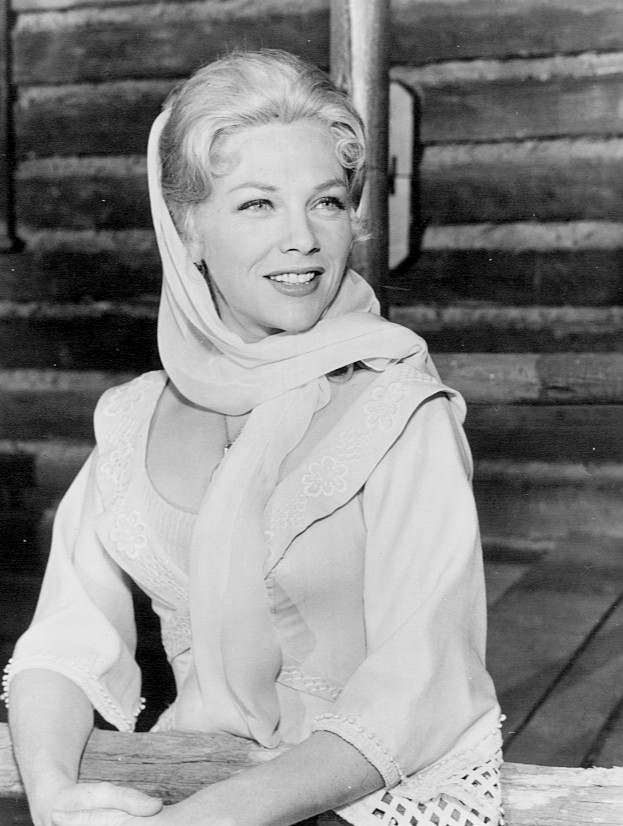
Joanna Moore

- November 1 – Victor Mills, American chemical engineer (b. 1897)
- November 3 – Wally Bruner, American television host and journalist (b. 1931)
- November 10 – Lloyd Cardwell, American football player and coach (b. 1913)
- November 11
  - William Alland, American actor, producer, writer and director (b. 1916)
  - Rod Milburn, American athlete (b. 1950)
- November 13 – Dawud M. Mu'Min, murderer (b. 1953)
- November 14 – Eddie Arcaro, American jockey (b. 1916)
- November 15 – Douglas MacArthur II, American diplomat (b. 1909)
- November 22 – Joanna Moore, American actress (b. 1934)
- November 23 – Hulda Crooks, American mountaineer (b. 1896)
- November 30 – Kathy Acker, American author (b. 1947)

=== December ===
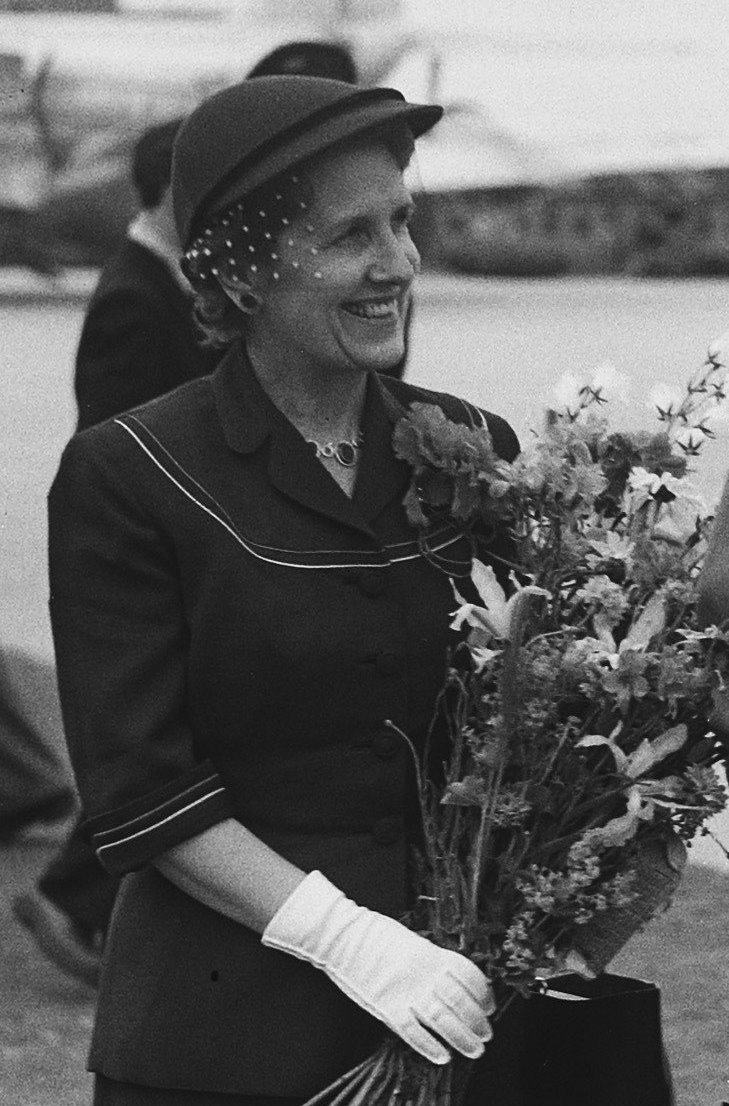
Lillian Disney

- December 2 – Michael Hedges, American composer and guitarist (b. 1953)
- December 14 – Stubby Kaye, American actor (b. 1918)
- December 16
  - Lillian Disney, American artist (b. 1899)
  - Nicolette Larson, American pop singer (b. 1952)
  - Thomas J. Parmley, American academic (b. 1897)
- December 18 – Chris Farley, American actor and comedian (b. 1964)
- December 19
  - David Schramm, American astrophysicist (b. 1945)
  - Jimmy Rogers, American musician (b. 1924)
- December 20 – Denise Levertov, English-born American poet (b. 1923)
- December 21 – Amie Comeaux, American country singer (b. 1976)
- December 23 – Stanley Cortez, American cinematographer (b. 1908)
- December 25 – Denver Pyle, American actor (b. 1920)
- December 31
  - Floyd Cramer, American pianist (b. 1933)
  - Billie Dove, American actress (b. 1903)
  - Michael LeMoyne Kennedy, American socialite (b. 1958)

== See also ==
- 1997 in American soccer
- 1997 in American television
- List of American films of 1997
- Timeline of United States history (1990–2009)
