= List of acts of the 105th United States Congress =

The list of acts of the 105th United States Congress includes all Acts of Congress and ratified treaties by the 105th United States Congress, which lasted from January 3, 1997 to January 3, 1999.

Acts include public and private laws, which are enacted after being passed by Congress and signed by the President, however if the President vetoes a bill it can still be enacted by a two-thirds vote in both houses. The Senate alone considers treaties, which are ratified by a two-thirds vote.

== Summary of actions ==
President William J. Clinton vetoed the following acts of this Congress. (List of United States presidential vetoes#Bill Clinton).

1. June 9, 1997: Vetoed H.R. 1469, Supplemental Appropriations and Recissions Act, FY 1997. No override attempt made.
2. October 10, 1997: Vetoed H.R. 1122, the second attempted partial birth abortion ban. Overridden by House, 296–132 (286 needed). Override attempt failed in Senate, 64–36 (67 needed).
3. November 13, 1997: Vetoed H.R. 2631, a line item veto override bill.[29] Overridden by House, 347–69 (278 needed). Overridden by Senate, 78–20 (66 needed), and enacted as Pub.L. 105–159 over the president's veto.
4. May 20, 1998: Vetoed S. 1502, District of Columbia Student Opportunity Scholarship Act of 1997. No override attempt made
5. June 23, 1998: Vetoed H.R. 2709, Temporary Increase in the Statutory Debt Limit. No override attempt made.
6. July 21, 1998: Vetoed H.R. 2646, Education Savings and School Excellence Act of 1998. No override attempt made.
7. October 7, 1998: Vetoed H.R. 4101, Foreign Affairs Reform and Restructuring Act of 1998. No override attempt made.
8. October 21, 1998: Vetoed H.R. 1757, Foreign Affairs Reform and Restructuring Act of 1998. No override attempt made.

== Public laws ==
Public law number (Linked to Wikisource)	Date of enactment	Official short title	Description	Link to Legislink.org
105-1	February 3, 1997	(No short title)	Making technical corrections to the Omnibus Consolidated Appropriations Act, 1997 (Pub. L. 104–208 (text) (PDF)), and for other purposes.	Pub. L. 105–1 (text) (PDF)
105-2	February 28, 1997	Airport and Airway Trust Fund Tax Reinstatement Act of 1997	To amend the Internal Revenue Code of 1986 to reinstate the Airport and Airway Trust Fund excise taxes, and for other purposes	Pub. L. 105–2 (text) (PDF)
105-3	February 28, 1997	(No short title)	Approving the Presidential finding that the limitation on obligations imposed by section 518A(a) of the Foreign Operations Export Financing, and Related Programs Appropriations Act of 1997, is having a negative impact on the proper functioning of the population planning program	Pub. L. 105–3 (text) (PDF)
105-4	March 3, 1997	(No short title)	An Act to designate the facility of the United States Postal Service under construction at 7411 Barlite Boulevard in San Antonio, Texas, as the "Frank M. Tejeda Post Office Building"	Pub. L. 105–4 (text) (PDF)
105-5	March 17, 1997	(No short title)	Joint resolution waiving certain provisions of the Trade Act of 1974 relating to the appointment of the United States Trade Representative	Pub. L. 105–5 (text) (PDF)
105-6	March 19, 1997	Victim Rights Clarification Act of 1997	To amend title 18, United States Code, to give further assurance to the right of victims of crime to attend and observe the trials of those accused of the crime	Pub. L. 105–6 (text) (PDF)
105-7	March 25, 1997	District of Columbia Inspector General Improvement Act of 1997	To permit the waiver of District of Columbia residency requirements for certain employees of the Office of the Inspector General of the District of Columbia, and for other purposes	Pub. L. 105–7 (text) (PDF)
105-8	March 31, 1997	(No short title)	An Act to extend the effective date of the Investment Advisers Supervision Coordination Act	Pub. L. 105–8 (text) (PDF)
105-9	April 14, 1997	Oroville-Tonasket Claims Settlement and Conveyance Act	To approve a settlement agreement between the Bureau of Reclamation and the Oroville-Tonasket Irrigation District	Pub. L. 105–9 (text) (PDF)
105-10	April 24, 1997	(No short title)	An Act to designate the J. Phil Campbell, Senior, Natural Resource Conservation Center	Pub. L. 105–10 (text) (PDF)
105-11	April 25, 1997	(No short title)	An Act to make a technical correction to title 28, United States Code, relating to jurisdiction for lawsuits against terrorist states	Pub. L. 105–11 (text) (PDF)
105-12	April 30, 1997	Assisted Suicide Funding Restriction Act of 1997	To clarify Federal law with respect to restricting the use of Federal funds in support of assisted suicide	Pub. L. 105–12 (text) (PDF)
105-13	May 14, 1997	(No short title)	An Act to extend the term of appointment of certain members of the Prospective Payment Assessment Commission and the Physician Payment Review Commission	Pub. L. 105–13 (text) (PDF)
105-14	May 14, 1997	(No short title)	An Act to authorize the President to award a gold medal on behalf of the Congress to Francis Albert "Frank" Sinatra in recognition of his outstanding and enduring contributions through his entertainment career and humanitarian activities, and for other purposes	Pub. L. 105–14 (text) (PDF)
105-15	May 15, 1997	(No short title)	An Act to amend title XVIII and XIX of the Social Security Act to permit a waiver of the prohibition of offering nurse aide training and competency evaluation programs in certain nursing facilities	Pub. L. 105–15 (text) (PDF)
105-16	June 2, 1997	(No short title)	An Act to authorize the President to award a gold medal on behalf of the Congress to Mother Teresa of Calcutta in recognition of her outstanding and enduring contributions through humanitarian and charitable activities, and for other purposes	Pub. L. 105–16 (text) (PDF)
105-17	June 4, 1997	Individuals with Disabilities Education Act Amendments of 1997	To amend the Individuals with Disabilities Education Act, to reauthorize and make improvements to that Act, and for other purposes	Pub. L. 105–17 (text) (PDF)
105-18	June 12, 1997	1997 Emergency Supplemental Appropriations Act for Recovery from Natural Disasters, and for Overseas Peacekeeping Efforts, Including Those in Bosnia	Making emergency supplemental appropriations for recovery from natural disasters, and for overseas peacekeeping efforts, including those in Bosnia, for the fiscal year ending September 30, 1997, and for other purposes; Cost of Higher Education Review Act of 1997; Depository Institutions Disaster Relief Act of 1997	Pub. L. 105–18 (text) (PDF)
105-19	June 18, 1997	Volunteer Protection Act of 1997	An Act to provide certain protections to volunteers, nonprofit organizations, and governmental entities in lawsuits based on the activities of volunteers	Pub. L. 105–19 (text) (PDF)
105-20	June 27, 1997	Drug-Free Communities Act of 1997	To amend the National Narcotics Leadership Act of 1988 to establish a program to support and encourage local communities that first demonstrate a comprehensive, long-term commitment to reduce substance abuse among youth, and for other purposes	Pub. L. 105–20 (text) (PDF)
105-21	June 27, 1997	(No short title)	An Act to consent to certain amendments enacted by the Legislature of the State of Hawaii to the Hawaiian Homes Commission Act, 1920	Pub. L. 105–21 (text) (PDF)
105-22	June 27, 1997	(No short title)	An Act to extend certain privileges, exemptions, and immunities to Hong Kong Economic and Trade Offices	Pub. L. 105–22 (text) (PDF)
105-23	July 3, 1997	(No short title)	An Act to amend section 2118 of the Energy Policy Act of 1992 to extend the Electric and Magnetic Fields Research and Public Information Dissemination Program	Pub. L. 105–23 (text) (PDF)
105-24	July 3, 1997	Riegle-Neal Amendments Act of 1997	An Act to amend Federal law to clarify the applicability of host State laws to any branch in such State of an out-of-State bank, and for other purposes; To amend the Federal Deposit Insurance Act to clarify the applicability of host State laws to any branch in such State of an out-of-State bank	Pub. L. 105–24 (text) (PDF)
105-25	July 3, 1997	(No short title)	An Act to amend the President John F. Kennedy Assassination Records Collection Act of 1992 to extend the authorization of the Assassination Records Review Board until September 30, 1998	Pub. L. 105–25 (text) (PDF)
105-26	July 3, 1997	Charitable Donation Antitrust Immunity Act of 1997	To immunize donations made in the form of charitable gift annuities and charitable remainder trusts from the antitrust laws and State laws similar to the antitrust laws	Pub. L. 105–26 (text) (PDF)
105-27	July 18, 1997	(No short title)	An Act to amend the Federal Property and Administrative Services Act of 1949 to authorize donation of surplus Federal law enforcement canines to their handlers	Pub. L. 105–27 (text) (PDF)
105-28	July 18, 1997	Department of Energy Standardization Act of 1997	To amend sections of the Department of Energy Organization Act that are obsolete or inconsistent with other statutes and to repeal a related section of the Federal Energy Administration Act of 1974	Pub. L. 105–28 (text) (PDF)
105-29	July 24, 1997	(No short title)	Joint resolution to direct the Secretary of the Interior to design and construct a permanent addition to the Franklin Delano Roosevelt Memorial in Washington, D.C., and for other purposes	Pub. L. 105–29 (text) (PDF)
105-30	July 25, 1997	(No short title)	An Act to clarify that the protections of the Federal Tort Claims Act apply to the members and personnel of the National Gambling Impact Study Commission	Pub. L. 105–30 (text) (PDF)
105-31	July 25, 1997	(No short title)	An Act to waive temporarily the Medicaid enrollment composition rule for the Better Health Plan of Amherst, New York	Pub. L. 105–31 (text) (PDF)
105-32	August 1, 1997	(No short title)	Waiving certain enrollment requirements with respect to two specified bills of the One Hundred Fifth Congress	Pub. L. 105–32 (text) (PDF)
105-33	August 5, 1997	Balanced Budget Act of 1997	To provide for reconciliation pursuant to subsections (b)(1) and (c) of section 105 of the concurrent resolution on the budget for fiscal year 1998; Budget Enforcement Act of 1997; Child Health Assistance Program Act of 1997; District of Columbia Bond Financing Improvements Act of 1997; District of Columbia Management Reform Act of 1997; District of Columbia Retirement Protection Act of 1997; Expansion of Portability and Health Insurance Coverage Act of 1997; Multifamily Assisted Housing Reform and Affordability Act of 1997; National Capital Revitalization and Self-Government Improvement Act of 1997; Veterans Reconciliation Act of 1997; Welfare Reform Technical Corrections Act of 1997	Pub. L. 105–33 (text) (PDF)
105-34	August 5, 1997	Taxpayer Relief Act of 1997	To provide for reconciliation pursuant to subsections (b)(2) and (d) of section 105 of the concurrent resolution on the budget for fiscal year 1998; Child Health Assistance Program Act of 1997; Revenue Reconciliation Act of 1997; United States-Caribbean Basin Trade Partnership Act	Pub. L. 105–34 (text) (PDF)
105-35	August 5, 1997	Taxpayer Browsing Protection Act	To amend the Internal Revenue Code of 1986 to prevent the unauthorized inspection of tax returns or tax return information	Pub. L. 105–35 (text) (PDF)
105-36	August 5, 1997	National Geologic Mapping Reauthorization Act of 1997	To reauthorize and amend the National Geologic Mapping Act of 1992, and for other purposes	Pub. L. 105–36 (text) (PDF)
105-37	August 7, 1997	New Mexico Statehood and Enabling Act Amendments of 1997	An Act to amend the Act of June 20, 1910, to protect the permanent trust funds of the State of New Mexico from erosion due to inflation and modify the basis on which distributions are made from those funds	Pub. L. 105–37 (text) (PDF)
105-38	August 8, 1997	(No short title)	An Act to amend the Immigration and Nationality Technical Corrections Act of 1994 to eliminate the special transition rule for issuance of a certificate of citizenship for certain children born outside the United States	Pub. L. 105–38 (text) (PDF)
105-39	August 11, 1997	(No short title)	An Act to direct the Secretary of the Interior to convey certain land to the City of Grants Pass, Oregon	Pub. L. 105–39 (text) (PDF)
105-40	August 11, 1997	Warner Canyon Ski Hill Land Exchange Act of 1997	To provide for a land exchange involving the Warner Canyon Ski Area and other land in the State of Oregon	Pub. L. 105–40 (text) (PDF)
105-41	August 13, 1997	Stamp Out Breast Cancer Act	To allow postal patrons to contribute to funding for breast cancer research through the voluntary purchase of certain specially issued United States postage stamps	Pub. L. 105–41 (text) (PDF)
105-42	August 15, 1997	International Dolphin Conservation Program Act	To amend the Marine Mammal Protection Act of 1972 to support the International Dolphin Conservation Program in the eastern tropical Pacific Ocean, and for other purposes	Pub. L. 105–42 (text) (PDF)
105-43	September 17, 1997	Need-Based Educational Aid Antitrust Protection Act of 1997	To continue favorable treatment for need-based educational aid under the antitrust laws	Pub. L. 105–43 (text) (PDF)
105-44	September 30, 1997	(No short title)	An Act to designate the reservoir created by Trinity Dam in the Central Valley project, California, as "Trinity Lake"	Pub. L. 105–44 (text) (PDF)
105-45	September 30, 1997	Military Construction Appropriations Act, 1998	Making appropriations for military construction, family housing, and base realignment and closure for the Department of Defense for the fiscal year ending September 30, 1998, and for other purposes	Pub. L. 105–45 (text) (PDF)
105-46	September 30, 1997	Continuing Appropriation (first)	Making continuing appropriations for the fiscal year 1998, and for other purposes	Pub. L. 105–46 (text) (PDF)
105-47	October 1, 1997	(No short title)	An Act to authorize appropriations for carrying out the Earthquake Hazards Reduction Act of 1977 for fiscal years 1998 and 1999, and for other purposes	Pub. L. 105–47 (text) (PDF)
105-48	October 1, 1997	(No short title)	An original bill to provide permanent authority for the administration of au pair programs	Pub. L. 105–48 (text) (PDF)
105-49	October 6, 1997	(No short title)	An Act to authorize the Secretary of Agriculture to convey a parcel of unused agricultural land in Dos Palos, California, to the Dos Palos Ag Boosters for use as a farm school	Pub. L. 105–49 (text) (PDF)
105-50	October 6, 1997	(No short title)	An Act to amend the Federal Property and Administrative Services Act of 1949 to authorize the transfer to States of surplus personal property for donation to nonprofit providers of necessaries to impoverished families and individuals	Pub. L. 105–50 (text) (PDF)
105-51	October 6, 1997	(No short title)	An Act to authorize the President to award a gold medal on behalf of the Congress to Ecumenical Patriarch Bartholomew in recognition of his outstanding and enduring contributions toward religious understanding and peace, and for other purposes	Pub. L. 105–51 (text) (PDF)
105-52	October 6, 1997	(No short title)	An Act to designate the Federal building located at 601 Fourth Street, N.W., in the District of Columbia, as the "Federal Bureau of Investigation, Washington Field Office Memorial Building", in honor of William H. Christian, Jr., Martha Dixon Martinez, Michael J. Miller, Anthony Palmisano, and Edwin R. Woodriffe	Pub. L. 105–52 (text) (PDF)
105-53	October 6, 1997	(No short title)	An Act to provide for the authorization of appropriations in each fiscal year for arbitration in United States district courts	Pub. L. 105–53 (text) (PDF)
105-54	October 6, 1997	Religious Workers Act of 1997	An Act to amend the Immigration and Nationality Act to extend the special immigrant religious worker program, to amend the Illegal Immigration Reform and Immigrant Responsibility Act of 1996 to extend the deadline for designation of an effective date for paperwork changes in the employer sanctions program, and to require the Secretary of State to waive or reduce the fee for application and issuance of a nonimmigrant visa for aliens coming to the United States for certain charitable purposes	Pub. L. 105–54 (text) (PDF)
105-55	October 7, 1997	Legislative Branch Appropriations Act, 1998	Making appropriations for the Legislative Branch for the fiscal year ending September 30, 1998, and for other purposes; Congressional Operations Appropriations Act, 1998	Pub. L. 105–55 (text) (PDF)
105-56	October 8, 1997	Department of Defense Appropriations Act, 1998	Making appropriations for the Department of Defense for the fiscal year ending September 30, 1998, and for other purposes	Pub. L. 105–56 (text) (PDF)
105-57	October 9, 1997	National Wildlife Refuge System Improvement Act of 1997	To amend the National Wildlife Refuge System Administration Act of 1966 to improve the management of the National Wildlife Refuge System, and for other purposes	Pub. L. 105–57 (text) (PDF)
105-58	October 9, 1997	Oklahoma City National Memorial Act of 1997	An Act to establish the Oklahoma City National Memorial as a unit of the National Park System; to designate the Oklahoma City Memorial Trust, and for other purposes	Pub. L. 105–58 (text) (PDF)
105-59	October 10, 1997	(No short title)	An Act to provide for the release of the reversionary interest held by the United States in certain property located in the County of Iosco, Michigan	Pub. L. 105–59 (text) (PDF)
105-60	October 10, 1997	Hood Bay Land Exchange Act of 1997	To provide for the exchange of lands within Admiralty Island National Monument, and for other purposes	Pub. L. 105–60 (text) (PDF)
105-61	October 10, 1997	Treasury and General Government Appropriations Act, 1998	Making appropriations for the Treasury Department, the United States Postal Service, the Executive Office of the President, and certain Independent Agencies, for the fiscal year ending September 30, 1998, and for other purposes; Executive Office Appropriations Act, 1998; Federal Employees' Retirement System Open Enrollment Act of 1997; Independent Agencies Appropriations Act, 1998; Postal Service Appropriations Act, 1998; Treasury Department Appropriations Act, 1998	Pub. L. 105–61 (text) (PDF)
105-62	October 13, 1997	Energy and Water Development Appropriations Act, 1998	Making appropriations for energy and water development for the fiscal year ending September 30, 1998, and for other purposes	Pub. L. 105–62 (text) (PDF)
105-63	October 22, 1997	Treasury, Postal Service, and General Government Appropriations Act, 1998	An Act to designate the United States courthouse at 500 State Avenue in Kansas City, Kansas, as the "Robert J. Dole United States Courthouse"	Pub. L. 105–63 (text) (PDF)
105-64	October 23, 1997	Continuing Appropriation (second)	Making further continuing appropriations for the fiscal year 1998, and for other purposes	Pub. L. 105–64 (text) (PDF)
105-65	October 27, 1997	Departments of Veterans Affairs and Housing and Urban Development, and Independent Agencies Appropriations Act, 1998	Making appropriations for the Departments of Veterans Affairs and Housing and Urban Development, and for sundry independent agencies, commissions, corporations, and offices for the fiscal year ending September 30, 1998, and for other purposes	Pub. L. 105–65 (text) (PDF)
105-66	October 27, 1997	Department of Transportation and Related Agencies Appropriations Act, 1998	Making appropriations for the Department of Transportation and related agencies for the fiscal year ending September 30, 1998, and for other purposes; Amtrak Route Closure and Realignment Act of 1997	Pub. L. 105–66 (text) (PDF)
105-67	October 30, 1997	(No short title)	An Act to confer status as an honorary veteran of the United States Armed Forces on Leslie Townes (Bob) Hope	Pub. L. 105–67 (text) (PDF)
105-68	November 7, 1997	Continuing Appropriation (third)	Making further continuing appropriations for the fiscal year 1998, and for other purposes	Pub. L. 105–68 (text) (PDF)
105-69	November 9, 1997	Continuing Appropriation (fourth)	Making further continuing appropriations for the fiscal year 1998, and for other purposes	Pub. L. 105–69 (text) (PDF)
105-70	November 10, 1997	(No short title)	An Act to designate the facility of the United States Postal Service located at 551 Kingstown Road in South Kingstown, Rhode Island, as the "David B. Champagne Post Office Building"	Pub. L. 105–70 (text) (PDF)
105-71	November 10, 1997	Continuing Appropriation (fifth)	Making further continuing appropriations for the fiscal year 1998, and for other purposes	Pub. L. 105–71 (text) (PDF)
105-72	November 10, 1997	(No short title)	An Act to amend title I of the Employee Retirement Income Security Act of 1974 to clarify treatment of investment managers under such title	Pub. L. 105–72 (text) (PDF)
105-73	November 12, 1997	(No short title)	An Act to amend the Immigration and Nationality Act to exempt internationally adopted children under age 10 from the immunization requirement	Pub. L. 105–73 (text) (PDF)
105-74	November 12, 1997	(No short title)	An Act to require the Secretary of the Interior to exchange certain lands located in Hinsdale County, Colorado	Pub. L. 105–74 (text) (PDF)
105-75	November 12, 1997	(No short title)	An Act to provide for the expansion of the Eagles Nest Wilderness within the Arapaho National Forest and the White River National Forest, Colorado, to include land known as the Slate Creek Addition	Pub. L. 105–75 (text) (PDF)
105-76	November 12, 1997	(No short title)	An Act to provide for a boundary adjustment and land conveyance involving the Raggeds Wilderness, White River National Forest, Colorado, to correct the effects of earlier erroneous land surveys	Pub. L. 105–76 (text) (PDF)
105-77	November 12, 1997	(No short title)	An Act to transfer the Dillon Ranger District in the Arapaho National Forest to the White River National Forest in the State of Colorado	Pub. L. 105–77 (text) (PDF)
105-78	November 13, 1997	Departments of Labor, Health and Human Services, and Education, and Related Agencies Appropriations Act, 1998	Making appropriations for the Departments of Labor, Health and Human Services, and Education, and related agencies for the fiscal year ending September 30, 1998, and for other purposes; Comprehensive Fetal Alcohol Syndrome Prevention Act; Department of Education Appropriations Act, 1998; Department of Health and Human Services Appropriations Act, 1998; Department of Labor Appropriations Act, 1998; Emergency Student Loan Consolidation Act of 1997; Morris K. Udall Parkinson's Research Act of 1997; National Health Museum Development Act	Pub. L. 105–78 (text) (PDF)
105-79	November 13, 1997	Hoopa Valley Reservation South Boundary Adjustment Act	To provide for the conveyance of certain land in the Six Rivers National Forest in the State of California for the benefit of the Hoopa Valley Tribe	Pub. L. 105–79 (text) (PDF)
105-80	November 13, 1997	(No short title)	An Act to make technical amendments to certain provisions of title 17, United States Code	Pub. L. 105–80 (text) (PDF)
105-81	November 13, 1997	(No short title)	An Act to require the Secretary of the Interior to conduct a study concerning grazing use of certain land within and adjacent to Grand Teton National Park Wyoming, and to extend temporarily certain grazing privileges	Pub. L. 105–81 (text) (PDF)
105-82	November 13, 1997	Marjory Stoneman Douglas Wilderness and Ernest F. Coe Visitor Center Designation Act	An Act to designate the Marjory Stoneman Douglas Wilderness and the Ernest F. Coe Visitor Center	Pub. L. 105–82 (text) (PDF)
105-83	November 14, 1997	Department of the Interior and Related Agencies Appropriations Act, 1998	Making appropriations for the Department of the Interior and related agencies for the fiscal year ending September 30, 1998, and for other purposes; Androscoggin River Valley Heritage Area Act; Deficit Reduction Lock-box Act of 1997; Forest Resources Conservation and Shortage Relief Act of 1997; Miccosukee Settlement Act of 1997	Pub. L. 105–83 (text) (PDF)
105-84	November 14, 1997	Continuing Appropriation (sixth)	Making further continuing appropriations for the fiscal year 1998, and for other purposes	Pub. L. 105–84 (text) (PDF)
105-85	November 18, 1997	National Defense Authorization Act for Fiscal Year 1998	An Act to authorize appropriations for fiscal year 1998 for military activities of the Department of Defense, for military construction, and for defense activities of the Department of Energy, to prescribe personnel strengths for such fiscal year for the Armed Forces, and for other purposes; To authorize appropriations for fiscal years 1998 and 1999 for military activities of the Department of Defense, to prescribe military personnel strengths for fiscal years 1998 and 1999, and for other purposes; Military Construction Authorization Act for Fiscal Year 1998; Military Voting Rights Act of 1997; National Defense Authorization Act for Fiscal Years 1998 and 1999; Panama Canal Commission Authorization Act for Fiscal Year 1998; Panama Canal Transition Facilitation Act of 1997; Sikes Act Improvement Act of 1997; Sikes Act Improvement Amendments of 1997	Pub. L. 105–85 (text) (PDF)
105-86	November 18, 1997	Agriculture, Rural Development, Food and Drug Administration, and Related Agencies Appropriations Act, 1998	Making appropriations for Agriculture, Rural Development, Food and Drug Administration, and Related Agencies programs for the fiscal year ending September 30, 1998, and for other purposes	Pub. L. 105–86 (text) (PDF)
105-87	November 19, 1997	(No short title)	An Act to designate the United States Post Office building located at 153 East 110th Street, New York, New York, as the "Oscar Garcia Rivera Post Office Building"	Pub. L. 105–87 (text) (PDF)
105-88	November 19, 1997	(No short title)	An Act to designate the United States Post Office building located at 313 East Broadway in Glendale, California, as the "Carlos J. Moorhead Post Office Building"	Pub. L. 105–88 (text) (PDF)
105-89	November 19, 1997	Adoption and Safe Families Act of 1997	To promote the adoption of children in foster care; Adoption Promotion Act of 1997; Promotion of Adoption, Safety, and Support for Abused and Neglected Children (PASS) Act	Pub. L. 105–89 (text) (PDF)
105-90	November 19, 1997	(No short title)	An Act to designate the building in Indianapolis, Indiana, which houses the operations of the Circle City Station Post Office as the "Andrew Jacobs, Jr. Post Office Building"	Pub. L. 105–90 (text) (PDF)
105-91	November 19, 1997	(No short title)	An Act to designate the facility of the United States Postal Service under construction at 150 West Margaret Drive in Terre Haute, Indiana, as the "John T. Myers Post Office Building"	Pub. L. 105–91 (text) (PDF)
105-92	November 19, 1997	Savings are Vital to Everyone's Retirement Act of 1997	To amend title I of the Employee Retirement Income Security Act of 1974 to encourage retirement income savings	Pub. L. 105–92 (text) (PDF)
105-93	November 19, 1997	(No short title)	An Act to designate the Federal building and United States courthouse located at 300 Northeast First Avenue in Miami, Florida, as the "David W. Dyer Federal Courthouse"	Pub. L. 105–93 (text) (PDF)
105-94	November 19, 1997	(No short title)	An Act to redesignate the Dublin Federal Courthouse building located in Dublin, Georgia, as the J. Roy Rowland Federal Courthouse	Pub. L. 105–94 (text) (PDF)
105-95	November 19, 1997	John F. Kennedy Center Parking Improvement Act of 1997	To amend the John F. Kennedy Center Act to authorize the design and construction of additions to the parking garage and certain site improvements, and for other purposes	Pub. L. 105–95 (text) (PDF)
105-96	November 19, 1997	Asian Elephant Conservation Act of 1997	To assist in the conservation of Asian elephants by supporting and providing financial resources for the conservation programs of nations within the range of Asian elephants and projects of persons with demonstrated expertise in the conservation of Asian elephants	Pub. L. 105–96 (text) (PDF)
105-97	November 19, 1997	(No short title)	An Act to designate the United States Post Office located at 150 North 3rd Street in Steubenville, Ohio, as the "Douglas Applegate Post Office"	Pub. L. 105–97 (text) (PDF)
105-98	November 19, 1997	Veterans' Compensation Rate Amendments of 1997	To increase, effective as of December 1, 1997, the rates of compensation for veterans with service-connected disabilities and the rates of dependency and indemnity compensation for the survivors of certain disabled veterans; Veterans' Compensation Cost-of-Living Adjustment Act of 1997	Pub. L. 105–98 (text) (PDF)
105-99	November 19, 1997	(No short title)	An Act to designate the United States Post Office located at 450 North Centre Street in Pottsville, Pennsylvania, as the "Peter J. McCloskey Postal Facility"	Pub. L. 105–99 (text) (PDF)
105-100	November 19, 1997	District of Columbia Appropriations, Medical Liability Reform, and Education Reform Act of 1998	An Act making omnibus consolidated appropriations for the fiscal year ending September 30, 1998, and for other purposes; Making appropriations for the government of the District of Columbia and other activities chargeable in whole or in part against the revenues of said District for the fiscal year ending September 30, 1998, and for other purposes; Departments of Commerce, Justice, and State, the Judiciary, and Related Agencies Appropriations Act, 1998; District of Columbia Appropriations Act, 1998; District of Columbia Education Reform Amendments Act of 1997; District of Columbia Medical Liability Reform Act of 1997; European Security Act of 1997; Foreign Affairs Agencies Consolidation Act of 1997; Foreign Affairs Reform and Restructuring Act of 1997; Foreign Operations, Export Financing, and Related Programs Appropriations Act, 1998; Foreign Relations Authorization Act, Fiscal Years 1998 and 1999; Judiciary Appropriations Act, 1998; Nation's Capital Bicentennial Designation Act; Nicaraguan Adjustment and Central American Relief Act; Philippine Army, Scouts, and Guerilla Veterans of World War II Naturalization Act of 1997; United Nations Reform Act of 1997	Pub. L. 105–100 (text) (PDF)
105-101	November 19, 1997	Veterans' Cemetery Protection Act of 1997	An Act to amend chapter 91 of title 18, United States Code, to provide criminal penalties for theft and willful vandalism at national cemeteries	Pub. L. 105–101 (text) (PDF)
105-102	November 20, 1997	(No short title)	An Act to codify without substantive change laws related to transportation and to improve the United States Code	Pub. L. 105–102 (text) (PDF)
105-103	November 20, 1997	(No short title)	An Act to waive time limitations specified by law in order to allow the Medal of Honor to be awarded to Robert R. Ingram of Jacksonville, Florida, for acts of valor while a Navy Hospital Corpsman in the Republic of Vietnam during the Vietnam conflict	Pub. L. 105–103 (text) (PDF)
105-104	November 20, 1997	(No short title)	Granting the consent of Congress to the Apalachicola-Chattahoochee-Flint River Basin Compact	Pub. L. 105–104 (text) (PDF)
105-105	November 20, 1997	Alabama-Coosa-Tallapoosa River Basin Compact	Granting the consent of Congress to the Alabama-Coosa-Tallapoosa River Basin Compact	Pub. L. 105–105 (text) (PDF)
105-106	November 20, 1997	(No short title)	An Act to provide for the acquisition of the Plains Railroad Depot at the Jimmy Carter National Historic Site	Pub. L. 105–106 (text) (PDF)
105-107	November 20, 1997	Intelligence Authorization Act for Fiscal Year 1998	An original bill to authorize appropriations for fiscal year 1998 for intelligence and intelligence-related activities of the United States Government, the Community Management Account, and the Central Intelligence Agency Retirement and Disability System, and for other purposes	Pub. L. 105–107 (text) (PDF)
105-108	November 20, 1997	United States Fire Administration Authorization Act for Fiscal Years 1998 and 1999	An Act to authorize appropriations for fiscal years 1998 and 1999 for the United States Fire Administration, and for other purposes	Pub. L. 105–108 (text) (PDF)
105-109	November 20, 1997	(No short title)	An Act to permit the city of Cleveland, Ohio, to convey certain lands that the United States conveyed to the city	Pub. L. 105–109 (text) (PDF)
105-110	November 20, 1997	(No short title)	An Act to amend the Act incorporating the American Legion to make a technical correction	Pub. L. 105–110 (text) (PDF)
105-111	November 21, 1997	(No short title)	An Act to amend title 38, United States Code, to allow revision of veterans benefits decisions based on clear and unmistakable error	Pub. L. 105–111 (text) (PDF)
105-112	November 21, 1997	Law Enforcement Technology Advertisement Clarification Act of 1997	To provide a law enforcement exception to the prohibition on the advertising of certain electronic devices	Pub. L. 105–112 (text) (PDF)
105-113	November 21, 1997	Census of Agriculture Act of 1997	To transfer to the Secretary of Agriculture the authority to conduct the census of agriculture, and for other purposes	Pub. L. 105–113 (text) (PDF)
105-114	November 21, 1997	Veterans' Benefits Act of 1997	An Act to make permanent the Native American Veteran Housing Loan Pilot Program of the Department of Veterans Affairs; An Act to extend and improve the Native American Veteran Housing Loan Pilot Program of the Department of Veterans Affairs, to extend certain authorities of the Secretary of Veterans Affairs relating to services for homeless veterans, to extend certain other authorities of the Secretary, and for other purposes	Pub. L. 105–114 (text) (PDF)
105-115	November 21, 1997	Food and Drug Administration Modernization Act of 1997	An Act to amend the Federal Food, Drug, and Cosmetic Act and the Public Health Service Act to improve the regulation of food, drugs, devices, and biological products, and for other purposes; Food and Drug Administration Modernization and Accountability Act of 1997; Food and Drug Administration Regulatory Modernizaton Act of 1997; Prescription Drug Users Fee Reauthorization Act of 1997	Pub. L. 105–115 (text) (PDF)
105-116	November 21, 1997	(No short title)	An Act to amend title 38, United States Code, to prohibit interment or memorialization in certain cemeteries of persons committing Federal or State capital crimes	Pub. L. 105–116 (text) (PDF)
105-117	November 21, 1997	(No short title)	An Act to amend the Uniform Relocation Assistance and Real Property Acquisition Policies Act of 1970 to prohibit an alien who is not lawfully present in the United States from receiving assistance under that Act	Pub. L. 105–117 (text) (PDF)
105-118	November 26, 1997	Foreign Operations, Export Financing, and Related Programs Appropriations Act, 1998	Making appropriations for foreign operations, export financing, and related programs for the fiscal year ending September 30, 1998, and for other purposes	Pub. L. 105–118 (text) (PDF)
105-119	November 26, 1997	Departments of Commerce, Justice, and State, the Judiciary, and Related Agencies Appropriations Act, 1998	Making appropriations for the Departments of Commerce, Justice, and State, the Judiciary, and related agencies for the fiscal year ending September 30, 1998, and for other purposes; Department of Commerce and Related Agencies Appropriations Act, 1998; Department of Justice Appropriations Act, 1998; Department of State and Related Agencies Appropriations Act, 1998; Judiciary Appropriations Act, 1998; Ninth Circuit Court of Appeals Reorganization Act of 1997; Philippine Army, Scouts, and Guerilla Veterans of World War II Naturalization Act of 1997	Pub. L. 105–119 (text) (PDF)
105-120	November 26, 1997	Philippine Army, Scouts, and Guerilla Veterans of World War II Naturalization Act of 1997	Waiving certain enrollment requirements with respect to certain specified bills of the One Hundred Fifth Congress	Pub. L. 105–120 (text) (PDF)
105-121	November 26, 1997	Export-Import Bank Reauthorization Act of 1997	An Act to reauthorize the Export-Import Bank of the United States	Pub. L. 105–121 (text) (PDF)
105-122	December 1, 1997	(No short title)	An Act to designate the United States courthouse at 200 South Washington Street in Alexandria, Virginia, as the "Martin V.B. Bostetter, Jr. United States Courthouse"	Pub. L. 105–122 (text) (PDF)
105-123	December 1, 1997	(No short title)	An Act to designate the Federal building courthouse at Public Square and Superior Avenue in Cleveland, Ohio, as the "Howard M. Metzenbaum United States Courthouse"	Pub. L. 105–123 (text) (PDF)
105-124	December 1, 1997	50 States Commemorative Coin Program Act	An Act to provide for a 10-year circulating commemorative coin program to commemorate each of the 50 States, and for other purposes; United States $1 Coin Act of 1997	Pub. L. 105–124 (text) (PDF)
105-125	December 1, 1997	(No short title)	An Act to amend the Communications Act of 1934 to provide for the designation of common carriers not subject to the jurisdiction of a State commission as eligible telecommunications carriers	Pub. L. 105–125 (text) (PDF)
105-126	December 1, 1997	(No short title)	An Act to extend the authorization of use of official mail in the location and recovery of missing children, and for other purposes	Pub. L. 105–126 (text) (PDF)
105-127	December 1, 1997	Hispanic Cultural Center Act of 1997	An Act to provide for the design, construction, furnishing and equipping of a Center for Performing Arts within the complex known as the New Mexico Hispanic Cultural Center and for other purposes	Pub. L. 105–127 (text) (PDF)
105-128	December 1, 1997	Museum and Library Services Technical and Conforming Amendments of 1997	An Act to make technical and conforming amendments to the Museum and Library Services Act, and for other purposes	Pub. L. 105–128 (text) (PDF)
105-129	December 1, 1997	(No short title)	An Act to amend the National Defense Authorization Act for Fiscal Year 1998 to make certain technical corrections	Pub. L. 105–129 (text) (PDF)
105-130	December 1, 1997	Surface Transportation Extension Act of 1997	An Act to provide a 6-month extension of highway, highway safety, and transit programs pending enactment of a law reauthorizing the Intermodal Surface Transportation Efficiency Act of 1991	Pub. L. 105–130 (text) (PDF)
105-131	December 2, 1997	(No short title)	An Act to designate the United States Post Office building located at Bennett and Kansas Avenue in Springfield, Missouri, as the "John N. Griesemer Post Office Building"	Pub. L. 105–131 (text) (PDF)
105-132	December 2, 1997	Lower Brule Sioux Tribe Infrastructure Development Trust Fund Act	An Act to provide certain benefits of the Pick-Sloan Missouri River Basin program to the Lower Brule Sioux Tribe, and for other purposes	Pub. L. 105–132 (text) (PDF)
105-133	December 2, 1997	(No short title)	An Act to provide for the establishment of not less than 2,500 Boys and Girls Clubs of America facilities by the year 2000	Pub. L. 105–133 (text) (PDF)
105-134	December 2, 1997	Amtrak Reform and Accountability Act of 1997	An Act to reform the statutes relating to Amtrak, to authorize appropriations for Amtrak, and for other purposes	Pub. L. 105–134 (text) (PDF)
105-135	December 2, 1997	Small Business Reauthorization Act of 1997	An original bill to reauthorize the programs of the Small Business Administration, and for other purposes; HUBZone Act of 1997; Small Business Programs Reauthorization and Amendments Acts of 1997	Pub. L. 105–135 (text) (PDF)
105-136	December 2, 1997	(No short title)	An Act to amend the Immigration and Nationality Act to authorize appropriations for refugee and entrant assistance for fiscal years 1998 and 1999	Pub. L. 105–136 (text) (PDF)
105-137	December 2, 1997	Aviation Insurance Reauthorization Act of 1997	An Act to amend chapter 443 of title 49, United States Code, to extend the authorization of the aviation insurance program, and for other purposes	Pub. L. 105–137 (text) (PDF)
105-138	December 2, 1997	(No short title)	An Act to provide for the design, construction, furnishing, and equipping of a Center for Historically Black Heritage within Florida A&M University	Pub. L. 105–138 (text) (PDF)
105-139	December 2, 1997	(No short title)	An Act to make technical corrections to the Nicaraguan Adjustment and Central American Relief Act	Pub. L. 105–139 (text) (PDF)
105-140	December 2, 1997	(No short title)	Joint resolution to provide for the convening of the second session of the One Hundred Fifth Congress	Pub. L. 105–140 (text) (PDF)
105-141	December 5, 1997	(No short title)	An Act to require the Attorney General to establish a program in local prisons to identify, prior to arraignment, criminal aliens and aliens who are unlawfully present in the United States, and for other purposes	Pub. L. 105–141 (text) (PDF)
105-142	December 5, 1997	(No short title)	An Act to make clarifications to the Pilot Records Improvement Act of 1996, and for other purposes	Pub. L. 105–142 (text) (PDF)
105-143	December 15, 1997	Michigan Indian Land Claims Settlement Act	To provide for the division, use, and distribution of judgment funds of the Ottawa and Chippewa Indians of Michigan pursuant to dockets numbered 18-E, 58, 364, and 18-R before the Indian Claims Commission	Pub. L. 105–143 (text) (PDF)
105-144	December 15, 1997	(No short title)	An Act to authorize acquisition of certain real property for the Library of Congress, and for other purposes	Pub. L. 105–144 (text) (PDF)
105-145	December 15, 1997	(No short title)	Granting the consent of Congress to the Chickasaw Trail Economic Development Compact	Pub. L. 105–145 (text) (PDF)
105-146	December 16, 1997	Atlantic Striped Bass Conservation Act	To reauthorize and amend the Atlantic Striped Bass Conservation Act and related laws; Atlantic Striped Bass Conservation Act Amendments of 1997	Pub. L. 105–146 (text) (PDF)
105-147	December 16, 1997	No Electronic Theft (NET) Act	To amend the provisions of titles 17 and 18, United States Code, to provide greater copyright protection by amending criminal copyright infringement provisions, and for other purposes	Pub. L. 105–147 (text) (PDF)
105-148	December 16, 1997	(No short title)	An Act to amend title 49, United States Code, to require the National Transportation Safety Board and individual foreign air carriers to address the needs of families of passengers involved in aircraft accidents involving foreign air carriers	Pub. L. 105–148 (text) (PDF)
105-149	December 16, 1997	(No short title)	An Act to amend the Federal charter for Group Hospitalization and Medical Services, Inc., and for other purposes	Pub. L. 105–149 (text) (PDF)
105-150	December 16, 1997	(No short title)	An Act to amend section 13031 of the Consolidated Omnibus Budget Reconciliation Act of 1985, relating to customs user fees, to allow the use of such fees to provide for customs inspectional personnel in connection with the arrival of passengers in Florida, and for other purposes	Pub. L. 105–150 (text) (PDF)
105-151	December 16, 1997	(No short title)	Granting the consent and approval of Congress for the State of Maryland, the Commonwealth of Virginia, and the District of Columbia to amend the Washington Metropolitan Area Transit Regulation Compact	Pub. L. 105–151 (text) (PDF)
105-152	December 17, 1997	Army Reserve-National Guard Equity Reimbursement Act	To authorize the reimbursement of members of the Army deployed to Europe in support of operations in Bosnia for certain out-of-pocket expenses incurred by the members during the period beginning on October 1, 1996, and ending on May 31, 1997	Pub. L. 105–152 (text) (PDF)
105-153	December 17, 1997	Federal Advisory Committee Act Amendments of 1997	To amend the Federal Advisory Committee Act to clarify public disclosure requirements that are applicable to the National Academy of Sciences and the National Academy of Public Administration	Pub. L. 105–153 (text) (PDF)
105-154	February 6, 1998	(No short title)	An Act to rename the Washington National Airport located in the District of Columbia and Virginia as the "Ronald Reagan Washington National Airport"	Pub. L. 105–154 (text) (PDF)
105-155	February 11, 1998	FAA Research, Engineering, and Development Authorization Act of 1998	An Act to authorize the Federal Aviation Administration's research, engineering, and development programs for fiscal years 1998 and 1999, and for other purposes; To authorize the Federal Aviation Administration's research, engineering, and development programs for fiscal years 1998 through 2000, and for other purposes; FAA Research, Engineering, and Development Authorization Act of 1997	Pub. L. 105–155 (text) (PDF)
105-156	February 11, 1998	Environmental Policy and Conflict Resolution Act of 1997	To amend the Morris K. Udall Scholarship and Excellence in National Environmental and Native American Public Policy Act of 1992 to establish the United States Institute for Environmental Conflict Resolution to conduct environmental conflict resolution and training, and for other purposes	Pub. L. 105–156 (text) (PDF)
105-157	February 11, 1998	FAA Research, Engineering, and Development Authorization Act of 1997	An Act to authorize the Secretary of Transportation to issue a certificate of documentation with appropriate endorsement for employment in the coastwise trade for the vessel PRINCE NOVA, and for other purposes	Pub. L. 105–157 (text) (PDF)
105-158	February 13, 1998	Holocaust Victims Redress Act	An Act to provide redress for inadequate restitution of assets seized by the United States Government during World War II which belonged to victims of the Holocaust, and for other purposes	Pub. L. 105–158 (text) (PDF)
105-159	February 25, 1998	(No short title)	Disapproving the cancellations transmitted by the President on October 6, 1997, regarding Public Law 105–45.	Pub. L. 105–159 (text) (PDF)
105-160	March 6, 1998	National Sea Grant College Program Reauthorization Act of 1998	An Act to reauthorize the Sea Grant Program; National Sea Grant College Program Reauthorization Act of 1997; Ocean and Coastal Research Revitalization Act of 1997	Pub. L. 105–160 (text) (PDF)
105-161	March 9, 1998	(No short title)	An Act to designate the United States Post Office building located at 750 Highway 28 East in Taylorsville, Mississippi, as the "Blaine H. Eaton Post Office Building"	Pub. L. 105–161 (text) (PDF)
105-162	March 9, 1998	(No short title)	An Act to designate the post office located at 194 Ward Street in Paterson, New Jersey, as the "Larry Doby Post Office"	Pub. L. 105–162 (text) (PDF)
105-163	March 20, 1998	(No short title)	An Act to designate the Federal building and United States courthouse located at 475 Mulberry Street in Macon, Georgia, as the "William Augustus Bootle Federal Building and United States Courthouse"	Pub. L. 105–163 (text) (PDF)
105-164	March 20, 1998	Examination Parity and Year 2000 Readiness for Financial Institutions Act	To address the Year 2000 computer problems with regard to financial institutions, to extend examination parity to the Director of the Office of Thrift Supervision and the National Credit Union Administration, and for other purposes	Pub. L. 105–164 (text) (PDF)
105-165	March 20, 1998	(No short title)	An Act to designate the Federal building located at 61 Forsyth Street SW., in Atlanta, Georgia, as the "Sam Nunn Atlanta Federal Center."	Pub. L. 105–165 (text) (PDF)
105-166	April 6, 1998	Lobbying Disclosure Technical Amendments Act of 1998	An Act to make certain technical corrections to the Lobbying Disclosure Act of 1995; Lobbying Disclosure Technical Amendments Act of 1997	Pub. L. 105–166 (text) (PDF)
105-167	April 13, 1998	(No short title)	An Act to consolidate certain mineral interests in the National Grasslands in Billings County, North Dakota, through the exchange of Federal and private mineral interests to enhance land management capabilities and environmental and wildlife protection, and for other purposes	Pub. L. 105–167 (text) (PDF)
105-168	April 21, 1998	Birth Defects Prevention Act of 1998	An Act to provide surveillance, research, and services aimed at prevention of birth defects, and for other purposes; Birth Defects Prevention Act of 1997	Pub. L. 105–168 (text) (PDF)
105-169	April 24, 1998	(No short title)	An Act to provide for the conveyance of the reversionary interest of the United States in certain lands to the Clint Independent School District and the Fabens Independent School District	Pub. L. 105–169 (text) (PDF)
105-170	April 24, 1998	Aviation Medical Assistance Act of 1998	To direct the Administrator of the Federal Aviation Administration to reevaluate the equipment in medical kits carried on, and to make a decision regarding requiring automatic external defilbrillators to be carried on, aircraft operated by air carriers, and for other purposes; Aviation Medical Assistance Act of 1997	Pub. L. 105–170 (text) (PDF)
105-171	April 24, 1998	(No short title)	An Act to authorize the Secretary of Agriculture to convey certain lands and improvements in the State of Virginia, and for other purposes	Pub. L. 105–171 (text) (PDF)
105-172	April 24, 1998	Wireless Telephone Protection Act	An Act to amend title 18, United States Code, with respect to scanning receivers and similar devices; Cellular Telephone Protection Act	Pub. L. 105–172 (text) (PDF)
105-173	April 27, 1998	Visa Waiver Pilot Program Reauthorization Act of 1997	An Act to amend the Immigration and Nationality Act to modify and extend the visa waiver pilot program, and to provide for the collection of data with respect to the number of nonimmigrants who remain in the United States after the expiration of the period of stay authorized by the Attorney General	Pub. L. 105–173 (text) (PDF)
105-174	May 1, 1998	(No short title)	Making emergency supplemental appropriations for the fiscal year ending September 30, 1998, and for other purposes; 1998 Emergency Supplemental Appropriations Act; 1998 Supplemental Appropriations Act for the International Monetary Fund; Agricultural Credit Restoration Act; Emergency Supplemental Appropriations Act; Emergency Trade Deficit Review Commission Act; Petroglyph National Monument Boundary Adjustment Act; Safe Schools Security Act of 1998	Pub. L. 105–174 (text) (PDF)
105-175	May 11, 1998	(No short title)	A joint resolution expressing the sense of the Congress on the occasion of the 50th anniversary of the founding of the modern State of Israel and reaffirming the bonds of friendship and cooperation between the United States and Israel	Pub. L. 105–175 (text) (PDF)
105-176	May 29, 1998	(No short title)	An Act to amend chapter 51 of title 31, United States Code, to allow the Secretary of the Treasury greater discretion with regard to the placement of the required inscriptions on quarter dollars issued under the 50 States Commemorative Coin Program	Pub. L. 105–176 (text) (PDF)
105-177	June 1, 1998	(No short title)	An Act to extend certain programs under the Energy Policy and Conservation Act	Pub. L. 105–177 (text) (PDF)
105-178	June 9, 1998	Transportation Equity Act for the 21st Century	To authorize funds for Federal-aid highways, highway safety programs, and transit programs, and for other purposes; Building Efficient Surface Transportation and Equity Act of 1997; Building Efficient Surface Transportation and Equity Act of 1998; Federal Transit Act of 1998; Intelligent Transportation Systems Act of 1998; Intermodal Surface Transportation Efficiency Act of 1998; Intermodal Surface Transportation Revenue Act of 1998; Intermodal Transportation Safety Act of 1998; National Highway Traffic Safety Administration Reauthorization Act of 1998; Recreational Boating Safety Improvement Act of 1998; Sportfishing and Boating Safety Act of 1998; Surface Transportation Act of 1998; Surface Transportation Revenue Act of 1998; Transportation Infrastructure Finance and Innovation Act of 1998; Veterans Benefits Act of 1998	Pub. L. 105–178 (text) (PDF)
105-179	June 16, 1998	(No short title)	An Act to redesignate the Federal building located at 717 Madison Place, NW., in the District of Columbia, as the "Howard T. Markey National Courts Building"	Pub. L. 105–179 (text) (PDF)
105-180	June 16, 1998	Care for Police Survivors Act of 1998	To amend Part L of the Omnibus Crime Control and Safe Streets Act of 1968	Pub. L. 105–180 (text) (PDF)
105-181	June 16, 1998	Bulletproof Vest Partnership Grant Act of 1998	An Act to establish a matching grant program to help States, units of local government, and Indian tribes to purchase armor vests for use by law enforcement officers; An Act to establish a matching grant program to help State and local jurisdictions purchase armor vests for use by law enforcement departments; Bulletproof Vest Partnership Act of 1998	Pub. L. 105–181 (text) (PDF)
105-182	June 19, 1998	(No short title)	An Act to extend the legislative authority for the Board of Regents of Gunston Hall to establish a memorial to honor George Mason	Pub. L. 105–182 (text) (PDF)
105-183	June 19, 1998	Religious Liberty and Charitable Donation Protection Act of 1998	An Act to amend title 11, United States Code, to protect certain charitable contributions, and for other purposes; Religious Liberty and Charitable Donation Protection Act of 1997	Pub. L. 105–183 (text) (PDF)
105-184	June 23, 1998	Telemarketing Fraud Prevention Act of 1998	To improve the criminal law relating to fraud against consumers; Telemarketing Fraud Prevention Act of 1997	Pub. L. 105–184 (text) (PDF)
105-185	June 23, 1998	Agricultural Research, Extension, and Education Reform Act of 1998	An original bill to ensure that federally funded agricultural research, extension, and education address high-priority concerns with national or multistate significance, to reform, extend, and eliminate certain agricultural research programs, and for other purposes; Agricultural Research, Extension, and Education Reauthorization Act of 1997; Agricultural Research, Extension, and Education Reform Act of 1997	Pub. L. 105–185 (text) (PDF)
105-186	June 23, 1998	U.S. Holocaust Assets Commission Act of 1998	An Act to establish a commission to examine issues pertaining to the disposition of Holocaust-era assets in the United States before, during, and after World War II, and to make recommendations to the President on further action, and for other purposes	Pub. L. 105–186 (text) (PDF)
105-187	June 24, 1998	Deadbeat Parents Punishment Act of 1998	To establish felony violations for the failure to pay legal child support obligations, and for other purposes	Pub. L. 105–187 (text) (PDF)
105-188	July 7, 1998	(No short title)	An Act to permit the mineral leasing of Indian land located within the Fort Berthold Indian reservation in any case in which there is consent from a majority interest in the parcel of land under consideration for lease	Pub. L. 105–188 (text) (PDF)
105-189	July 14, 1998	(No short title)	An Act to extend the deadline under the Federal Power Act for the construction of a hydroelectric project located in the State of Washington, and for other purposes	Pub. L. 105–189 (text) (PDF)
105-190	July 14, 1998	(No short title)	An Act to extend the deadline under the Federal Power Act for the construction of a hydroelectric project located in the State of Washington, and for other purposes	Pub. L. 105–190 (text) (PDF)
105-191	July 14, 1998	(No short title)	An Act to extend the deadline under the Federal Power Act applicable to the construction of the AuSable Hydroelectric Project in New York, and for other purposes	Pub. L. 105–191 (text) (PDF)
105-192	July 14, 1998	(No short title)	An Act to extend the deadline under the Federal Power Act for the construction of the Bear Creek hydroelectric project in the State of Washington, and for other purposes	Pub. L. 105–192 (text) (PDF)
105-193	July 14, 1998	(No short title)	An Act to extend the deadline under the Federal Power Act for the construction of a hydroelectric project located in the State of Washington, and for other purposes	Pub. L. 105–193 (text) (PDF)
105-194	July 14, 1998	Agriculture Export Relief Act of 1998	An Act to amend the Arms Export Control Act, and for other purposes	Pub. L. 105–194 (text) (PDF)
105-195	July 16, 1998	(No short title)	An Act to validate certain conveyances in the City of Tulare, Tulare County, California, and for other purposes	Pub. L. 105–195 (text) (PDF)
105-196	July 16, 1998	National Bone Marrow Registry Reauthorization Act of 1998	To amend the Public Health Service Act to revise and extend the bone marrow donor program, and for other purposes; National Marrow Donor Program Reauthorization Act of 1997	Pub. L. 105–196 (text) (PDF)
105-197	July 16, 1998	Occupational Safety and Health Administration Compliance Assistance Authorization Act of 1998	To require the Secretary of Labor to establish a program under which employers may consult with State officials respecting compliance with occupational safety and health requirements; Occupational Safety and Health Administration Compliance Assistance Authorization Act of 1997	Pub. L. 105–197 (text) (PDF)
105-198	July 16, 1998	(No short title)	An Act to amend the Occupational Safety and Health Act of 1970	Pub. L. 105–198 (text) (PDF)
105-199	July 16, 1998	National Drought Policy Act of 1998	To establish an advisory commission to provide advice and recommendations on the creation of an integrated, coordinated Federal policy designed to prepare for and respond to serious drought emergencies; National Drought Policy Act of 1997	Pub. L. 105–199 (text) (PDF)
105-200	July 16, 1998	Child Support Performance and Incentive Act of 1998	An Act to provide for an alternative penalty procedure for States that fail to meet Federal child support data processing requirements, to reform Federal incentive payments for effective child support performance, to provide for a more flexible penalty procedure for States that violate interjurisdictional adoption requirements, and for other purposes; To provide for an alternative penalty procedure for States that fail to meet Federal child support data processing requirements, to reform Federal incentive payments for effective child support performance, and to provide for a more flexible penalty procedure for States that violate interjurisdictional adoption requirements	Pub. L. 105–200 (text) (PDF)
105-201	July 16, 1998	(No short title)	A joint resolution approving the location of a Martin Luther King, Jr. Memorial in the Nation's Capitol	Pub. L. 105–201 (text) (PDF)
105-202	July 16, 1998	(No short title)	An Act to extend the legislative authority for construction of the National Peace Garden memorial, and for other purposes	Pub. L. 105–202 (text) (PDF)
105-203	July 21, 1998	National Underground Railroad Network to Freedom Act of 1998	To establish within the United States National Park Service the National Underground Railroad Network to Freedom program, and for other purposes; National Underground Railroad Network to Freedom Act of 1997	Pub. L. 105–203 (text) (PDF)
105-204	July 21, 1998	(No short title)	An Act to require the Secretary of Energy to submit to Congress a plan to ensure that all amounts accrued on the books of the United States Enrichment Corporation for the disposition of depleted uranium hexafluoride will be used to treat and recycle depleted uranium hexafluoride	Pub. L. 105–204 (text) (PDF)
105-205	July 22, 1998	(No short title)	An Act to amend chapter 87 of title 5, United States Code, with respect to the order of precedence to be applied in the payment of life insurance benefits	Pub. L. 105–205 (text) (PDF)
105-206	July 22, 1998	Internal Revenue Service Restructuring and Reform Act of 1998	To amend the Internal Revenue Code of 1986 to restructure and reform the Internal Revenue Service, and for other purposes; Internal Revenue Service Restructuring and Reform Act of 1998; TEA 21 Restoration Act; Tax Technical Corrections Act of 1997; Tax Technical Corrections Act of 1998; Taxpayer Bill of Rights 3	Pub. L. 105–206 (text) (PDF)
105-207	July 29, 1998	National Science Foundation Authorization Act of 1998	To authorize appropriations for fiscal years 1998 and 1999 for the National Science Foundation, and for other purposes; National Science Foundation Authorization Act of 1997	Pub. L. 105–207 (text) (PDF)
105-208	July 29, 1998	(No short title)	An Act to facilitate the sale of certain land in Tahoe National Forest, in the State of California to Placer County, California	Pub. L. 105–208 (text) (PDF)
105-209	July 29, 1998	(No short title)	An Act to allow for election of the Delegate from Guam by other than separate ballot, and for other purposes	Pub. L. 105–209 (text) (PDF)
105-210	July 29, 1998	(No short title)	An Act to make a minor adjustment in the exterior boundary of the Devils Backbone Wilderness in the Mark Twain National Forest, Missouri, to exclude a small parcel of land containing improvements	Pub. L. 105–210 (text) (PDF)
105-211	July 29, 1998	(No short title)	An Act to extend the deadline under the Federal Power Act applicable to the construction of FERC Project Number 3862 in the State of Iowa, and for other purposes	Pub. L. 105–211 (text) (PDF)
105-212	July 29, 1998	(No short title)	An Act to extend the deadline under the Federal Power Act applicable to the construction of FERC Project Number 9248 in the State of Colorado, and for other purposes	Pub. L. 105–212 (text) (PDF)
105-213	July 29, 1998	(No short title)	An Act to extend the time required for the construction of a hydroelectric project	Pub. L. 105–213 (text) (PDF)
105-214	July 29, 1998	Tropical Forest Conservation Act of 1998	To amend the Foreign Assistance Act of 1961 to facilitate protection of tropical forests through debt reduction with developing countries with tropical forests	Pub. L. 105–214 (text) (PDF)
105-215	July 29, 1998	(No short title)	An Act to present a congressional gold medal to Nelson Rolihlahla Mandela	Pub. L. 105–215 (text) (PDF)
105-216	July 29, 1998	Homeowners Protection Act of 1998	An Act to amend the Truth in Lending Act to require automatic cancellation and notice of cancellation rights with respect to private mortgage insurance which is required by a creditor as a condition for entering into a residential mortgage transaction, and for other purposes; An Act to require automatic cancellation and notice of cancellation rights with respect to private mortgage insurance which is required as condition for entering into a residential mortgage transaction, to abolish the Thrift Depositor Protection Oversight Board, and for other purposes; Homeowners Protection Act of 1997	Pub. L. 105–216 (text) (PDF)
105-217	August 5, 1998	African Elephant Conservation Reauthorization Act of 1998	To reauthorize the African Elephant Conservation Act; African Elephant Conservation Reauthorization Act of 1997	Pub. L. 105–217 (text) (PDF)
105-218	August 7, 1998	(No short title)	An Act to designate the United States courthouse to be constructed at the corner of Superior and Huron Roads, in Cleveland, Ohio, as the "Carl B. Stokes United States Courthouse"	Pub. L. 105–218 (text) (PDF)
105-219	August 7, 1998	Credit Union Membership Access Act	To amend the Federal Credit Union Act to clarify existing law and ratify the longstanding policy of the National Credit Union Administration Board with regard to field of membership of Federal credit unions	Pub. L. 105–219 (text) (PDF)
105-220	August 7, 1998	Workforce Investment Partnership Act of 1998	To consolidate, coordinate, and improve employment, training, literacy, and vocational rehabilitation programs in the United States, and for other purposes; Adult Education and Family Literacy Act; Adult Education and Literacy Act; Carl D. Perkins Vocational and Applied Technology Education Act of 1998; Employment, Training, and Literacy Enhancement Act of 1997; Rehabilitation Act Amendments of 1998; Tech-Prep Education Act; Twenty-First Century Workforce Commission Act	Pub. L. 105–220 (text) (PDF)
105-221	August 7, 1998	Amy Somers Volunteers at Food Banks Act	To provide that certain volunteers at private non-profit food banks are not employees for purposes of the Fair Labor Standards Act of 1938	Pub. L. 105–221 (text) (PDF)
105-222	August 7, 1998	Twenty-First Century Workforce Commission Act	An Act to designate the auditorium located within the Sandia Technology Transfer Center in Albuquerque, New Mexico, as the "Steve Schiff Auditorium"	Pub. L. 105–222 (text) (PDF)
105-223	August 7, 1998	(No short title)	An Act to establish the United States Capitol Police Memorial Fund on behalf of the families of Detective John Michael Gibson and Private First Class Jacob Joseph Chestnut of the United States Capitol Police	Pub. L. 105–223 (text) (PDF)
105-224	August 12, 1998	(No short title)	An Act to provide for the conveyance of small parcels of land in the Carson National Forest and the Santa Fe National Forest, New Mexico, to the village of El Rito and the town of Jemez Springs, New Mexico	Pub. L. 105–224 (text) (PDF)
105-225	August 12, 1998	(No short title)	An Act to revise, codify, and enact without substantive change certain general and permanent laws, related to patriotic and national observances, ceremonies, and organizations, as title 36, United States Code, "Patriotic and National Observances, Ceremonies, and Organizations"	Pub. L. 105–225 (text) (PDF)
105-226	August 12, 1998	John F. Kennedy Center for the Performing Arts Authorization Act of 1998	To amend the John F. Kennedy Center Act to authorize appropriations for the John F. Kennedy Center for the Performing Arts and to further define the criteria for capital repair and operation and maintenance; John F. Kennedy Center for the Performing Arts Authorization Act	Pub. L. 105–226 (text) (PDF)
105-227	August 12, 1998	John F. Kennedy Center for the Performing Arts Authorization Act	An Act to amend the District of Columbia Convention Center and Sports Arena Authorization Act of 1995 to revise the revenues and activities covered under such Act, and for other purposes	Pub. L. 105–227 (text) (PDF)
105-228	August 12, 1998	Emergency Farm Financial Relief Act	An Act to amend the Agricultural Market Transition Act to provide for the advance payment, in full, of the fiscal year 1999 payments otherwise required under production flexibility contracts	Pub. L. 105–228 (text) (PDF)
105-229	August 13, 1998	Shackleford Banks Wild Horses Protection Act	To ensure maintenance of a herd of wild horses in Cape Lookout National Seashore	Pub. L. 105–229 (text) (PDF)
105-230	August 13, 1998	Biomaterials Access Assurance Act of 1998	To establish rules governing product liability actions against raw materials and bulk component suppliers to medical device manufacturers, and for other purposes; Biomaterials Access Assurance Act of 1997	Pub. L. 105–230 (text) (PDF)
105-231	August 13, 1998	Biomaterials Access Assurance Act of 1997	An Act to grant a Federal charter to the American GI Forum of the United States	Pub. L. 105–231 (text) (PDF)
105-232	August 13, 1998	(No short title)	An Act to designate the Federal building and United States courthouse located at 85 Marconi Boulevard in Columbus, Ohio, as the "Joseph P. Kinneary United States Courthouse"	Pub. L. 105–232 (text) (PDF)
105-233	August 13, 1998	(No short title)	An Act to amend chapter 45 of title 28, United States Code, to authorize the Administrative Assistant to the Chief Justice to accept voluntary services, and for other purposes	Pub. L. 105–233 (text) (PDF)
105-234	August 14, 1998	(No short title)	Amending the Fastener Quality Act to exempt from its coverage certain fasteners approved by the Federal Aviation Administration for use in aircraft	Pub. L. 105–234 (text) (PDF)
105-235	August 14, 1998	(No short title)	Joint resolution finding the Government of Iraq in unacceptable and material breach of its international obligations	Pub. L. 105–235 (text) (PDF)
105-236	September 20, 1998	Texas Low-Level Radioactive Waste Disposal Compact Consent Act	To grant the consent of the Congress to the Texas Low-Level Radioactive Waste Disposal Compact	Pub. L. 105–236 (text) (PDF)
105-237	September 20, 1998	Military Construction Appropriations Act, 1999	Making appropriations for military construction, family housing, and base realignment and closure for the Department of Defense for the fiscal year ending September 30, 1999, and for other purposes	Pub. L. 105–237 (text) (PDF)
105-238	September 23, 1998	(No short title)	An Act to transfer administrative jurisdiction over part of the Lake Chelan National Recreation Area from the Secretary of the Interior to the Secretary of Agriculture for inclusion in the Wenatchee National Forest	Pub. L. 105–238 (text) (PDF)
105-239	September 23, 1998	Marion National Fish Hatchery and Claude Harris National Aquacultural Research Center Conveyance Act	An Act to direct the Secretary of the Interior to convey the Marion National Fish Hatchery and the Claude Harris National Aquacultural Research Center to the State of Alabama, and for other purposes	Pub. L. 105–239 (text) (PDF)
105-240	September 25, 1998	Continuing Appropriation FY99 (First)	Making continuing appropriations for the fiscal year 1999, and for other purposes	Pub. L. 105–240 (text) (PDF)
105-241	September 28, 1998	Postal Employees Safety Enhancement Act	An Act to make the Occupational Safety and Health Act of 1970 applicable to the United States Postal Service in the same manner as any other employer	Pub. L. 105–241 (text) (PDF)
105-242	October 5, 1998	National Wildlife Refuge System Volunteer and Community Partnership Enhancement Act of 1998	An Act to amend the Fish and Wildlife Act of 1956 to promote volunteer programs and community partnerships for the benefit of national wildlife refuges, and for other purposes; To amend the Fish and Wildlife Act of 1956 to direct the Secretary of the Interior to conduct a volunteer pilot project at one national wildlife refuge in each United States Fish and Wildlife Service region, and for other purposes; National Wildlife Refuge System Volunteer and Community Partnership Act of 1997; National Wildlife Refuge System Volunteer and Partnership Enhancement Act of 1998; Volunteers for Wildlife Act of 1997	Pub. L. 105–242 (text) (PDF)
105-243	October 6, 1998	Sand Creek Massacre National Historic Site Preservation Act of 1998	An Act to authorize the Secretary of the Interior to study the suitability and feasibility of designating the Sand Creek Massacre National Historic Site in the State of Colorado as a unit of the National Park System, and for other purposes; An Act to establish the Sand Creek Massacre National Historic Site in the State of Colorado; Sand Creek Massacre National Historic Site Study Act of 1998	Pub. L. 105–243 (text) (PDF)
105-244	October 7, 1998	Higher Education Amendments of 1998	To extend the authorization of programs under the Higher Education Act of 1965, and for other purposes; Community Scholarship Mobilization Act; Education of the Deaf Amendments of 1998; Jeanne Clery Disclosure of Campus Security Policy and Campus Crime Statistics Act; Web-Based Education Commission Act	Pub. L. 105–244 (text) (PDF)
105-245	October 7, 1998	Energy and Water Development Appropriations Act, 1999	Making appropriations for energy and water development for the fiscal year ending September 30, 1999, and for other purposes; Denali Commission Act of 1998	Pub. L. 105–245 (text) (PDF)
105-246	October 8, 1998	Nazi War Crimes Disclosure Act	An Act to amend section 552 of title 5, United States Code, and the National Security Act of 1947 to require disclosure under the Freedom of Information Act regarding certain persons, disclose Nazi war criminal records without impairing any investigation or prosecution conducted by the Department of Justice or certain intelligence matters, and for other purposes	Pub. L. 105–246 (text) (PDF)
105-247	October 9, 1998	(No short title)	An Act to correct a provision relating to termination of benefits for convicted persons	Pub. L. 105–247 (text) (PDF)
105-248	October 9, 1998	Mammography Quality Standards Reauthorization Act of 1998	To amend the Public Health Service Act to revise and extend the program for mammography quality standards	Pub. L. 105–248 (text) (PDF)
105-249	October 9, 1998	Continuing Appropriation FY99 (Second)	Making further continuing appropriations for the fiscal year 1999, and for other purposes	Pub. L. 105–249 (text) (PDF)
105-250	October 9, 1998	(No short title)	An Act to designate the United States courthouse located at 141 Church Street in New Haven, Connecticut, as the "Richard C. Lee United States Courthouse"	Pub. L. 105–250 (text) (PDF)
105-251	October 9, 1998	Crime Identification Technology Act of 1998	An Act to provide for the improvement of interstate criminal justice identification, information, communications, and forensics; National Crime Prevention and Privacy Compact Act of 1998; National Criminal History Access and Child Protection Act; Volunteers for Children Act	Pub. L. 105–251 (text) (PDF)
105-252	October 9, 1998	(No short title)	An Act to extend a quarterly financial report program administered by the Secretary of Commerce	Pub. L. 105–252 (text) (PDF)
105-253	October 12, 1998	(No short title)	Waiving certain enrollment requirements for the remainder of the One Hundred Fifth Congress with respect to any bill or joint resolution making general or continuing appropriations for fiscal year 1999	Pub. L. 105–253 (text) (PDF)
105-254	October 12, 1998	Continuing Appropriation FY99 (Third)	Making further continuing appropriations for the fiscal year 1999, and for other purposes	Pub. L. 105–254 (text) (PDF)
105-255	October 14, 1998	Commission on the Advancement of Women and Minorities in Science, Engineering, and Technology Development Act	To establish the Commission on the Advancement of Women in Science, Engineering, and Technology Development; Commission on the Advancement of Women in Science, Engineering, and Technology Development Act	Pub. L. 105–255 (text) (PDF)
105-256	October 14, 1998	(No short title)	An Act to make certain technical corrections in laws relating to Native Americans, and for other purposes	Pub. L. 105–256 (text) (PDF)
105-257	October 14, 1998	Continuing Appropriation FY99 (Fourth)	Making further continuing appropriations for the fiscal year 1999, and for other purposes	Pub. L. 105–257 (text) (PDF)
105-258	October 14, 1998	Ocean Shipping Reform Act of 1998	An Act to amend the Shipping Act of 1984 to encourage competition in international shipping and growth of United States exports, and for other purposes; Ocean Shipping Reform Act of 1997	Pub. L. 105–258 (text) (PDF)
105-259	October 15, 1998	(No short title)	An Act to extend the date by which an automated entry-exit control system must be developed	Pub. L. 105–259 (text) (PDF)
105-260	October 16, 1998	Continuing Appropriation FY99 (Fifth)	Making further continuing appropriations for the fiscal year 1999, and for other purposes	Pub. L. 105–260 (text) (PDF)
105-261	October 17, 1998	Strom Thurmond National Defense Authorization Act for Fiscal Year 1999	To authorize appropriations for fiscal year 1999 for military activities of the Department of Defense, to prescribe military personnel strengths for fiscal year 1999, and for other purposes; Defense Against Weapons of Mass Destruction Act of 1998; Defense Commercial Pricing Management Improvement Act of 1998; Fair Trade in Automotive Parts Act of 1998; Juniper Butte Range Withdrawal Act; Military Construction Authorization Act for Fiscal Year 1999; National Defense Authorization Act for Fiscal Year 1999; Panama Canal Commission Authorization Act for Fiscal Year 1999; Radio Free Asia Act of 1998	Pub. L. 105–261 (text) (PDF)
105-262	October 17, 1998	Department of Defense Appropriations Act, 1999	Making appropriations for the Department of Defense for the fiscal year ending September 30, 1999, and for other purposes; Forced Abortion Condemnation Act; Political Freedom in China Act of 1998	Pub. L. 105–262 (text) (PDF)
105-263	October 19, 1998	Southern Nevada Public Land Management Act of 1998	To provide for the orderly disposal of certain Federal lands in Clark County, Nevada, and to provide for the acquisition of environmentally sensitive lands in the State of Nevada; Southern Nevada Public Land Management Act of 1997	Pub. L. 105–263 (text) (PDF)
105-264	October 19, 1998	Travel and Transportation Reform Act of 1998	To require Federal employees to use Federal travel charge cards for all payments of expenses of official Government travel, to amend title 31, United States Code, to establish requirements for prepayment audits of Federal agency transportation expenses, to authorize reimbursement of Federal agency employees for taxes incurred on travel or transportation reimbursements, and to authorize test programs for the payment of Federal employee travel expenses and relocation expenses; Travel and Transportation Reform Act of 1997	Pub. L. 105–264 (text) (PDF)
105-265	October 19, 1998	Great Lakes Fish and Wildlife Restoration Act of 1998	To amend the Great Lakes Fish and Wildlife Restoration Act of 1990 to provide for implementation of recommendations of the United States Fish and Wildlife Service contained in the Great Lakes Fishery Restoration Study Report; Great Lakes Fish and Wildlife Restoration Act of 1997	Pub. L. 105–265 (text) (PDF)
105-266	October 19, 1998	Federal Employees Health Care Protection Act of 1998	To amend chapter 89 of title 5, United States Code, to improve administration of sanctions against unfit health care providers under the Federal Employees Health Benefits Program, and for other purposes; Federal Employees Health Care Protection Act of 1997	Pub. L. 105–266 (text) (PDF)
105-267	October 19, 1998	Gallatin Land Consolidation Act of 1998	To direct the Secretary of Agriculture and the Secretary of the Interior to exchange land and other assets with Big Sky Lumber Co	Pub. L. 105–267 (text) (PDF)
105-268	October 19, 1998	Library of Congress Bicentennial Commemorative Coin Act of 1998	To require the Secretary of the Treasury to mint coins in commemoration of the bicentennial of the Library of Congress	Pub. L. 105–268 (text) (PDF)
105-269	October 19, 1998	Migratory Bird Hunting and Conservation Stamp Promotion Act	To authorize the use of receipts from the sale of the Migratory Bird Hunting and Conservation Stamps to promote additional stamp purchases	Pub. L. 105–269 (text) (PDF)
105-270	October 19, 1998	Federal Activities Inventory Reform Act of 1998	An Act to require that the Federal Government procure from the private sector the goods and services necessary for the operations and management of certain Government agencies, and for other purposes; An Act to provide a process for identifying the functions of the Federal Government that are not inherently governmental functions, and for other purposes; Freedom From Government Competition Act of 1997	Pub. L. 105–270 (text) (PDF)
105-271	October 19, 1998	Year 2000 Information and Readiness Disclosure Act	An Act to encourage the disclosure and exchange of information about computer processing problems and related matters in connection with the transition to the Year 2000; An Act to encourage the disclosure and exchange of information about computer processing problems, solutions, test practices and test results, and related matters in connection with the transition to the year 2000; Year 2000 Information Disclosure Act	Pub. L. 105–271 (text) (PDF)
105-272	October 20, 1998	Intelligence Authorization Act for Fiscal Year 1999	To authorize appropriations for fiscal year 1999 for intelligence and intelligence-related activities of the United States Government, the Community Management Account, and the Central Intelligence Agency Retirement and Disability System, and for other purposes; Intelligence Community Whistleblower Protection Act of 1998	Pub. L. 105–272 (text) (PDF)
105-273	October 20, 1998	Continuing Appropriation FY99 (Sixth)	Making further continuing appropriations for the fiscal year 1999, and for other purposes	Pub. L. 105–273 (text) (PDF)
105-274	October 21, 1998	District of Columbia Courts and Justice Technical Corrections Act of 1998	To make technical and clarifying amendments to the National Capital Revitalization and Self-Government Improvement Act of 1997	Pub. L. 105–274 (text) (PDF)
105-275	October 21, 1998	Legislative Branch Appropriations Act, 1999	Making appropriations for the Legislative Branch for the fiscal year ending September 30, 1999, and for other purposes; Congressional Operations Appropriations Act, 1999; Trade Deficit Review Commission Act	Pub. L. 105–275 (text) (PDF)
105-276	October 21, 1998	Departments of Veterans Affairs and Housing and Urban Development, and Independent Agencies Appropriations Act, 1999	Making appropriations for the Departments of Veterans Affairs and Housing and Urban Development, and for sundry independent agencies, boards, commissions, corporations, and offices for the fiscal year ending September 30, 1999, and for other purposes; Community Partnerships Against Crime Act of 1998; Housing Opportunity and Responsibility Act of 1998; Public and Assisted Housing Drug Elimination Program Amendments of 1998; Quality Housing and Work Responsibility Act of 1998	Pub. L. 105–276 (text) (PDF)
105-277	October 21, 1998	Omnibus Consolidated and Emergency Supplemental Appropriations Act, 1999	Making appropriations for the Department of Transportation and related agencies for the fiscal year ending September 30, 1999, and for other purposes; Making omnibus consolidated and emergency appropriations for the fiscal; year ending September 30, 1999, and for other purposes; Agriculture, Rural Development, Food and Drug Administration, and Related Agencies Appropriations Act, 1999; American Competitiveness and Workforce Improvement Act of 1998; American Fisheries Act; Canyon Ferry Reservoir, Montana Act; Chemical Weapons Convention Implementation Act of 1998; Child Online Protection Act; Children's Online Privacy Protection Act of 1998; Controlled Substances Trafficking Prohibition Act; Denali Commission Act of 1998; Department of Commerce and Related Agencies Appropriations Act, 1999; Department of Education Appropriations Act, 1999; Department of Health and Human Services Appropriations Act, 1999; Department of Labor Appropriations Act, 1999; Department of State and Related Agencies Appropriations Act, 1999; Department of Transportation and Related Agencies Appropriations Act, 1999; Department of Transportation and Related Agencies Appropriations Act, 1999; Department of the Interior and Related Agencies Appropriations Act, 1999; Departments of Commerce, Justice, and State, the Judiciary and Related Agencies Appropriations Act, 1999; District of Columbia Adoption Improvement Act of 1998; District of Columbia Appropriations Act, 1998; Drug Demand Reduction Act; Drug-Free Media Campaign Act of 1998; Drug-Free Prisons and Jails Act of 1998; Drug-Free Schools Quality Assurance Act; Drug-Free Workplace Act of 1998; European Security Act of 1998; Executive Office Appropriations Act, 1999; Federal Vacancies Reform Act of 1998; Foreign Affairs Agencies Consolidation Act of 1998; Foreign Affairs Reform and Restructuring Act of 1998; Foreign Operations, Export Financing, and Related Programs Appropriations Act, 1999; Foreign Relations Authorization Act, Fiscal Years 1998 and 1999; Government Paperwork Elimination Act; Haitian Refugee Immigration Fairness Act of 1998; Herger-Feinstein Quincy Library Group Forest Recovery Act; Independent Agencies Appropriations Act, 1999; India-Pakistan Relief Act of 1998; Indian Tribal Tort Claims and Risk Management Act of 1998; Internet Tax Freedom Act; Interstate 90 Land Exchange Act of 1998; Judiciary Appropriations Act, 1999; Land Between the Lakes Protection Act of 1998; Lorton Technical Corrections Act of 1998; Methamphetamine Trafficking Penalty Enhancement Act of 1998; McDade Amendment; National Whale Conservation Fund Act of 1998; Office of National Drug Control Policy Reauthorization Act of 1998; Olympic and Amateur Sports Act Amendments of 1998; Persian Gulf War Veterans Act of 1998; Postal Service Appropriations Act, 1999; Treasury Department Appropriations Act, 1999; Treasury and General Government Appropriations Act, 1999; Vaccine Injury Compensation Program Modification Act; Western Hemisphere Drug Elimination Act	Pub. L. 105–277 (text) (PDF)
105-278	October 22, 1998	Charter School Expansion Act of 1998	To amend titles VI and X of the Elementary and Secondary Education Act of 1965 to improve and expand charter schools; Charter Schools Amendments Act of 1997; Community-Designed Charter Schools Act	Pub. L. 105–278 (text) (PDF)
105-279	October 23, 1998	Mount St. Helens National Volcanic Monument Completion Act	To provide for the expeditious completion of the acquisition of private mineral interests within the Mount St. Helens National Volcanic Monument mandated by the 1982 Act that established the Monument, and for other purposes	Pub. L. 105–279 (text) (PDF)
105-280	October 26, 1998	(No short title)	An Act to provide for a land exchange involving the Cape Cod National Seashore and to extend the authority for the Cape Cod National Seashore Advisory Commission	Pub. L. 105–280 (text) (PDF)
105-281	October 26, 1998	Granite Watershed Enhancement and Protection Act of 1998	To provide for a demonstration project in the Stanislaus National Forest, California, under which a private contractor will perform multiple resource management activities for that unit of the National Forest System; Granite Watershed Enhancement and Protection Act of 1997	Pub. L. 105–281 (text) (PDF)
105-282	October 26, 1998	(No short title)	An Act to authorize the Secretary of Agriculture to convey the administrative site for the Rogue River National Forest and use the proceeds for the construction or improvement of offices and support buildings for the Rogue River National Forest and the Bureau of Land Management	Pub. L. 105–282 (text) (PDF)
105-283	October 26, 1998	(No short title)	An Act to extend the deadline under the Federal Power Act applicable to the construction of a hydroelectric project in the State of Arkansas	Pub. L. 105–283 (text) (PDF)
105-284	October 26, 1998	(No short title)	An Act to authorize the Government of India to establish a memorial to honor Mahatma Gandhi in the District of Columbia	Pub. L. 105–284 (text) (PDF)
105-285	October 27, 1998	Coats Human Services Reauthorization Act of 1998	An Act to amend the Head Start Act, the Low-Income Home Energy Assistance Act of 1981, and the Community Services Block Grant Act to reauthorize and make improvements to those Acts, to establish demonstration projects that provide an opportunity for persons with limited means to accumulate assets, and for other purposes; Assets for Independence Act; Community Opportunities, Accountability, and Training and Educational Services Act of 1998; Community Services Authorization Act of 1998; Head Start Amendments Act of 1998; Head Start Amendments of 1998; Human Services Reauthorization Act of 1998; Low-Income Home Energy Assistance Amendments of 1998	Pub. L. 105–285 (text) (PDF)
105-286	October 27, 1998	Border Smog Reduction Act of 1998	To amend the Clean Air Act to deny entry into the United States of certain foreign motor vehicles that do not comply with State laws governing motor vehicles emissions, and for other purposes; Border Smog Reduction Act of 1997	Pub. L. 105–286 (text) (PDF)
105-287	October 27, 1998	Armored Car Reciprocity Amendments of 1998	To amend the Armored Car Industry Reciprocity Act of 1993 to clarify certain requirements and to improve the flow of interstate commerce; Armored Car Reciprocity Amendments of 1997	Pub. L. 105–287 (text) (PDF)
105-288	October 27, 1998	Miles Land Exchange Act of 1998	To provide for a land exchange involving certain National Forest System lands within the Routt National Forest in the State of Colorado; Miles Land Exchange Act of 1997	Pub. L. 105–288 (text) (PDF)
105-289	October 27, 1998	Plant Patent Amendment Act of 1998	To amend title 35, United States Code, to protect patent owners against the unauthorized sale of plant parts taken from plants illegally reproduced, and for other purposes; Plant Patent Amendments Act of 1997; Plant Patent Amendments Act of 1998	Pub. L. 105–289 (text) (PDF)
105-290	October 27, 1998	(No short title)	An Act to authorize the Secretary of the Interior to provide assistance to the National Historic Trails Interpretive Center in Casper, Wyoming	Pub. L. 105–290 (text) (PDF)
105-291	October 27, 1998	Guam Organic Act Amendments of 1998	To amend the Organic Act of Guam for the purposes of clarifying the local judicial structure and the office of Attorney General; Guam Judicial Empowerment Act of 1997	Pub. L. 105–291 (text) (PDF)
105-292	October 27, 1998	International Religious Freedom Act of 1998	An Act to express United States foreign policy with respect to, and to strengthen United States advocacy on behalf of, individuals persecuted in foreign countries on account of religion; to authorize United States actions in response to violations of religious freedom in foreign countries; to establish an Ambassador at Large for International Religious Freedom within the Department of State, a Commission on International Religious Freedom, and a Special Advisor on International Religious Freedom within the National Security Council; and for other purposes; To establish an Office of Religious Persecution Monitoring, to provide for the imposition of sanctions against countries engaged in a pattern of religious persecution, and for other purposes; Freedom From Religious Persecution Act of 1997; Freedom From Religious Persecution Act of 1998	Pub. L. 105–292 (text) (PDF)
105-293	October 27, 1998	Irrigation Project Contract Extension Act of 1998	To extend certain contracts between the Bureau of Reclamation and irrigation water contractors in Wyoming and Nebraska that receive water from Glendo Reservoir; Irrigation Project Contract Extension Act of 1997	Pub. L. 105–293 (text) (PDF)
105-294	October 27, 1998	Advisory Council on California Indian Policy Extension Act of 1998	To extend the Advisory Council on California Indian Policy to allow the Advisory Council to advise Congress on the implementation of the proposals and recommendations of the Advisory Council; Advisory Council on California Indian Policy Extension Act of 1997	Pub. L. 105–294 (text) (PDF)
105-295	October 27, 1998	(No short title)	An Act to authorize the construction of temperature control devices at Folsom Dam in California	Pub. L. 105–295 (text) (PDF)
105-296	October 27, 1998	(No short title)	An Act to amend the Idaho Admission Act regarding the sale or lease of school land	Pub. L. 105–296 (text) (PDF)
105-297	October 27, 1998	Curt Flood Act of 1998	An Act to require the general application of the antitrust laws to major league baseball, and for other purposes; Curt Flood Act of 1997	Pub. L. 105–297 (text) (PDF)
105-298	October 27, 1998	Sonny Bono Copyright Term Extension Act	An Act to amend the provisions of title 17, United States Code, with respect to the duration of copyright, and for other purposes; Copyright Term Extension Act of 1997; Fairness in Music Licensing Act of 1998	Pub. L. 105–298 (text) (PDF)
105-299	October 27, 1998	(No short title)	An Act to designate a Federal building located in Florence, Alabama, as the "Justice John McKinley Federal Building"	Pub. L. 105–299 (text) (PDF)
105-300	October 27, 1998	(No short title)	An Act to provide that a person closely related to a judge of a court exercising judicial power under article III of the United States Constitution (other than the Supreme Court) may not be appointed as a judge of the same court, and for other purposes	Pub. L. 105–300 (text) (PDF)
105-301	October 27, 1998	Crime Victims With Disabilities Awareness Act	An Act to increase public awareness of the plight of victims of crime with developmental disabilities, to collect data to measure the magnitude of the problem, and to develop strategies to address the safety and justice needs of victims of crime with developmental disabilities	Pub. L. 105–301 (text) (PDF)
105-302	October 27, 1998	(No short title)	An Act to amend part Q of the Omnibus Crime Control and Safe Streets Act of 1968 to encourage the use of school resource officers	Pub. L. 105–302 (text) (PDF)
105-303	October 28, 1998	Commercial Space Act of 1998	To encourage the development of a commercial space industry in the United States, and for other purposes; Commercial Space Act of 1997	Pub. L. 105–303 (text) (PDF)
105-304	October 28, 1998	Digital Millennium Copyright Act	To amend title 17, United States Code, to implement the World Intellectual Property Organization Copyright Treaty and Performances and Phonograms Treaty; Collections of Information Antipiracy Act; Computer Maintenance Competition Assurance Act; Digital Millennium Copyright Act of 1998; Internet Copyright Infringement Liability Clarification Act of 1998; On-Line Copyright Infringement Liability Limitation Act; Online Copyright Infringement Liability Limitation Act; WIPO Copyright Treaties Implementation Act; WIPO Copyright and Performance and Phonograms Treaties Implementation Act of 1998; WIPO Copyright and Performances and Phonograms Treaties Implementation Act of 1998	Pub. L. 105–304 (text) (PDF)
105-305	October 28, 1998	Next Generation Internet Research Act of 1998	To amend the High Performance Computing Act of 1991 to authorize appropriations for fiscal years 1999 and 2000 for the Next Generation Internet program, to require the Advisory Committee on High-Performance Computing and Communications, Information Technology, and the Next Generation Internet to monitor and give advice concerning the development and implementation of the Next Generation Internet program and report to the President and the Congress on its activities, and for other purposes	Pub. L. 105–305 (text) (PDF)
105-306	October 28, 1998	Noncitizen Benefit Clarification and Other Technical Amendments Act of 1998	To make technical amendments to clarify the provision of benefits for noncitizens, and to improve the provision of unemployment insurance, child support, and supplemental security income benefits; Noncitizen Benefit Clarification and Other Technical Amendments Act of 1998	Pub. L. 105–306 (text) (PDF)
105-307	October 29, 1998	Dante Fascell Biscayne National Park Visitor Center Designation Act	An Act to designate the Biscayne National Park Visitor Center as the Dante Fascell Visitor Center	Pub. L. 105–307 (text) (PDF)
105-308	October 30, 1998	(No short title)	An Act to remove the restriction on the distribution of certain revenues from the Mineral Springs parcel to certain members of the Agua Caliente Band of Cahuilla Indians	Pub. L. 105–308 (text) (PDF)
105-309	October 30, 1998	Technology Administration Act of 1998	To authorize appropriations for the National Institute of Standards and Technology for fiscal years 1998 and 1999, and for other purposes; National Institute of Standards and Technology Authorization Act of 1997	Pub. L. 105–309 (text) (PDF)
105-310	October 30, 1998	Money Laundering and Financial Crimes Strategy Act of 1998	To amend chapter 53 of title 31, United States Code, to require the development and implementation by the Secretary of the Treasury of a national money laundering and related financial crimes strategy to combat money laundering and related financial crimes, and for other purposes; Money Laundering and Financial Crimes Strategy Act of 1997	Pub. L. 105–310 (text) (PDF)
105-311	October 30, 1998	Federal Employees Life Insurance Improvement Act	An Act to provide for the Office of Personnel Management to conduct a study and submit a report to Congress on the provision of certain options for universal life insurance coverage and additional death and dismemberment insurance under chapter 87 of title 5, United States Code, to improve the administration of such chapter, and for other purposes; To require that the Office of Personnel Management submit proposed legislation under which group universal life insurance and group variable universal life insurance would be available under chapter 87 of title 5, United States Code, and for other purposes	Pub. L. 105–311 (text) (PDF)
105-312	October 30, 1998	Migratory Bird Treaty Reform Act of 1998	An Act to clarify restrictions under the Migratory Bird Treaty Act on baiting and to facilitate acquisitions of migratory bird habitat, and for other purposes; To amend the Rhinoceros and Tiger Conservation Act of 1994 to prohibit the sale, importation, and exportation of products labeled as containing substances derived from rhinoceros or tiger; Chesapeake Bay Initiative Act of 1998; Chesapeake Bay Initiative Act of 1998; Chesapeake Bay Initiatives Act of 1998; National Wildlife Refuge System Improvement Act of 1998; Rhino and Tiger Product Labeling Act; Rhinoceros and Tiger Conservation Act of 1998; Wetlands and Wildlife Enhancement Act of 1998	Pub. L. 105–312 (text) (PDF)
105-313	October 30, 1998	Miccosukee Reserved Area Act	To deem the activities of the Miccosukee Tribe on the Tamiami Indian Reservation to be consistent with the purposes of the Everglades National Park, and for other purposes	Pub. L. 105–313 (text) (PDF)
105-314	October 30, 1998	Protection of Children From Sexual Predators Act of 1998	An Act to amend title 18, United States Code, to protect children from sexual abusae and exploitation, and for other purposes; To amend title 18, United States Code, with respect to violent sex crimes against children, and for other purposes; Child Protection and Sexual Predator Punishment Act of 1998; Prevention of Custodial Sexual Assault by Correctional Staff Act; Standards, Practice, and Training for Sexual Assault Examinations Act; Violence Against Women Training for Health Professions Act; Volunteers for Children Act	Pub. L. 105–314 (text) (PDF)
105-315	October 30, 1998	Alternative Dispute Resolution Act of 1998	To amend title 28, United States Code, with respect to the use of alternative dispute resolution processes in United States district courts, and for other purposes	Pub. L. 105–315 (text) (PDF)
105-316	October 30, 1998	Canadian River Project Prepayment Act	To authorize prepayment of amounts due under a water reclamation project contract for the Canadian River Project, Texas	Pub. L. 105–316 (text) (PDF)
105-317	October 30, 1998	Glacier Bay National Park Boundary Adjustment Act of 1998	To provide for an exchange of lands located near Gustavus, Alaska, and for other purposes	Pub. L. 105–317 (text) (PDF)
105-318	October 30, 1998	Identity Theft and Assumption Deterrence Act of 1998	To amend chapter 47 of title 18, United States Code, relating to identity fraud, and for other purposes	Pub. L. 105–318 (text) (PDF)
105-319	October 30, 1998	Irish Peace Process Cultural and Training Program Act of 1998	To establish a cultural and training program for disadvantaged individuals from Northern Ireland and the Republic of Ireland	Pub. L. 105–319 (text) (PDF)
105-320	October 30, 1998	Torture Victims Relief Act of 1998	To provide a comprehensive program of support for victims of torture	Pub. L. 105–320 (text) (PDF)
105-321	October 30, 1998	Oregon Public Lands Transfer and Protection Act of 1998	To transfer administrative jurisdiction over certain Federal lands located within or adjacent to the Rogue River National Forest and to clarify the authority of the Bureau of Land Management to sell and exchange other Federal lands in Oregon	Pub. L. 105–321 (text) (PDF)
105-322	October 30, 1998	(No short title)	An Act to authorize the Secretary of the Interior to provide financial assistance to the State of Maryland for a pilot program to develop measures to eradicate or control nutria and restore marshland damaged by nutria	Pub. L. 105–322 (text) (PDF)
105-323	October 30, 1998	Extradition Treaties Interpretation Act of 1998	To amend the State Department Basic Authorities Act of 1956 to provide rewards for information leading to the arrest or conviction of any individual for the commission of an act, or conspiracy to act, of international terrorism, narcotics related offenses, or for serious violations of international humanitarian law relating to the Former Yugoslavia	Pub. L. 105–323 (text) (PDF)
105-324	October 30, 1998	Antimicrobial Regulation Technical Corrections Act of 1998	To amend the Federal Food, Drug, and Cosmetic Act to clarify the circumstances in which a substance is considered to be a pesticide chemical for purposes of such Act, and for other purposes	Pub. L. 105–324 (text) (PDF)
105-325	October 30, 1998	National Cave and Karst Research Institute Act of 1998	An Act to establish the National Cave and Karst Research Institute in the State of New Mexico, and for other purposes; National Cave and Karst Research Institute Act of 1997	Pub. L. 105–325 (text) (PDF)
105-326	October 30, 1998	Dutch John Federal Property Disposition and Assistance Act of 1998	An Act to dispose of certain Federal properties located in Dutch John, Utah, to assist the local government in the interim delivery of basic services to the Dutch John community, and for other purposes; Dutch John Federal Property Disposition and Assistance Act of 1997	Pub. L. 105–326 (text) (PDF)
105-327	October 30, 1998	(No short title)	An Act to amend the Land and Water Conservation Fund Act of 1965 to allow national park units that cannot charge an entrance or admission fee to retain other fees and charges	Pub. L. 105–327 (text) (PDF)
105-328	October 30, 1998	Fish and Wildlife Revenue Enhancement Act of 1998	An Act to amend the Fish and Wildlife Improvement Act of 1978 to enable the Secretary of the Interior to more effectively use the proceeds of sales of certain items	Pub. L. 105–328 (text) (PDF)
105-329	October 30, 1998	Arches National Park Expansion Act of 1998	An Act to expand the boundaries of Arches National Park, Utah, to include portions of certain drainages that are under the jurisdiction of the Bureau of Land Management, and to include a portion of Fish Seep Draw owned by the State of Utah, and for other purposes	Pub. L. 105–329 (text) (PDF)
105-330	October 30, 1998	Trademark Law Treaty Implementation Act	An Act to implement the provisions of the Trademark Law Treaty	Pub. L. 105–330 (text) (PDF)
105-331	October 31, 1998	Thomas Alva Edison Commemorative Coin Act	To require the Secretary of the Treasury to mint coins in commemoration of the sesquicentennial of the birth of Thomas Alva Edison, to redesign the half dollar circulating coin for 1997 to commemorate Thomas Edison, and for other purposes; Thomas Alva Edison Sesquicentennial Commemorative Coin Act	Pub. L. 105–331 (text) (PDF)
105-332	October 31, 1998	Carl D. Perkins Vocational and Applied Technology Education Amendments of 1998	To amend the Carl D. Perkins Vocational and Applied Technology Education Act; Carl D. Perkins Vocational and Applied Technology Education Act of 1998; Carl D. Perkins Vocational-Technical Education Act Amendments of 1997; Tech-Prep Education Act	Pub. L. 105–332 (text) (PDF)
105-333	October 31, 1998	ANCSA Land Bank Protection Act of 1998	To amend the Alaska Native Claims Settlement Act to make certain clarifications to the land bank protection provisions, and for other purposes	Pub. L. 105–333 (text) (PDF)
105-334	October 31, 1998	Drive for Teen Employment Act	To provide for a change in the exemption from the child labor provisions of the Fair Labor Standards Act of 1938 for minors between 16 and 18 years of age who engage in the operation of automobiles and trucks	Pub. L. 105–334 (text) (PDF)
105-335	October 31, 1998	Utah Schools and Lands Exchange Act of 1998	To provide for the exchange of certain lands within the State of Utah	Pub. L. 105–335 (text) (PDF)
105-336	October 31, 1998	William F. Goodling Child Nutrition Reauthorization Act of 1998	To amend the Child Nutrition Act of 1966 to make improvements to the special supplemental nutrition program for women, infants, and children and to extend the authority of that program through fiscal year 2003; Child Nutrition and WIC Reauthorization Amendments of 1998; WIC Reauthorization Amendments of 1998	Pub. L. 105–336 (text) (PDF)
105-337	October 31, 1998	Haskell Indian Nations University and Southwestern Indian PolytechnicInstitute Administrative Systems Act of 1998	To allow Haskell Indian Nations University and the Southwestern Indian Polytechnic Institute each to conduct a demonstration project to test the feasibility and desirability of new personnel management policies and procedures, and for other purposes; Haskell Indian Nations University and Southwestern Indian Polytechnic Institute Administrative Systems Act of 1998	Pub. L. 105–337 (text) (PDF)
105-338	October 31, 1998	Iraq Liberation Act of 1998	To establish a program to support a transition to democracy in Iraq	Pub. L. 105–338 (text) (PDF)
105-339	October 31, 1998	Veterans Employment Opportunities Act of 1998	An Act to amend title 5, United States Code, to provide that consideration may not be denied to preference eligibles applying for certain positions in the competitive service, and for other purposes; Veterans Employment Opportunities Act of 1997	Pub. L. 105–339 (text) (PDF)
105-340	October 31, 1998	Women's Health Research and Prevention Amendments of 1998	An Act to amend the Public Health Service Act to revise and extend certain programs with respect to women's health research and prevention activities at the National Institutes of Health and the Centers for Disease Control and Prevention	Pub. L. 105–340 (text) (PDF)
105-341	October 31, 1998	Women's Progress Commemoration Act	An Act to establish a commission, in honor of the 150th Anniversary of the Seneca Falls Convention, to further protect sites of importance in the historic efforts to secure equal rights for women	Pub. L. 105–341 (text) (PDF)
105-342	November 2, 1998	Adams National Historical Park Act of 1998	An Act to establish the Adams National Historical Park in the Commonwealth of Massachusetts, and for other purposes	Pub. L. 105–342 (text) (PDF)
105-343	November 2, 1998	(No short title)	An Act to amend the Act which established the Frederick Law Olmsted National Historic Site, in the Commonwealth of Massachusetts, by modifying the boundary and for other purposes	Pub. L. 105–343 (text) (PDF)
105-344	November 2, 1998	(No short title)	An Act prohibiting the conveyance of Woodland Lake Park tract in Apache-Sitgreaves National Forest in the State of Arizona unless the conveyance is made to the town of Pinetop-Lakeside or authorized by Act of Congress	Pub. L. 105–344 (text) (PDF)
105-345	November 2, 1998	(No short title)	An Act to amend the Omnibus Parks and Public Lands Management Act of 1996 to extend the legislative authority for the Black Patriots Foundation to establish a commemorative work	Pub. L. 105–345 (text) (PDF)
105-346	November 2, 1998	(No short title)	An Act to direct the Secretary of the Interior to convey title to the Tunnison Lab Hagerman Field Station in Gooding County, Idaho, to the University of Idaho	Pub. L. 105–346 (text) (PDF)
105-347	November 2, 1998	Consumer Reporting Employment Clarification Act of 1998	An Act to amend the Fair Credit Reporting Act with respect to furnishing and using consumer reports for employment purposes	Pub. L. 105–347 (text) (PDF)
105-348	November 2, 1998	(No short title)	Joint resolution granting the consent of Congress to the Potomac Highlands Airport Authority Compact entered into between the States of Maryland and West Virginia	Pub. L. 105–348 (text) (PDF)
105-349	November 2, 1998	(No short title)	Joint resolution recognizing the accomplishments of Inspector General since their creation in 1978 in preventing and detecting waste, fraud, abuse, and mismanagement, and in promoting economy, efficiency, and effectiveness in the Federal Government	Pub. L. 105–349 (text) (PDF)
105-350	November 3, 1998	(No short title)	Appointing the day for the convening of the first session of the One Hundred Sixth Congress	Pub. L. 105–350 (text) (PDF)
105-351	November 3, 1998	(No short title)	An Act to authorize the Secretary of the Interior to convey certain facilities of the Minidoka project to the Burley Irrigation District, and for other purposes	Pub. L. 105–351 (text) (PDF)
105-352	November 3, 1998	Fall River Water Users District Rural Water System Act of 1998	An Act to authorize the construction of the Fall River Water Users District Rural Water System and authorize financial assistance to the Fall River Water Users District, a non-profit corporation, in the planning and construction of the water supply system, and for other purposes; Fall River Water Users District Rural Water System Act of 1997	Pub. L. 105–352 (text) (PDF)
105-353	November 3, 1998	Securities Litigation Uniform Standards Act of 1998	An Act to amend the Securities Act of 1933 and the Securities Exchange Act of 1934 to limit the conduct of securities class actions under State law, and for other purposes; Securities Litigation Uniform Standards Act of 1997	Pub. L. 105–353 (text) (PDF)
105-354	November 3, 1998	(No short title)	An Act to clarify without substantive change laws related to Patriotic and National Observances, Ceremonies, and Organizations and to improve the United States Code	Pub. L. 105–354 (text) (PDF)
105-355	November 6, 1998	Automobile National Heritage Area Act	To authorize the Automobile National Heritage Area; Automobile National Heritage Area Act of 1998	Pub. L. 105–355 (text) (PDF)
105-356	November 6, 1998	(No short title)	An Act to establish the Little Rock Central High School National Historic Site in the State of Arkansas, and for other purposes	Pub. L. 105–356 (text) (PDF)
105-357	November 10, 1998	Controlled Substances Trafficking Prohibition Act	To amend the Controlled Substances Import and Export Act to place limitations on controlled substances brought into the United States from Mexico	Pub. L. 105–357 (text) (PDF)
105-358	November 10, 1998	United States Patent and Trademark Office Reauthorization Act, Fiscal Year 1999	To authorize funds for the payment of salaries and expenses of the Patent and Trademark Office, and for other purposes	Pub. L. 105–358 (text) (PDF)
105-359	November 10, 1998	(No short title)	An Act to require the Secretary of Agriculture and the Secretary of the Interior to conduct a study to improve the access for persons with disabilities to outdoor recreational opportunities made available to the public	Pub. L. 105–359 (text) (PDF)
105-360	November 10, 1998	(No short title)	An Act to extend into fiscal year 1999 the visa processing period for diversity applicants whose visa processing was suspended during fiscal year 1998 due to embassy bombings	Pub. L. 105–360 (text) (PDF)
105-361	November 10, 1998	Native American Programs Act Amendments of 1998	An Act to amend the Native American Programs Act of 1974 to extend certain authorizations, and for other purposes; Native American Programs Act Amendments of 1997	Pub. L. 105–361 (text) (PDF)
105-362	November 10, 1998	Federal Reports Elimination Act of 1998	An Act to eliminate unnecessary and wasteful Federal reports; Federal Reports Elimination Act of 1997	Pub. L. 105–362 (text) (PDF)
105-363	November 10, 1998	(No short title)	An Act to amend the Weir Farm National Historic Site Establishment Act of 1990 to authorize the acquisition of additional acreage for the historic site to permit the development of visitor and administrative facilities and to authorize the appropriation of additional amounts for the acquisition of real and personal property, and for other purposes	Pub. L. 105–363 (text) (PDF)
105-364	November 10, 1998	(No short title)	An Act to provide for the acquisition of lands formerly occupied by the Franklin D. Roosevelt family at Hyde Park, New York, and for other purposes	Pub. L. 105–364 (text) (PDF)
105-365	November 10, 1998	Grant-Kohrs Ranch National Historic Site Boundary Adjustment Act of 1998	An Act to amend the boundaries of Grant-Kohrs Ranch National Historic Site in the State of Montana	Pub. L. 105–365 (text) (PDF)
105-366	November 10, 1998	International Anti-Bribery and Fair Competition Act of 1998	An original bill to amend the Securities Exchange Act of 1934 and the Foreign Corrupt Practices Act of 1977, to strengthen prohibitions on international bribery and other corrupt practices, and for other purposes; International Anti-Bribery Act of 1998	Pub. L. 105–366 (text) (PDF)
105-367	November 10, 1998	(No short title)	An Act to protect the sanctity of contracts and leases entered into by surface patent holders with respect to coalbed methane gas	Pub. L. 105–367 (text) (PDF)
105-368	November 11, 1998	Veterans Programs Enhancement Act of 1998	To provide a cost-of-living adjustment in rates of compensation paid to veterans with service-connected disabilities, to make various improvements in education, housing, and cemetery programs of the Department of Veterans Affairs, and for other purposes; Department of Veterans Affairs Health Care Personnel Incentive Act of 1998; Veterans Benefits Improvement Act of 1998; Veterans' Compensation Cost-of-Living Adjustment Act of 1998	Pub. L. 105–368 (text) (PDF)
105-369	November 12, 1998	Ricky Ray Hemophilia Relief Fund Act of 1998	To provide for compassionate payments with regard to individuals with blood-clotting disorders, such as hemophilia, who contracted human immunodeficiency virus due to contaminated blood products, and for other purposes; Ricky Ray Hemophilia Relief Fund Act of 1997	Pub. L. 105–369 (text) (PDF)
105-370	November 12, 1998	Correction Officers Health and Safety Act of 1998	To amend title 18, United States Code, to provide for the mandatory testing for serious transmissible diseases of incarcerated persons whose bodily fluids come into contact with corrections personnel and notice to those personnel of the results of the tests, and for other purposes; Correction Officers Health and Safety Act of 1997	Pub. L. 105–370 (text) (PDF)
105-371	November 12, 1998	(No short title)	An Act to authorize and request the President to award the congressional Medal of Honor posthumously to Theodore Roosevelt for his gallant and heroic actions in the attack on San Juan Heights, Cuba, during the Spanish–American War	Pub. L. 105–371 (text) (PDF)
105-372	November 12, 1998	Salton Sea Reclamation Act of 1998	An Act to direct the Secretary of the Interior, acting through the Bureau of Reclamation, to complete a feasibility study relating to the Salton Sea, and for other purposes	Pub. L. 105–372 (text) (PDF)
105-373	November 12, 1998	(No short title)	An Act to make available to the Ukrainian Museum and Archives the USIA television program Window on America	Pub. L. 105–373 (text) (PDF)
105-374	November 12, 1998	(No short title)	An Act to amend title 28, United States Code, with respect to the enforcement of child custody and visitation orders	Pub. L. 105–374 (text) (PDF)
105-375	November 12, 1998	(No short title)	An Act to amend the State Department Basic Authorities Act of 1956 to require the Secretary of State to submit an annual report to Congress concerning diplomatic immunity	Pub. L. 105–375 (text) (PDF)
105-376	November 12, 1998	Bandelier National Monument Administrative Improvement and Watershed Protection Act of 1998	An Act to modify the boundaries of the Bandelier National Monument to include the lands within the headwaters of the Upper Alamo Watershed which drain into the Monument and which are not currently within the jurisdiction of a Federal land management agency, to authorize purchase or donation of those lands, and for other purposes; Bandelier National Monument Administrative Improvement and Watershed Protection Act of 1997	Pub. L. 105–376 (text) (PDF)
105-377	November 12, 1998	(No short title)	An Act granting the consent and approval of Congress to an interstate forest fire protection compact	Pub. L. 105–377 (text) (PDF)
105-378	November 12, 1998	Lower East Side Tenement National Historic Site Act of 1998	An Act to establish the Lower East Side Tenement National Historic Site, and for other purposes; Lower East Side Tenement National Historic Site Act of 1997	Pub. L. 105–378 (text) (PDF)
105-379	November 12, 1998	(No short title)	An Act to amend the Food Stamp Act of 1977 to require food stamp State agencies to take certain actions to ensure that food stamp coupons are not issued for deceased individuals, to require the Secretary of Agriculture to conduct a study of options for the design, development, implementation, and operation of a national database to track participation in Federal means-tested public assistance programs, and for other purposes	Pub. L. 105–379 (text) (PDF)
105-380	November 12, 1998	Hawaii Volcanoes National Park Adjustment Act of 1998	An Act to eliminate restrictions on the acquisition of certain land contiguous to Hawaii Volcanoes National Park	Pub. L. 105–380 (text) (PDF)
105-381	November 12, 1998	(No short title)	Joint resolution granting the consent of Congress to the Pacific Northwest Emergency Management Arrangement	Pub. L. 105–381 (text) (PDF)
105-382	November 13, 1998	Department of State Special Agents Retirement Act of 1998	To amend the Foreign Service Act of 1980 to provide that the annuities of certain special agents and security personnel of the Department of State be computed in the same way as applies generally with respect to Federal law enforcement officers, and for other purposes	Pub. L. 105–382 (text) (PDF)
105-383	November 13, 1998	Coast Guard Authorization Act of 1998	To authorize appropriations for fiscal years 1998 and 1999 for the Coast Guard, and for other purposes; Coast Guard Authorization Act of 1997; Harmful Algal Bloom and Hypoxia Research and Control Act of 1998	Pub. L. 105–383 (text) (PDF)
105-384	November 13, 1998	Northwest Straits Marine Conservation Initiative Act	An Act to approve a governing international fishery agreement between the United States and the Republic of Poland	Pub. L. 105–384 (text) (PDF)
105-385	November 13, 1998	Africa: Seeds of Hope Act of 1998	To support sustainable and broad-based agricultural and rural development in sub-Saharan Africa, and for other purposes; Bill Emerson Humanitarian International Food Security Trust Act of 1998; Bill Emerson Humanitarian Trust Act of 1998	Pub. L. 105–385 (text) (PDF)
105-386	November 13, 1998	(No short title)	An Act to throttle criminal use of guns	Pub. L. 105–386 (text) (PDF)
105-387	November 13, 1998	Mississippi Sioux Tribes Judgment Fund Distribution Act of 1998	An Act to provide for the disposition of certain funds appropriated to pay judgment in favor of the Mississippi Sioux Indians, and for other purposes; Mississippi Sioux Tribes Judgment Fund Distribution Act of 1997	Pub. L. 105–387 (text) (PDF)
105-388	November 13, 1998	Energy Conservation Reauthorization Act of 1998	An Act to extend energy conservation programs under the Energy Policy and Conservation Act through September 30, 2002	Pub. L. 105–388 (text) (PDF)
105-389	November 13, 1998	Centennial of Flight Commemoration Act	An Act to establish a commission to assist in commemoration of the centennial of powered flight and the achievements of the Wright brothers	Pub. L. 105–389 (text) (PDF)
105-390	November 13, 1998	Police, Fire, and Emergency Officers Educational Assistance Act of 1998	An Act to provide financial assistance for higher education to the dependents of Federal, State, and local public safety officers who are killed or permanently and totally disabled as the result of a traumatic injury sustained in the line of duty; Public Safety Officers Educational Assistance Act of 1998	Pub. L. 105–390 (text) (PDF)
105-391	November 13, 1998	National Parks Omnibus Management Act of 1998	An Act to provide for improved management and increased accountability for certain National Park Service programs, and for other purposes; An Act to renew, reform, reinvigorate, and protect the National Park System; National Park Service Concession Management Improvement Act of 1998; National Park Service Concessions Management Improvement Act of 1998; National Park System New Areas Studies Act; Vision 2020 National Parks Restoration Act; Vision 2020 National Parks System Restoration Act	Pub. L. 105–391 (text) (PDF)
105-392	November 13, 1998	Health Professions Education Partnerships Act of 1998	An Act to amend the Public Health Service Act to consolidate and reauthorize health professions and minority and disadvantaged health professions and disadvantaged health education programs, and for other purposes; Fetal Alcohol Syndrome and Fetal Alcohol Effect Prevention and Services Act; Nursing Education and Practice Improvement Act of 1998	Pub. L. 105–392 (text) (PDF)
105-393	November 13, 1998	Economic Development Administration and Appalachian Regional Development Reform Act of 1998	An Act to reauthorize and make reforms to programs authorized by the Public Works and Economic Development Act of 1965; An Act to reauthorize and make reforms to programs authorized by the Public Works and Economic Development Act of 1965 and the Appalachian Regional Development Act of 1965; Appalachian Regional Development Reform Act of 1998; Economic Development Administration Reform Act of 1998	Pub. L. 105–393 (text) (PDF)
105-394	November 13, 1998	Assistive Technology Act of 1998	An Act to support programs of grants to States to address the assistive technology needs of individuals with disabilities, and for other purposes	Pub. L. 105–394 (text) (PDF)

== Private laws ==
Private law number (Linked to Wikisource)	Date of enactment	Official short title	Description	Citation
105-5	November 10, 1998	(No short title)	An act for the relief of Heraclio Tolley	112 Stat. 3665
105-6	November 10, 1998	(No short title)	An act for the relief of Larry Errol Pieterse	112 Stat. 3666
105-7	November 10, 1998	(No short title)	An act for the relief of Mai Hoa "Jasmine" Salehi	112 Stat. 3667
105-8	November 10, 1998	(No short title)	An act for the relief of Mercedes Del Carmen Quiroz Martinez Cruz	112 Stat. 3668
105-9	November 10, 1998	(No short title)	An act for the relief of Nuratu Olarewaju Abeke Kadiri	112 Stat. 3669
105-10	November 10, 1998	(No short title)	An act for the relief of Chong Ho Kwak	112 Stat. 3670

== Treaties ==
No treaties have been enacted this Congress.

== See also ==
- List of United States federal legislation
- List of acts of the 104th United States Congress
- List of acts of the 106th United States Congress
