= Dianzi, Guan County =

Dianzi 店子镇
- Town
- Location in Shandong Dianzi (China)
- Coordinates: 36°34′05″N 115°29′53″E
- Country: People's Republic of China
- Province: Shandong
- Prefecture-level city: Liaocheng
- County: Guan
- Time zone: UTC+8 (China Standard)

Dianzi (Chinese: 店子镇) is a town in Guan County, Liaocheng, in western Shandong province, China.
