= Liulin, Guan County =

Liulin 柳林镇
- Town
- Location in Shandong Liulin (China)
- Coordinates: 36°39′42″N 115°41′11″E
- Country: People's Republic of China
- Province: Shandong
- Prefecture-level city: Liaocheng
- County: Guan
- Time zone: UTC+8 (China Standard)

Liulin (Chinese: 柳林镇) is a town in Guan County, Liaocheng, in western Shandong province, China.
