= Sang'e =

Sang'e 桑阿镇
- Town
- Location in Shandong Sang'e (China)
- Coordinates: 36°26′08″N 115°36′55″E
- Country: People's Republic of China
- Province: Shandong
- Prefecture-level city: Liaocheng
- County: Guan
- Time zone: UTC+8 (China Standard)

Sang'e (Chinese: 桑阿镇) is a town in Guan County, Liaocheng, in western Shandong province, China.
