= Donggucheng =

Donggucheng 东古城镇
- Town
- Location in Shandong Donggucheng (China)
- Coordinates: 36°31′43″N 115°19′11″E
- Country: People's Republic of China
- Province: Shandong
- Prefecture-level city: Liaocheng
- County: Guan
- Time zone: UTC+8 (China Standard)

Donggucheng (Chinese: 东古城镇) is a town in Guan County, Liaocheng, in western Shandong province, China.
