= H.R. 1300 (113th Congress) =

- Long title: To amend the Fish and Wildlife Act of 1956 to reauthorize the volunteer programs and community partnerships for the benefit of national wildlife refuges, and for other purposes.
- Announced in: the 113th United States Congress
- Sponsored by: Rep. Jon Runyan (R, NJ-3)
- Number of co-sponsors: 1

Codification
- Acts affected: Fish and Wildlife Act of 1956
- U.S.C. sections affected: 16 U.S.C. § 742f(g),

Legislative history
- Introduced in the House as H.R. 1300 by Rep. Jon Runyan (R-NJ) on March 20, 2013; Committee consideration by United States House Committee on Natural Resources, United States House Natural Resources Subcommittee on Fisheries, Wildlife, Oceans and Insular Affairs

H.R. 1300 (long title: To amend the Fish and Wildlife Act of 1956 to reauthorize the volunteer programs and community partnerships for the benefit of national wildlife refuges, and for other purpose) is a bill that was introduced into the United States House of Representatives during the 113th United States Congress. The bill would "extend through FY2017 the authorization of appropriations for volunteer services for programs conducted by the United States Fish and Wildlife Service or the National Oceanic and Atmospheric Administration (NOAA), community partnership projects for national wildlife refuges, and refuge education programs." The bill would authorize the appropriation of $6 million between 2015-2017.

== Provisions of the bill ==
This summary is based largely on the summary provided by the Congressional Research Service, a public domain source.

H.R. 1300 would amend the Fish and Wildlife Act of 1956 to extend through FY2017 the authorization of appropriations for volunteer services for programs conducted by the United States Fish and Wildlife Service or the National Oceanic and Atmospheric Administration (NOAA), community partnership projects for national wildlife refuges, and refuge education programs.

== Congressional Budget office report ==
H.R. 1300 would authorize the appropriation of $6 million over the 2015-2017 period for the U.S. Fish and Wildlife Service to carry out volunteer programs and community partnerships at national wildlife refuges. Assuming appropriation of the authorized amounts, the Congressional Budget Office (CBO) estimates that implementing the legislation would cost $6 million over the 2015-2017 period. Enacting H.R. 1300 would not affect direct spending or revenues; therefore, pay-as-you-go procedures do not apply.

== Procedural history ==
H.R. 1300 was introduced into the House on March 20, 2013 by Rep. Jon Runyan (R-NJ). It was referred to the United States House Committee on Natural Resources and the United States House Natural Resources Subcommittee on Fisheries, Wildlife, Oceans and Insular Affairs. Subcommittee hearings were held on April 25, 2013. The bill was reported (amended) on June 17, 2013 alongside House Report 113-112. On Friday, July 19, 2013, House Majority Leader Eric Cantor announced that H.R. 1300 would be on the schedule for Monday, July 22, 2013. H.R. 1300 was considered under a suspension of the rules.

== See also ==
- List of bills in the 113th United States Congress
- United States Fish and Wildlife Service
- Fish and Wildlife Act
- National Oceanic and Atmospheric Administration
