= Forced abortion =

Forced termination of pregnancy

Forced abortion is a form of reproductive coercion that refers to the act of compelling a woman to undergo termination of a pregnancy against her will or without explicit consent. Forced abortion may also be defined as coerced abortion, and may occur due to a variety of outside forces such as societal pressure, or due to intervention by perpetrators such as an intimate partner, parental guardian, medical practitioners, or others who may cause abortion by force, threat or coercion. It may also occur by taking advantage of a situation where a pregnant individual is unable to give consent, or when valid consent is in question due to duress. This may also include the instances when the conduct was neither justified by medical or hospital treatment, which does not include instances in which the pregnant individual is at risk of life-threatening injury due to unsustainable pregnancy. Similar to other forms of reproductive coercion such as forced sterilization, forced abortion may include a physical invasion of female reproductive organs, therefore creating the possibly of causing long term threat or injury preventing viable future pregnancies. Forced abortion is considered a human rights violation by the United Nations due to its failure to comply with the human right to reproductive choice and control without coercion, discrimination, and violence.

== Nazi Germany ==
During World War II, abortion policy in Nazi Germany varied depending on the people, group, and territory the policy was directed at, as German women were forbidden to have an abortion. The commonality between policies was its purpose in promoting the birth rate and population of the putative "Aryan race" and minimizing the population of those such as Jewish, Polish, and Roma women. Additionally, those deemed an overall burden on German society such as the disabled or mentally ill were also subjected to forced abortion with sterilization to follow, and were among the only Germans who were legally subjected to receiving an abortion. These accounts have been categorized as a part of Nazi Germany's "systematic program of genocide, aimed at the destruction of foreign nations and ethnic groups".

After the war ended, the practices of forced abortion towards condemned groups among Nazi society was determined to be a war crime upon assessment during the Nuremberg Trials. Those guilty of encouraging or enforcing abortion during the Holocaust were sentenced to a minimum of 25 years imprisonment due to their practice being considered a "inhumane act of extermination".

== People's Republic of China ==
Forced abortions associated with administration of the one-child policy have occurred in the People's Republic of China; they are a violation of Chinese law and are not official policy. They result from government pressure on local officials who, in turn, employ strong-arm tactics on pregnant mothers. On September 29, 1997, a bill was introduced in the United States Congress titled Forced Abortion Condemnation Act, that sought to "condemn those officials of the Chinese Communist Party, the government of the People's Republic of China and other persons who are involved in the enforcement of forced abortions by preventing such persons from entering or remaining in the United States". In June 2012 Feng Jianmei was forcibly made to abort her 7 month old fetus after not paying a fine for breaking the one-child policy. Her case was widely discussed on the internet in China to general revulsion after photos of the stillborn baby were posted online. A fortnight after the forced abortion she continued to be harassed by local authorities in Shanxi Province. On July 5, the European Parliament passed a resolution saying it "strongly condemns" both Feng's case specifically and forced abortions in general "especially in the context of the one-child policy".

Part of the work of the activist "barefoot lawyer" Chen Guangcheng also concerned excesses of this nature. By 2012, disagreement with forced abortion was being expressed by the public in China, thought to be fuelling pressure to repeal the one-child policy. After the shift to a two-child policy in January 2016, the practice was reported in 2020 to still occur through persecution of the Uyghur minority in Xinjiang leading to the US government imposing sanctions on officials in response.

== North Korean refugees repatriated from China ==
Forced abortions and infanticide are used as a form of punishment in prison camps. The North Korean regime banned pregnancy in its camps in the 1980s. China returns all illegal immigrants from North Korea which usually imprisons them in a short-term facility. Many North Korean defectors assert that forced abortions and infanticide are common in these prisons. The majority of the prisoners held in the Chinese detention centers are women. Repatriated North Koreans are subject to forced abortions regardless of perceived crimes. North Korean police's efforts are to prevent North Korean women from having ethnically mixed children with Han Chinese men. Medical care was not provided to North Korean women who underwent forced abortions.

== United Kingdom ==
On June 21, 2019, the UK Court of Protection ordered a disabled woman to have an abortion against her will. The woman had a moderate mood disorder and learning disability and under the care of an NHS trust, which argued that she was mentally incompetent and that having a child would worsen her mental health. Justice Nathalie Lieven subsequently approved the forced abortion under the Mental Capacity Act 2005 despite the wishes of herself and her mother. The decision was criticized by the Catholic Church, the Disability Rights Commission, and numerous anti-abortion activist groups such as Life and the Society for the Protection of Unborn Children. The case was subsequently overturned by the Court of Appeal.

== United States ==
=== Forced abortion in sex trafficking ===
In a series of focus groups conducted around the United States by anti-trafficking activist Laura Lederer in 2014, over 25% of survivors of domestic sex trafficking who responded to the question reported that they had been forced to have an abortion.

== Russia ==
Forced sterilization and abortion are common practices in Russian psychoneurologic internats (PNIs). Since children cannot legally live in psychoneurologic internats in Russia, and there are no institutions where internats' patients can live with their children, almost all pregnant women are aborted in PNIs. During abortions, PNI patients are also often subjected to forced sterilization - their fallopian tubes are tied, motivated by allegedly detected "serious complications".

== India ==
=== Laws surrounding forced abortions ===
Section 314 in The Indian Penal Code deals with forced abortion, it reads as- 'Whoever, with intent to cause the miscarriage of a woman with child, does any act which causes the death of such woman, shall be punished with imprisonment of either description for a term which may extend to ten years, and shall also be liable to fine; If act done without woman's consent.'

=== Laws surrounding abortion ===
The Medical Termination of Pregnancy Act (MTP) was passed in 1971 in response to the rising incidence of abortions performed without proper medical supervision, which was leading to an alarmingly high number of maternal deaths. Abortion was made legal in India as a result of the MTP statute. Before this legislation, having an abortion was considered a crime, which led to a significant number of women having them despite the risks involved. This legislation establishes norms and restrictions for the termination of pregnancy, which may only be performed by registered medical practitioners (a medical practitioner who has a recognised medical qualification, as defined in section 2 (h) of the Indian Medical Council Act, 1956). The most recent update to this statute was made in 2021, the Medical Termination of Pregnancy (Amendment) Act of 2021 modifies the Medical Termination of Pregnancy Act of 1971 to increase the maximum limit for abortion from 20 to 24 weeks for certain women. The Amendment increases the upper gestational limit from 20 to 24 weeks for certain categories of women, which would be specified in the MTPA 2021 and would include rape survivors, incest victims, and other vulnerable women (such as women with disabilities or minors).

=== Sex selective abortion ===
Researchers anticipate that there would be 6.8 million fewer female births in India by 2030 due to the continued practise of selective abortions. The Pre-Conception and Pre-Natal Diagnostic Techniques Act of 1994 makes it unlawful to divulge the sex of an unborn child save for medical grounds in India. The sex ratio at birth worsened in several states due to inconsistent legal enforcement. Indian authorities often arrest groups who do for pregnancy tests. India's gender ratio—900-930 females for 1,000 males—reflects its attitude towards girls. Males are breadwinners and girls burdens in all socioeconomic classes. Males get healthier diets and better access to medical treatment than girls.

== See also ==
- Feticide
- Sex-selective abortion
- Childless Hundred Days
- Baby hatch
