= Jia, Guan County =

Jia 贾镇
- Town
- Location in Shandong Jia (China)
- Coordinates: 36°30′28″N 115°36′29″E
- Country: People's Republic of China
- Province: Shandong
- Prefecture-level city: Liaocheng
- County: Guan
- Time zone: UTC+8 (China Standard)

Jia (Chinese: 贾镇) is a town in Guan County, Liaocheng, in western Shandong province, China.
