= Yanzhuang Subdistrict =

Yanzhuang Subdistrict 烟庄街道
- Subdistrict
- Location in Shandong Yanzhuang (China)
- Coordinates: 36°29′41″N 115°31′21″E
- Country: People's Republic of China
- Province: Shandong
- Prefecture-level city: Liaocheng
- County: Guan
- Elevation: 42 m (138 ft)
- Time zone: UTC+8 (China Standard)
- Area code: 0635

Yanzhuang Subdistrict (simplified Chinese: 烟庄街道; traditional Chinese: 煙莊街道; pinyin: Yānzhuāng Jiēdào) is a subdistrict of Guan County in northwestern Shandong province, China. As of 2011, it has 34 villages under its administration.

== See also ==
- List of township-level divisions of Shandong
