= Qingshui, Shandong =

Qingshui 清水镇
- Town
- Location in Shandong Qingshui (China)
- Coordinates: 36°37′18″N 115°31′41″E
- Country: People's Republic of China
- Province: Shandong
- Prefecture-level city: Liaocheng
- County: Guan
- Time zone: UTC+8 (China Standard)

Qingshui (Chinese: 清水镇) is a town in Guan County, Liaocheng, in western Shandong province, China.
