= Childless Hundred Days =

Campaign of mass forced abortions in China

- Traditional Chinese: 百日無孩
- Simplified Chinese: 百日无孩
Transcriptions

Childless Hundred Days (Chinese: 百日无孩), also called The Slaughter of the Lambs, was a campaign of mass forced abortions in Shen County and Guan County in Shandong, China. The campaign started on 1 May 1991 and ended on 10 August 1991. It was designed to reduce local population growth, under the national One-child policy. The campaign was initiated by the local Party Committee Secretary Zeng Zhaoqi (曾昭起) and Bai Zhigang (白志刚).

During the campaign, local officials were asked to perform forced abortions on any pregnant woman in these areas regardless of pregnancy terms or whether the unborn child is the first child of the family. The policy led to mass panic and dramatic reduction of the local population in 1991.

== Implementation ==
In April 1991, Zang Zhaoqi, Guan County's new party secretary, noticed that Guan ranked last in the province in family planning. He announced at a meeting with party officials that month that there were to be no births for a 100 day period, lasting from 1 May to 10 August. To enforce this, all pregnancies were to be aborted, regardless of whether such pregnancies violated the one-child policy, or how far into the pregnancy the abortion would occur.

Enforcers would find pregnant women and force them onto trucks. The abortions were typically performed by giving the women labor-inducing injections, though a former enforcer claimed that many were simply done by kicking the woman in the stomach. Women who refused would allegedly have their houses destroyed and their loved ones kidnapped as intimidation. Most of the enforcers were brought in from other regions, as locals refused to hurt people they knew.

Some women did give live birth while detained. Accounts vary on what would happen to these infants. Some claim that these children were spared, while others claim they were strangled at birth. The mothers would still be fined and forcibly sterilized.

== Aftermath ==
Because the incident occurred during the Year of the Ram in the Chinese Zodiac, it came to be known as the "Slaughtering of the Lambs", and the officials involved were nicknamed "Slaughterers of the Lambs".

Zang Zhaoqi was later promoted to deputy head of the provincial Committee on Caring for Future Generations.

The incident is often mentioned in discussions on reproductive rights in China. In an article on China's crash in birthrates, the Sydney Morning Herald cited it as an "ominous precedent for the interference of the Chinese state in reproductive rights."
