= Guan County, Shandong =

Guanxian 冠县
- County
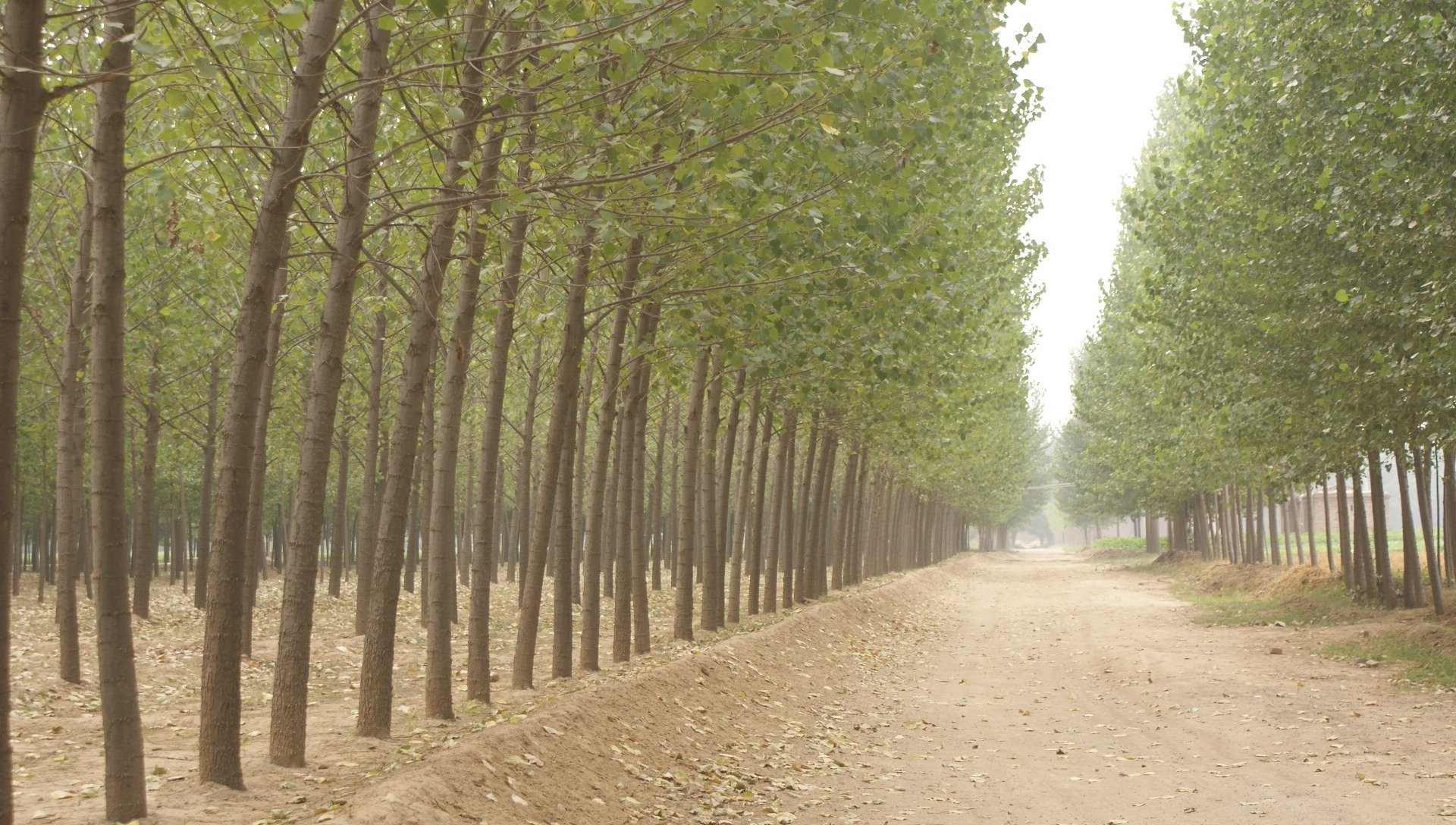

- Location of the seat in Shandong
- Coordinates: 36.484°N 115.443°E
- Country: People's Republic of China
- Province: Shandong
- Prefecture-level city: Liaocheng

Area
  - Total: 1,161 km^{2} (448 sq mi)

Population (2019)
  - Total: 793,100
  - Density: 683.1/km^{2} (1,769/sq mi)
- Time zone: UTC+8 (China Standard)
- Postal Code: 252500

Guanxian
- Traditional Chinese: 冠縣
- Simplified Chinese: 冠县
- Postal: Kwanhsien
Transcriptions
Standard Mandarin
- Hanyu Pinyin: Guàn Xiàn
- Wade–Giles: Kuan^{4}-hsien^{4}

Guan County (simplified Chinese: 冠县; traditional Chinese: 冠縣; pinyin: Guàn Xiàn) is a county of western Shandong province, People's Republic of China, bordered by Hebei province to the west. It is administered by Liaocheng City.

The population was 730,300 in 1999.

It was one of two counties where the Childless Hundred Days took place, the other being Shen County.

== History ==
As an isolated county, with relatively low education levels and a weak orthodox gentry, Guan long served as center for secret societies and heterodox sects. For example, Guan was one of the earliest places where Yi-he boxing was practised, namely in 1779. This material arts style later served as base for the prominent Yìhéquán (Boxer) movement. In 1861–63, the county was also the center of a rebellion against the Qing dynasty, led by Song Jing-shi and supported by the White Lotus. In the last decades of the Qing Empire and the early Republic, Guan County was home to the Red as well as Green Gangs, the Yellow Sand Society, and the "Way of the Sages". In the Second Sino-Japanese War, the county was on the frontlines of battle between communist and Japanese forces. During the Great Leap Forward, Guan County was governed by local cadres (many of them veterans of anti-Japanese resistance) who vigorously resisted collectivization, mitigating the famine mortality rate in the county. This conservative clique held power well into the Cultural Revolution, which it also resisted, until it was violently unseated in 1969. Ensuing clashes resulted in the deaths of sixty people.

== Administrative divisions ==
As of 2012, this County is divided to 3 subdistricts, 7 towns and 8 townships.

Subdistricts

- Qingquan Subdistrict (清泉街道)
- Chongwen Subdistrict (崇文街道)
- Yanzhuang Subdistrict (烟庄街道)

Towns

- Jia (贾镇)
- Sang'e (桑阿镇)
- Liulin (柳林镇)
- Qingshui (清水镇)
- Donggucheng (东古城镇)
- Beiguantao (北馆陶镇)
- Dianzi (店子镇)

Townships

- Xiedian Township (斜店乡)
- Liangtang Township (梁堂乡)
- Dingyuanzhai Township (定远寨乡)
- Xinji Township (辛集乡)
- Fanzhai Township (范寨乡)
- Ganguantun Township (甘官屯乡)
- Lanwo Township (兰沃乡)
- Wanshan Township (万善乡)

== Climate ==
Climate data for Guanxian, elevation 39 m (128 ft), (1991–2020 normals, extremes 1991–present)
Month	Jan	Feb	Mar	Apr	May	Jun	Jul	Aug	Sep	Oct	Nov	Dec	Year
Record high °C (°F)	16.7 (62.1)	23.6 (74.5)	29.1 (84.4)	34.0 (93.2)	39.0 (102.2)	41.6 (106.9)	41.0 (105.8)	36.7 (98.1)	38.1 (100.6)	34.5 (94.1)	27.3 (81.1)	18.3 (64.9)	41.6 (106.9)
Mean daily maximum °C (°F)	4.0 (39.2)	8.3 (46.9)	14.9 (58.8)	21.4 (70.5)	27.0 (80.6)	31.9 (89.4)	32.0 (89.6)	30.5 (86.9)	27.1 (80.8)	21.3 (70.3)	12.7 (54.9)	5.7 (42.3)	19.7 (67.5)
Daily mean °C (°F)	−1.5 (29.3)	2.2 (36.0)	8.6 (47.5)	15.1 (59.2)	20.8 (69.4)	25.7 (78.3)	27.1 (80.8)	25.6 (78.1)	20.9 (69.6)	14.5 (58.1)	6.6 (43.9)	0.2 (32.4)	13.8 (56.9)
Mean daily minimum °C (°F)	−5.6 (21.9)	−2.3 (27.9)	3.3 (37.9)	9.5 (49.1)	15.0 (59.0)	20.1 (68.2)	23.0 (73.4)	21.8 (71.2)	16.2 (61.2)	9.4 (48.9)	1.9 (35.4)	−3.8 (25.2)	9.0 (48.3)
Record low °C (°F)	−17.8 (0.0)	−14.1 (6.6)	−7.3 (18.9)	−2.1 (28.2)	4.3 (39.7)	11.2 (52.2)	16.5 (61.7)	12.5 (54.5)	5.3 (41.5)	−2.8 (27.0)	−15.9 (3.4)	−15.5 (4.1)	−17.8 (0.0)
Average precipitation mm (inches)	3.7 (0.15)	8.6 (0.34)	10.1 (0.40)	28.4 (1.12)	38.7 (1.52)	68.4 (2.69)	154.6 (6.09)	117.6 (4.63)	47.9 (1.89)	31.0 (1.22)	19.1 (0.75)	5.0 (0.20)	533.1 (21)
Average precipitation days (≥ 0.1 mm)	2.1	3.3	2.8	5.0	6.4	7.7	10.9	9.9	6.7	5.2	4.3	2.6	66.9
Average snowy days	2.7	2.8	0.8	0.2	0	0	0	0	0	0	1.0	2.1	9.6
Average relative humidity (%)	62	57	53	59	64	62	78	82	76	71	69	66	67
Mean monthly sunshine hours	132.0	145.0	196.8	219.6	246.9	218.8	179.6	184.3	180.1	175.1	145.0	135.0	2,158.2
Percentage possible sunshine	43	47	53	56	56	50	41	44	49	51	48	45	49
Source: China Meteorological Administration

== Bibliography ==
- Esherick, Joseph W. (1987). The Origins of the Boxer Uprising. Berkeley, California; Los Angeles; London: University of California Press.
