= Beiguantao =

Beiguantao 北馆陶镇
- Town
- Location in Shandong Beiguantao (China)
- Coordinates: 36°39′16″N 115°24′35″E
- Country: People's Republic of China
- Province: Shandong
- Prefecture-level city: Liaocheng
- County: Guan
- Time zone: UTC+8 (China Standard)

Beiguantao (Chinese: 北馆陶镇) is a town in Guan County, Liaocheng, in western Shandong province, China.
