= Fish and Wildlife Act =

Fish and Wildlife Act of 1956
- Enacted by: the 84th United States Congress
- Effective: August 8, 1956

Legislative history
- Passed the House on April 27, 1956 (388-19); Signed into law by President Dwight D. Eisenhower on August 15, 1956

Fish and Wildlife Act of 1956 (ch. 1036, 70 Stat. 1119, 16 U.S.C. § 742a) of the United States of America establishes "a comprehensive national fish, shellfish, and wildlife resources policy with emphasis on the commercial fishing industry but also with a direction to administer the Act with regard to the inherent right of every citizen and resident to fish for pleasure, enjoyment, and betterment and to maintain and increase public opportunities for recreational use of fish and wildlife resources." Among other things, it directs a program of continuing research, extension, and information services on fish and wildlife matters, both domestically and internationally. It confirmed the position of Commissioner of Fish and Wildlife and a United States Fish and Wildlife Service in the Department of the Interior, and established a Bureau of Sport Fisheries and Wildlife and a Bureau of Commercial Fisheries.

== Amendments ==
Reorganization Plan No. IV, October 3, 1970 (84 Stat. 2090), abolished the Bureau of Commercial Fisheries and transferred functions related to commercial fisheries and marine sport fisheries, except Great Lakes fishery research and certain other fishery related activities, to the Department of Commerce, National Oceanic and Atmospheric Administration.

Pub. L. 92–159, approved November 18, 1971 (85 Stat. 480) and subsequently amended by Pub. L. 92–502, approved October 28, 1972 (86 Stat. 905) added to the 1956 Act a new section 13 (16 U.S.C. 742j-1), which is commonly referred to as the Airborne Hunting Act or Shooting from Aircraft Act.

Effective July 1, 1974, the Bureau of Sport Fisheries and Wildlife and the position of Commissioner were abolished by Pub. L. 93–271, approved April 22, 1974 (88 Stat. 92). This amendment to the 1956 Act vested responsibilities of the Bureau in a redesignated United States Fish and Wildlife Service to be administered by a Director under the supervision of an assistant director of the Interior for Fish and Wildlife. This amendment also specified qualifications of the Director of the Service and established method of appointment.

Pub. L. 95–616 (92 Stat. 3110) amended the 1956 law to allow the Service to accept donations of both real and personal property. It also facilitates the use of volunteers for Service projects and authorized appropriations to carry out a volunteer program.

Pub. L. 98–498 (98 Stat. 2310; 16 U.S.C. 742c), approved October 19, 1984, extended until December 1, 1986, the authority and authorization of appropriations for the volunteer programs under the Act. It also requires fishing vessels to be reconstructed or reconditioned in the United States in order to receive funds.

Pub. L. 105–242 (text) (PDF) (112 Stat. 1575), approved October 5, 1998, amended the Fish and Wildlife Act of 1956 to "promote volunteer programs and community partnerships for the benefit of national wildlife refuges". It enabled the senate to create 20 volunteer coordinators who supervise the training and recruiting of volunteers in all of the FWS's regions. It also established a Senior Volunteer Corps for people over 50. Finally, it requires the Secretary of the Interior to develop programs to teach children about the National Refuge System in order to promote science and improve scientific literacy through both formal and informal education programs.

A 2013 amendment to the bill extended through FY2017 "the authorization of appropriations for volunteer services for programs conducted by the United States Fish and Wildlife Service or the National Oceanic and Atmospheric Administration (NOAA), community partnership projects for national wildlife refuges, and refuge education programs".
