= Public Works and Economic Development Act of 1965 =

The Public Works and Economic Development Act of 1965 (Pub.L. 89−136, 79 Stat. 552) established the Economic Development Administration in the United States Department of Commerce to provide grants to economically distressed communities to support employment and industrial and commercial growth.

== History ==
The bill became law on August 26, 1965 and was substantially amended by the Economic Development Administration Reform Act of 1998.
