= Forced Abortion Condemnation Act =

Proposed U.S. federal legislation

Forced Abortion Condemnation Act is a bill, introduced at the 105th United States Congress on September 29, 1997, by the Republican sponsor Tillie Fowler. It sought to "condemn those officials of the Chinese Communist Party, the Government of the People's Republic of China, and other persons who are involved in the enforcement of forced abortions by preventing such persons from entering or remaining in the United States". On November 6, 1997, the bill passed the U.S. House of Representatives, but was not passed by the Senate.

The bill was re-introduced on January 6, 1999, at the subsequent meeting of the U.S. Congress, but was not enacted either as it was opposed by the Clinton administration.
