= List of acts of the 104th United States Congress =

The list of acts of the 104th United States Congress includes all Acts of Congress and ratified treaties by the 104th United States Congress, which lasted from January 3, 1995, to January 3, 1997.

Acts include public and private laws, which are enacted after being passed by Congress and signed by the President, however if the President vetoes a bill it can still be enacted by a two-thirds vote in both houses. The Senate alone considers treaties, which are ratified by a two-thirds vote.

== Summary of actions ==
President William J. Clinton vetoed the following acts of this Congress. (List of United States presidential vetoes#Bill Clinton).

1. June 7, 1995: Vetoed H.R. 1158, Emergency Supplemental Appropriations for Additional Disaster Assistance and Recissions for Fiscal Year 1995. No override attempt made.
2. August 11, 1995: Vetoed S. 21, Bosnia and Herzegovina Self-Defense Act of 1995. No override attempt made.
3. October 3, 1995: Vetoed H.R. 1854, Legislative Branch Appropriations Act, FY 1996. No override attempt made.
4. November 13, 1995: Vetoed H.J.Res. 115, Second Continuing Resolution for fiscal year 1996. No override attempt made.
5. November 13, 1995: Vetoed H.R. 2586, Temporary Increase in the Statutory Debt Limit. No override attempt made.
6. December 6, 1995: Vetoed H.R. 2491, Seven-Year Balanced Budget Reconciliation Act of 1995. No override attempted.
7. December 18, 1995: Vetoed H.R. 1977, Department of the Interior and Related Agencies Appropriations Act, 1996. Override attempt failed in House, 239-177 (278 needed).
8. December 18, 1995: Vetoed H.R. 2099, Department of the Interior and Related Agencies Appropriations Act, 1996. No override attempted.
9. December 19, 1995: Vetoed H.R. 1058, Private Securities Litigation Reform Act of 1995. Overridden by House, 319-100 (280 needed). Overridden by Senate, 68-30 (66 needed), and enacted as Pub. L. 104–67 (text) (PDF) over veto.
10. December 19, 1995: Vetoed H.R. 2076, Departments of Commerce, Justice, and State, the Judiciary, and Related Agencies Appropriations Act, 1996. Override attempt failed in House, 240-159 (266 needed).
11. December 28, 1995: Vetoed H.R. 1530, National Defense Authorization Act for Fiscal Year 1996. Override attempt failed in House, 240-156 (264 needed).
12. January 9, 1996: Vetoed H.R. 4, Personal Responsibility and Work Opportunity Act of 1995. No override attempt made.
13. April 10, 1996: Vetoed H.R. 1833, Partial-Birth Abortion Ban Act of 1995. Overridden in House, 285-137 (282 needed). Override attempt failed in Senate, 58-40 (66 needed).
14. April 12, 1996: Vetoed H.R. 1561, Foreign Relations Authorization Act, Fiscal Years 1996 and 1997. Override attempt failed in House, 234-188 (282 needed).
15. May 2, 1996: Vetoed H.R. 956, Common Sense Product Liability Legal Reform Act of 1996. Override attempt failed in House, 258-163 (281 needed).
16. July 30, 1996: Vetoed H.R. 743, Teamwork for Employees and Managers Act of 1995. No override attempt made.
17. October 2, 1996: Vetoed H.R. 2909, Silvio O. Conte National Fish and Wildlife Refuge Eminent Domain Prevention Act. No override attempt made.

== Public laws ==
The following 333 Public Laws were enacted during this Congress (Congress.gov):

Public law number (Linked to Wikisource)	Date of enactment	Short title	Long title	Link to Legislink.org
104-1	January 23, 1995	Congressional Accountability Act of 1995	To make certain laws applicable to the legislative branch of the Federal Government.	Pub. L. 104–1 (text) (PDF)
104-2	February 9, 1995	(No short title)	To amend section 61h-6 of title 2, United States Code.	Pub. L. 104–2 (text) (PDF)
104-3	March 7, 1995	(No short title)	To amend the charter of the Veterans of Foreign Wars to make eligible for membership those veterans that have served within the territorial limits of South Korea.	Pub. L. 104–3 (text) (PDF)
104-4	March 22, 1995	Unfunded Mandates Reform Act of 1995	To curb the practice of imposing unfunded Federal mandates on States and local governments; to strengthen the partnership between the Federal Government and State, local and tribal governments; to end the imposition, in the absence of full consideration by Congress, of Federal mandates on State, local, and tribal governments without adequate funding, in a manner that may displace other essential governmental priorities; and to ensure that the Federal Government pays the costs incurred by those governments in complying with certain requirements under Federal statutes and regulations, and for other purposes.	Pub. L. 104–4 (text) (PDF)
104-5	March 23, 1995	(No short title)	To amend a provision of part A of title IX of the Elementary and Secondary Education Act of 1965, relating to Indian education, to provide a technical amendment, and for other purposes.	Pub. L. 104–5 (text) (PDF)
104-6	April 10, 1995	Emergency Supplemental Appropriations and Rescissions for the Department of Defense to Preserve and Enhance Military Readiness Act of 1995; Mexican Debt Disclosure Act of 1995	Making emergency supplemental appropriations and rescissions to preserve and enhance the military readiness of the Department of Defense for the fiscal year ending September 30, 1995, and for other purposes.	Pub. L. 104–6 (text) (PDF)
104-7	April 11, 1995	(No short title)	To amend the Internal Revenue Code of 1986 to permanently extend the deduction for the health insurance costs of self-employed individuals, to repeal the provision permitting nonrecognition of gain on sales and exchanges effectuating policies of the Federal Communications Commission, and for other purposes.	Pub. L. 104–7 (text) (PDF)
104-8	April 17, 1995	District of Columbia Financial Responsibility and Management Assistance Act of 1995	To eliminate budget deficits and management inefficiencies in the government of the District of Columbia through the establishment of the District of Columbia Financial Responsibility and Management Assistance Authority, and for other purposes.	Pub. L. 104–8 (text) (PDF)
104-9	April 21, 1995	CFTC Reauthorization Act of 1995	To amend the Commodity Exchange Act to extend the authorization for the Commodity Futures Trading Commission, and for other purposes.	Pub. L. 104–9 (text) (PDF)
104-10	May 18, 1995	(No short title)	To amend the Alaska Native Claims Settlement Act to provide for the purchase of common stock of Cook Inlet Region, and for other purposes.	Pub. L. 104–10 (text) (PDF)
104-11	May 18, 1995	Chacoan Outliers Protection Act of 1995	To amend title V of Pub. L. 96–550, designating the Chaco Culture Archeological Protection Sites, and for other purposes.	Pub. L. 104–11 (text) (PDF)
104-12	May 18, 1995	Truth in Lending Class Action Relief Act of 1995	To provide a moratorium on certain class action lawsuits relating to the Truth in Lending Act.	Pub. L. 104–12 (text) (PDF)
104-13	May 22, 1995	Paperwork Reduction Act of 1995	To further the goals of the Paperwork Reduction Act to have Federal agencies become more responsible and publicly accountable for reducing the burden of Federal paperwork on the public, and for other purposes.	Pub. L. 104–13 (text) (PDF)
104-14	June 3, 1995	(No short title)	To provide that references in the statutes of the United States to any committee or officer of the House of Representatives the name or jurisdiction of which was changed as part of the reorganization of the House of Representatives at the beginning of the One Hundred Fourth Congress shall be treated as referring to the currently applicable committee or officer of the House of Representatives.	Pub. L. 104–14 (text) (PDF)
104-15	June 21, 1995	(No short title)	To reauthorize appropriations for the Navajo-Hopi Relocation Housing Program.	Pub. L. 104–15 (text) (PDF)
104-16	June 21, 1995	(No short title)	To reauthorize appropriations for certain programs under the Indian Child Protection and Family Violence Prevention Act, and for other purposes.	Pub. L. 104–16 (text) (PDF)
104-17	July 2, 1995	(No short title)	To extend authorities under the Middle East Peace Facilitation Act of 1994 until August 15, 1995.	Pub. L. 104–17 (text) (PDF)
104-18	July 7, 1995	(No short title)	To amend the Omnibus Budget Reconciliation Act of 1990 to permit medicare select policies to be offered in all States.	Pub. L. 104–18 (text) (PDF)
104-19	July 27, 1995	Emergency Supplemental Appropriations for Additional Disaster Assistance, for Anti-terrorism Initiatives, for Assistance in the Recovery from the Tragedy that Occurred at Oklahoma City, and Rescissions Act, 1995	Making emergency supplemental appropriations for additional disaster assistance, for anti-terrorism initiatives, for assistance in the recovery from the tragedy that occurred at Oklahoma City, and making rescissions for the fiscal year ending September 30, 1995, and for other purposes.	Pub. L. 104–19 (text) (PDF)
104-20	July 28, 1995	(No short title)	To amend the Colorado River Basin Salinity Control Act to authorize additional measures to carry out the control of salinity upstream of Imperial Dam in a cost-effective manner, and for other purposes.	Pub. L. 104–20 (text) (PDF)
104-21	August 4, 1995	District of Columbia Emergency Highway Relief Act	To authorize an increased Federal share of the costs of certain transportation projects in the District of Columbia for fiscal years 1995 and 1996, and for other purposes.	Pub. L. 104–21 (text) (PDF)
104-22	August 14, 1995	(No short title)	To extend authorities under the Middle East Peace Facilitation Act of 1994 until October 1, 1995, and for other purposes.	Pub. L. 104–22 (text) (PDF)
104-23	September 6, 1995	Corning National Fish Hatchery Conveyance Act	To direct the Secretary of the Interior to convey the Corning National Fish Hatchery to the State of Arkansas.	Pub. L. 104–23 (text) (PDF)
104-24	September 6, 1995	(No short title)	To direct the Secretary of the Interior to convey a fish hatchery to the State of Iowa.	Pub. L. 104–24 (text) (PDF)
104-25	September 6, 1995	(No short title)	To direct the Secretary of the Interior to convey to the State of Minnesota the New London National Fish Hatchery production facility.	Pub. L. 104–25 (text) (PDF)
104-26	September 6, 1995	Court Reporter Fair Labor Amendments of 1995	To amend the Fair Labor Standards Act of 1938 to exempt employees who perform certain court reporting duties from the compensatory time requirements applicable to certain public agencies, and for other purposes.	Pub. L. 104–26 (text) (PDF)
104-27	September 6, 1995	(No short title)	To designate the United States Post Office building located at 33 College Avenue in Waterville, Maine, as the "George J. Mitchell Post Office Building"	Pub. L. 104–27 (text) (PDF)
104-28	September 6, 1995	District of Columbia Convention Center and Sports Arena Authorization Act of 1995	To permit the Washington Convention Center Authority to expend revenues for the operation and maintenance of the existing Washington Convention Center and for preconstruction activities relating to a new convention center in the District of Columbia, to permit a designated authority of the District of Columbia to borrow funds for the preconstruction activities relating to a sports arena in the District of Columbia and to permit certain revenues to be pledged as security for the borrowing of such funds, and for other purposes.	Pub. L. 104–28 (text) (PDF)
104-29	September 30, 1995	Truth in Lending Act Amendments of 1995	To amend the Truth in Lending Act to clarify the intent of such Act and to reduce burdensome regulatory requirements on creditors.	Pub. L. 104–29 (text) (PDF)
104-30	September 30, 1995	(No short title)	To extend authorities under the Middle East Peace Facilitation Act of 1994 until November 1, 1995, and for other purposes.	Pub. L. 104–30 (text) (PDF)
104-31	September 30, 1995	(No short title)	Making continuing appropriations for the fiscal year 1996, and for other purposes.	Pub. L. 104–31 (text) (PDF)
104-32	October 3, 1995	Military Construction Appropriations Act, 1996	Making appropriations for military construction, family housing, and base realignment and closure for the Department of Defense for the fiscal year ending September 30, 1996, and for other purposes.	Pub. L. 104–32 (text) (PDF)
104-33	October 3, 1995	(No short title)	To make the reporting deadlines for studies conducted in Federal court demonstration districts consistent with the deadlines for pilot districts, and for other purposes.	Pub. L. 104–33 (text) (PDF)
104-34	October 3, 1995	(No short title)	To clarify the rules governing venue, and for other purposes.	Pub. L. 104–34 (text) (PDF)
104-35	October 12, 1995	(No short title)	To amend part D of title IV of the Social Security Act to extend for 2 years the deadline by which States are required to have in effect an automated data processing and information retrieval system for use in the administration of State plans for child and spousal support.	Pub. L. 104–35 (text) (PDF)
104-36	October 12, 1995	Small Business Lending Enhancement Act of 1995	To amend the Small Business Act and the Small Business Investment Act of 1958 to reduce the cost to the Federal Government of guaranteeing certain loans and debentures, and for other purposes.	Pub. L. 104–36 (text) (PDF)
104-37	October 21, 1995	Agriculture, Rural Development, Food and Drug Administration, and Related Agencies Appropriations Act, 1996	Making appropriations for Agriculture, Rural Development, Food and Drug Administration, and Related Agencies programs for the fiscal year ending September 30, 1996, and for other purposes.	Pub. L. 104–37 (text) (PDF)
104-38	October 30, 1995	(No short title)	To disapprove of amendments to the Federal Sentencing Guidelines relating to lowering of crack sentences and sentences for money laundering and transactions in property derived from unlawful activity.	Pub. L. 104–38 (text) (PDF)
104-39	November 1, 1995	Digital Performance Right in Sound Recordings Act of 1995	To amend title 17, United States Code, to provide an exclusive right to perform sound recordings publicly by means of digital transmissions, and for other purposes.	Pub. L. 104–39 (text) (PDF)
104-40	November 1, 1995	(No short title)	To authorize the collection of fees for expenses for triploid grass carp certification inspections, and for other purposes	Pub. L. 104–40 (text) (PDF)
104-41	November 1, 1995	(No short title)	To amend title 35, United States Code, with respect to patents on biotechnological processes.	Pub. L. 104–41 (text) (PDF)
104-42	November 2, 1995	(No short title)	To amend the Alaska Native Claims Settlement Act, and for other purposes.	Pub. L. 104–42 (text) (PDF)
104-43	November 3, 1995	Fisheries Act of 1995	To amend the Fishermen's Protective Act.: Title I - High Seas Fishing Compliance Act of 1995; Title II - Northwest Atlantic Fisheries Convention Act of 1995; Title III - Atlantic Tunas Convention Authorization Act of 1995; Title V - Sea of Okhotsk Fisheries Enforcement Act of 1995; Title VI - High Seas Driftnet Fishing Moratorium Protection Act; Title VII - Yukon River Salmon Act of 1995	Pub. L. 104–43 (text) (PDF)
104-44	November 3, 1995	(No short title)	To designate the United States Post Office building located at 201 East Pikes Peak Avenue in Colorado Springs, Colorado, as the "Winfield Scott Stratton Post Office"	Pub. L. 104–44 (text) (PDF)
104-45	November 8, 1995	Jerusalem Embassy Act of 1995	To provide for the relocation of the United States Embassy in Israel to Jerusalem, and for other purposes.	Pub. L. 104–45 (text) (PDF)
104-46	November 13, 1995	Energy and Water Development Appropriations Act, 1996	Making appropriations for energy and water development for the fiscal year ending September 30, 1996, and for other purposes.	Pub. L. 104–46 (text) (PDF)
104-47	November 13, 1995	(No short title)	To extend authorities under the Middle East Peace Facilitation Act of 1994 until Nov. 13, 1995	Pub. L. 104–47 (text) (PDF)
104-48	November 15, 1995	Perishable Agricultural Commodities Act Amendments of 1995	To amend the Perishable Agricultural Commodities Act, 1930, to modernize, streamline, and strengthen the operation of the Act.	Pub. L. 104–48 (text) (PDF)
104-49	November 15, 1995	(No short title)	Respecting the relationship between workers' compensation benefits and the benefits available under the Migrant and Seasonal Agricultural Worker Protection Act.	Pub. L. 104–49 (text) (PDF)
104-50	November 15, 1995	Department of Transportation and Related Agencies Appropriations Act, 1996	Making appropriations for the Department of Transportation and related agencies for the fiscal year ending September 30, 1996, and for other purposes.	Pub. L. 104–50 (text) (PDF)
104-51	November 15, 1995	(No short title)	To amend the Immigration and Nationality Act to update references in the classification of children for purposes of United States immigration laws.	Pub. L. 104–51 (text) (PDF)
104-52	November 19, 1995	Treasury, Postal Service, and General Government Appropriations Act, 1996	Making appropriations for the Treasury Department, the United States Postal Service, the Executive Office of the President, and certain Independent Agencies, for the fiscal year ending September 30, 1996, and for other purposes.	Pub. L. 104–52 (text) (PDF)
104-53	November 19, 1995	Legislative Branch Appropriations Act, 1996	Making appropriations for the Legislative Branch for the fiscal year ending September 30, 1996, and for other purposes.	Pub. L. 104–53 (text) (PDF)
104-54	November 19, 1995	(No short title)	Making further continuing appropriations for the fiscal year 1996, and for other purposes.	Pub. L. 104–54 (text) (PDF)
104-55	November 20, 1995	Edible Oil Regulatory Reform Act	To require the head of any Federal agency to differentiate between fats, oils, and greases of animal, marine, or vegetable origin, and other oils and greases, in issuing certain regulations, and for other purposes.	Pub. L. 104–55 (text) (PDF)
104-56	November 20, 1995	(No short title)	Making further continuing appropriations for the fiscal year 1996, and for other purposes.	Pub. L. 104–56 (text) (PDF)
104-57	November 22, 1995	Veterans' Compensation Cost-of-Living Adjustment Act of 1995	To increase, effective as of December 1, 1995, the rates of compensation for veterans with service-connected disabilities and the rates of dependency and indemnity compensation for the survivors of certain disabled veterans.	Pub. L. 104–57 (text) (PDF)
104-58	November 28, 1995	Alaska Power Administration Asset Sale and Termination Act	To authorize and direct the Secretary of Energy to sell the Alaska Power Administration, and to authorize the export of Alaska North Slope crude oil, and for other purposes.	Pub. L. 104–58 (text) (PDF)
104-59	November 28, 1995	National Highway System Designation Act of 1995	To amend title 23, United States Code, to provide for the designation of the National Highway System, and for other purposes.	Pub. L. 104–59 (text) (PDF)
104-60	November 28, 1995	(No short title)	To amend the commencement dates of certain temporary Federal judgeships.	Pub. L. 104–60 (text) (PDF)
104-61	December 1, 1995	Department of Defense Appropriations Act, 1996	Making appropriations for the Department of Defense for the fiscal year ending September 30, 1996, and for other purposes.	Pub. L. 104–61 (text) (PDF)
104-62	December 8, 1995	Philanthropy Protection Act of 1995	To facilitate contributions to charitable organizations by codifying certain exemptions from the Federal securities laws, and for other purposes	Pub. L. 104–62 (text) (PDF)
104-63	December 8, 1995	Charitable Gift Annuity Antitrust Relief Act of 1995	To modify the operation of the antitrust laws, and of State laws similar to the antitrust laws, with respect to charitable gift annuities.	Pub. L. 104–63 (text) (PDF)
104-64	December 18, 1995	Defense Production Act Amendments of 1995	To extend and reauthorize the Defense Production Act of 1950, and for other purposes.	Pub. L. 104–64 (text) (PDF)
104-65	December 19, 1995	Lobbying Disclosure Act of 1995	To provide for the disclosure of lobbying activities to influence the Federal Government, and for other purposes	Pub. L. 104–65 (text) (PDF)
104-66	December 21, 1995	Federal Reports Elimination and Sunset Act of 1995	To provide for the modification or elimination of Federal reporting requirements.	Pub. L. 104–66 (text) (PDF)
104-67	December 22, 1995 (vetoed, overridden by Congress)	Private Securities Litigation Reform Act of 1995	To reform Federal securities litigation, and for other purposes.	Pub. L. 104–67 (text) (PDF)
104-68	December 22, 1995	(No short title)	To designate the Federal Triangle Project under construction at 14th Street and Pennsylvania Avenue, Northwest, in the District of Columbia, as the "Ronald Reagan Building and International Trade Center".	Pub. L. 104–68 (text) (PDF)
104-69	December 22, 1995	(No short title)	Making further continuing appropriations for the fiscal year 1996, and for other purposes.	Pub. L. 104–69 (text) (PDF)
104-70	December 23, 1995	(No short title)	To amend the Clean Air Act to provide for an optional provision for the reduction of work-related vehicle trips and miles travelled in ozone nonattainment areas designated as severe, and for other purposes.	Pub. L. 104–70 (text) (PDF)
104-71	December 23, 1995	Sex Crimes Against Children Prevention Act of 1995	To combat crime by enhancing the penalties for certain sexual crimes against children.	Pub. L. 104–71 (text) (PDF)
104-72	December 23, 1995	(No short title)	To extend au pair programs.	Pub. L. 104–72 (text) (PDF)
104-73	December 26, 1995	Federally Supported Health Centers Assistance Act of 1995	To amend the Public Health Service Act to permanently extend and clarify malpractice coverage for health centers, and for other purposes.	Pub. L. 104–73 (text) (PDF)
104-74	December 26, 1995	(No short title)	To amend the Doug Barnard, Jr.—1996 Atlanta Centennial Olympic Games Commemorative Coin Act, and for other purposes.	Pub. L. 104–74 (text) (PDF)
104-75	December 28, 1995	(No short title)	To designate the United States courthouse and Federal building to be constructed at the southeastern corner of Liberty and South Virginia Streets in Reno, Nevada, as the "Bruce R. Thompson United States Courthouse and Federal Building"	Pub. L. 104–75 (text) (PDF)
104-76	December 28, 1995	Housing for Older Persons Act	To amend the Fair Housing Act to modify the exemption from certain familial status discrimination prohibitions granted to housing for older persons.	Pub. L. 104–76 (text) (PDF)
104-77	December 28, 1995	(No short title)	To designate the Federal building located at 600 Martin Luther King, Jr. Place in Louisville, Kentucky, as the "Romano L. Mazzoli Federal Building"	Pub. L. 104–77 (text) (PDF)
104-78	December 28, 1995	(No short title)	To rename the San Francisco Bay National Wildlife Refuge as the Don Edwards San Francisco Bay National Wildlife Refuge	Pub. L. 104–78 (text) (PDF)
104-79	December 28, 1995	(No short title)	To amend the Federal Election Campaign Act of 1971 to improve the electoral process by permitting electronic filing and preservation of Federal Election Commission reports, and for other purposes.	Pub. L. 104–79 (text) (PDF)
104-80	December 28, 1995	(No short title)	To designate the United States courthouse located at 800 Market Street in Knoxville, Tennessee, as the "Howard H. Baker, Jr. United States Courthouse".	Pub. L. 104–80 (text) (PDF)
104-81	December 28, 1995	(No short title)	Providing for the reappointment of Homer Alfred Neal as a citizen regent of the Board of Regents of the Smithsonian Institution.	Pub. L. 104–81 (text) (PDF)
104-82	December 28, 1995	(No short title)	Providing for the appointment of Howard H. Baker, Jr. as a citizen regent of the Board of Regents of the Smithsonian Institution.	Pub. L. 104–82 (text) (PDF)
104-83	December 28, 1995	(No short title)	Providing for the appointment of Anne D'Harnoncourt as a citizen regent of the Board of Regents of the Smithsonian Institution.	Pub. L. 104–83 (text) (PDF)
104-84	December 28, 1995	(No short title)	Providing for the appointment of Louis Gerstner as a citizen regent of the Board of Regents of the Smithsonian Institution.	Pub. L. 104–84 (text) (PDF)
104-85	December 28, 1995	(No short title)	To designate the Federal Courthouse in Decatur, Alabama, as the "Seybourn H. Lynne Federal Courthouse," and for other purposes.	Pub. L. 104–85 (text) (PDF)
104-86	December 28, 1995	(No short title)	To designate the United States Courthouse for the Eastern District of Virginia in Alexandria, Virginia, as the Albert V. Bryan United States Courthouse.	Pub. L. 104–86 (text) (PDF)
104-87	December 29, 1995	(No short title)	To extend for 4 years the period of applicability of enrollment mix requirement to certain health maintenance organizations providing services under Dayton Area Health Plan.	Pub. L. 104–87 (text) (PDF)
104-88	December 29, 1995	ICC Termination Act of 1995	To abolish the Interstate Commerce Commission, to amend subtitle IV of title 49, United States Code, to reform economic regulation of transportation, and for other purposes.	Pub. L. 104–88 (text) (PDF)
104-89	January 4, 1996	(No short title)	To extend authorities under the Middle East Peace Facilitation Act of 1994 until March 31, 1996, and for other purposes.	Pub. L. 104–89 (text) (PDF)
104-90	January 4, 1996	(No short title)	Making further continuing appropriations for the fiscal year 1996, and for other purposes.	Pub. L. 104–90 (text) (PDF)
104-91	January 6, 1996	(No short title)	To require the Secretary of Commerce to convey to the Commonwealth of Massachusetts the National Marine Fisheries Service laboratory located on Emerson Avenue in Gloucester, Massachusetts.	Pub. L. 104–91 (text) (PDF)
104-92	January 6, 1996	(No short title)	Making appropriations for certain activities for the fiscal year 1996, and for other purposes.	Pub. L. 104–92 (text) (PDF)
104-93	January 6, 1996	Intelligence Authorization Act for Fiscal Year 1996	To authorize appropriations for fiscal year 1996 for intelligence and intelligence-related activities of the United States Government, the Community Management Account, and the Central Intelligence Agency Retirement and Disability System, and for other purposes.	Pub. L. 104–93 (text) (PDF)
104-94	January 6, 1996	(No short title)	Making further continuing appropriations for the fiscal year 1996, and for other purposes	Pub. L. 104–94 (text) (PDF)
104-95	January 10, 1996	(No short title)	To amend title 4 of the United States Code to limit State taxation of certain pension income.	Pub. L. 104–95 (text) (PDF)
104-96	January 10, 1996	Smithsonian Institution Sesquicentennial Commemorative Coin Act of 1995	To require the Secretary of the Treasury to mint coins in commemoration of the sesquicentennial of the founding of the Smithsonian Institution.	Pub. L. 104–96 (text) (PDF)
104-97	January 11, 1996	(No short title)	To reauthorize the tied aid credit program of the Export-Import Bank of the United States, and to allow the Export-Import Bank to conduct a demonstration project.	Pub. L. 104–97 (text) (PDF)
104-98	January 16, 1996	Federal Trademark Dilution Act of 1995	To amend the Trademark Act of 1946 to make certain revisions relating to the protection of famous marks.	Pub. L. 104–98 (text) (PDF)
104-99	January 26, 1996	The Balanced Budget Downpayment Act, I	Making appropriations for fiscal year 1996 to make a down payment toward a balanced budget, and for other purposes.	Pub. L. 104–99 (text) (PDF)
104-100	February 1, 1996	(No short title)	To designate the United States Post Office building located at 24 Corliss Street, Providence, Rhode Island, as the "Harry Kizirian Post Office Building"	Pub. L. 104–100 (text) (PDF)
104-101	February 1, 1996	(No short title)	To designate the Federal building located at 1550 Dewey Avenue, Baker City, Oregon, as the "David J. Wheeler Federal Building"	Pub. L. 104–101 (text) (PDF)
104-102	February 6, 1996	Saddleback Mountain-Arizona Settlement Act of 1996	To provide for the transfer of certain lands to the Salt River Pima–Maricopa Indian Community and the city of Scottsdale, Arizona, and for other purposes.	Pub. L. 104–102 (text) (PDF)
104-103	February 8, 1996.	(No short title)	To guarantee the timely payment of social security benefits in March 1996.	Pub. L. 104–103 (text) (PDF)
104-104	February 8, 1996.	Telecommunications Act of 1996	To promote competition and reduce regulation in order to secure lower prices and higher quality services for American telecommunications consumers and encourage the rapid deployment of new telecommunications technologies.	Pub. L. 104–104 (text) (PDF)
104-105	February 10, 1996.	Farm Credit System Reform Act of 1996	To amend the Farm Credit Act of 1971 to provide regulatory relief, and for other purposes.	Pub. L. 104–105 (text) (PDF)
104-106	February 10, 1996.	National Defense Authorization Act for Fiscal Year 1996	To authorize appropriations for fiscal year 1996 for military activities of the Department of Defense, for military construction, and for defense activities of the Department of Energy, to prescribe personnel strengths for such fiscal year for the Armed Forces, to reform acquisition laws and information technology management of the Federal Government, and for other purposes.	Pub. L. 104–106 (text) (PDF)
104-107	February 12, 1996.	Foreign Operations, Export Financing, and Related Programs Appropriations Act, 1996	Making appropriations for foreign operations, export financing, and related programs for the fiscal year ending September 30, 1996, and for other purposes.	Pub. L. 104–107 (text) (PDF)
104-108	February 12, 1996	(No short title)	To designate the Federal building located at 1221 Nevin Avenue in Richmond, California, as the "Frank Hagel Federal Building."	Pub. L. 104–108 (text) (PDF)
104-109	February 12, 1996	(No short title)	To make certain technical corrections in laws relating to Native Americans, and for other purposes.	Pub. L. 104–109 (text) (PDF)
104-110	February 13, 1996	(No short title)	To amend title 38, United States Code, to extend the authority of the Secretary of Veterans Affairs to carry out certain programs and activities, to require certain reports from the Secretary of Veterans Affairs, and for other purposes.	Pub. L. 104–110 (text) (PDF)
104-111	February 13, 1996	(No short title)	To award a congressional gold medal to Ruth and Billy Graham.	Pub. L. 104–111 (text) (PDF)
104-112	March 5, 1996	(No short title)	To designate the United States courthouse located at 197 South Main Street in Wilkes-Barre, Pennsylvania, as the "Max Rosenn United States Courthouse".	Pub. L. 104–112 (text) (PDF)
104-113	March 7, 1996	National Technology Transfer and Advancement Act of 1995	To amend the Stevenson-Wydler Technology Innovation Act of 1980 with respect to inventions made under cooperative research and development agreements, and for other purposes.	Pub. L. 104–113 (text) (PDF)
104-114	March 12, 1996	Cuban Liberty and Democratic Solidarity (LIBERTAD) Act of 1996	To seek international sanctions against the Castro government in Cuba, to plan for support of a transition government leading to a democratically elected government in Cuba, and for other purposes.	Pub. L. 104–114 (text) (PDF)
104-115	March 12, 1996	(No short title)	To guarantee the continuing full investment of Social Security and other Federal funds in obligations of the United States.	Pub. L. 104–115 (text) (PDF)
104-116	March 15, 1996	(No short title)	Making further continuing appropriations for the fiscal year 1996, and for other purposes.	Pub. L. 104–116 (text) (PDF)
104-117	March 20, 1996	(No short title)	To provide that members of the Armed Forces performing services for the peacekeeping efforts in Bosnia and Herzegovina, Croatia, and Macedonia shall be entitled to tax benefits in the same manner as if such services were performed in a combat zone, and for other purposes.	Pub. L. 104–117 (text) (PDF)
104-118	March 22, 1996	(No short title)	Making further continuing appropriations for the fiscal year 1996, and for other purposes.	Pub. L. 104–118 (text) (PDF)
104-119	March 26, 1996	Land Disposal Program Flexibility Act of 1996	To amend the Solid Waste Disposal Act to make certain adjustments in the land disposal program to provide needed flexibility, and for other purposes.	Pub. L. 104–119 (text) (PDF)
104-120	March 28, 1996	Housing Opportunity Program Extension Act of 1996	To provide an extension for fiscal year 1996 for certain programs administered by the Secretary of Housing and Urban Development and the Secretary of Agriculture, and for other purposes.	Pub. L. 104–120 (text) (PDF)
104-121	March 29, 1996	Contract with America Advancement Act of 1996	To provide for enactment of the Senior Citizens' Right to Work Act of 1996, the Line Item Veto Act, and the Small Business Growth and Fairness Act of 1996, and to provide for a permanent increase in the public debt limit.	Pub. L. 104–121 (text) (PDF)
104-122	March 29, 1996	(No short title)	Making further continuing appropriations for the fiscal year 1996, and for other purposes.	Pub. L. 104–122 (text) (PDF)
104-123	April 1, 1996	Greens Creek Land Exchange Act of 1995	To provide for the exchange of lands within Admiralty Island National Monument, and for other purposes.	Pub. L. 104–123 (text) (PDF)
104-124	April 1, 1996	(No short title)	To amend the Federal Food, Drug, and Cosmetic Act to repeal the saccharin notice requirement.	Pub. L. 104–124 (text) (PDF)
104-125	April 1, 1996	(No short title)	To grant the consent of the Congress to certain additional powers conferred upon the Bi-State Development Agency by the States of Missouri and Illinois.	Pub. L. 104–125 (text) (PDF)
104-126	April 1, 1996	(No short title)	Granting the consent of Congress to the Vermont-New Hampshire Interstate Public Water Supply Compact.	Pub. L. 104–126 (text) (PDF)
104-127	April 4, 1996	Federal Agriculture Improvement and Reform Act of 1996	To modify the operation of certain agricultural programs.	Pub. L. 104–127 (text) (PDF)
104-128	April 9, 1996	Federal Tea Tasters Repeal Act of 1996	To eliminate the Board of Tea Experts by repealing the Tea Importation Act of 1897.	Pub. L. 104–128 (text) (PDF)
104-129	April 9, 1996	(No short title)	Waiving certain enrollment requirements with respect to two bills of the One Hundred Fourth Congress.	Pub. L. 104–129 (text) (PDF)
104-130	April 9, 1996	Line Item Veto Act	To give the President line item veto authority with respect to appropriations, new direct spending, and limited tax benefits.	Pub. L. 104–130 (text) (PDF)
104-131	April 24, 1996	(No short title)	Making further continuing appropriations for the fiscal year 1996, and for other purposes.	Pub. L. 104–131 (text) (PDF)
104-132	April 24, 1996	Antiterrorism and Effective Death Penalty Act of 1996	To deter terrorism, provide justice for victims, provide for an effective death penalty, and for other purposes.	Pub. L. 104–132 (text) (PDF)
104-133	April 25, 1996	(No short title)	To amend the Indian Self-Determination and Education Assistance Act to extend for two months the authority for promulgating regulations under the Act.	Pub. L. 104–133 (text) (PDF)
104-134	April 26, 1996	District of Columbia School Reform Act of 1995	Making appropriations for fiscal year 1996 to make a further downpayment toward a balanced budget, and for other purposes.	Pub. L. 104–134 (text) (PDF)
104-135	April 30, 1996	(No short title)	To designate the Federal Justice Building in Miami, Florida, as the "James Lawrence King Federal Justice Building".	Pub. L. 104–135 (text) (PDF)
104-136	April 30, 1996	(No short title)	To designate the Federal building and United States courthouse located at 125 Market Street in Youngstown, Ohio, as the "Thomas D. Lambros Federal Building and United States Courthouse".	Pub. L. 104–136 (text) (PDF)
104-137	April 30, 1996	(No short title)	To designate the United States Post Office-Courthouse located at South 6th and Rogers Avenue, Fort Smith, Arkansas, as the "Judge Isaac C. Parker Federal Building".	Pub. L. 104–137 (text) (PDF)
104-138	April 30, 1996	(No short title)	To designate the United States Customs Administrative Building at the Ysleta/Zaragosa Port of Entry located at 797 South Zaragosa Road in El Paso, Texas, as the "Timothy C. McCaghren Customs Administrative Building".	Pub. L. 104–138 (text) (PDF)
104-139	April 30, 1996	(No short title)	To redesignate the Federal building located at 345 Middlefield Road in Menlo Park, California, and known as the Earth Sciences and Library Building, as the "Vincent E. McKelvey Federal Building".	Pub. L. 104–139 (text) (PDF)
104-140	May 2, 1996	(No short title)	Making corrections to Pub. L. 104–134 (text) (PDF).	Pub. L. 104–140 (text) (PDF)
104-141	May 6, 1996	(No short title)	To amend section 326 of the Higher Education Act of 1965 to permit continued participation by Historically Black Graduate Professional Schools in the grant program authorized by that section.	Pub. L. 104–141 (text) (PDF)
104-142	May 13, 1996	Mercury-Containing and Rechargeable Battery Management Act	To phase out the use of mercury in batteries and provide for the efficient and cost-effective collection and recycling or proper disposal of used nickel cadmium batteries, small sealed lead-acid batteries, and certain other batteries, and for other purposes.	Pub. L. 104–142 (text) (PDF)
104-143	May 15, 1996	Trinity River Basin Fish and Wildlife Management Reauthorization Act of 1995	To amend the Trinity River Basin Fish and Wildlife Management Act of 1984, to extend for three years the availability of moneys for the restoration of fish and wildlife in the Trinity River, and for other purposes.	Pub. L. 104–143 (text) (PDF)
104-144	May 16, 1996	(No short title)	To grant the consent of Congress to an amendment of the Historic Chattahoochee Compact between the States of Alabama and Georgia.	Pub. L. 104–144 (text) (PDF)
104-145	May 17, 1996	Megan's Law	To amend the Violent Crime Control and Law Enforcement Act of 1994 to require the release of relevant information to protect the public from sexually violent offenders.	Pub. L. 104–145 (text) (PDF)
104-146	May 20, 1996	Ryan White CARE Act Amendments of 1996	An Act to amend the Public Health Service Act to revise and extend programs established pursuant to the Ryan White Comprehensive AIDS Resources Emergency Act of 1990.	Pub. L. 104–146 (text) (PDF)
104-147	May 24, 1996	(No short title)	To amend the Water Resources Research Act of 1984 to extend the authorizations of appropriations through fiscal year 2000, and for other purposes.	Pub. L. 104–147 (text) (PDF)
104-148	May 24, 1996	(No short title)	To authorize the Secretary of the Interior to acquire property in the town of East Hampton, Suffolk County, New York, for inclusion in the Amagansett National Wildlife Refuge.	Pub. L. 104–148 (text) (PDF)
104-149	May 29, 1996	Healthy Meals for Children Act	To amend the National School Lunch Act to provide greater flexibility to schools to meet the Dietary Guidelines for Americans under the school lunch and school breakfast programs.	Pub. L. 104–149 (text) (PDF)
104-150	June 3, 1996	Coastal Zone Protection Act of 1996	To reauthorize the Coastal Zone Management Act of 1972, and for other purposes.	Pub. L. 104–150 (text) (PDF)
104-151	July 1, 1996	(No short title)	To designate the United States courthouse in Washington, District of Columbia, as the "E. Barrett Prettyman United States Courthouse".	Pub. L. 104–151 (text) (PDF)
104-152	July 2, 1996	Anti-Car Theft Improvements Act of 1996	To amend the anti-car theft provisions of title 49, United States Code, to increase the utility of motor vehicle title information to State and Federal law enforcement officials, and for other purposes.	Pub. L. 104–152 (text) (PDF)
104-153	July 2, 1996	Anticounterfeiting Consumer Protection Act of 1996	To control and prevent commercial counterfeiting, and for other purposes.	Pub. L. 104–153 (text) (PDF)
104-154	July 2, 1996	(No short title)	To designate the bridge, estimated to be completed in the year 2000, that replaces the bridge on Missouri highway 74 spanning from East Cape Girardeau, Illinois, to Cape Girardeau, Missouri, as the "Bill Emerson Memorial Bridge", and for other purposes.	Pub. L. 104–154 (text) (PDF)
104-155	July 3, 1996	Church Arson Prevention Act of 1996	To amend title 18, United States Code, to clarify the Federal jurisdiction over offenses relating to damage to religious property.	Pub. L. 104–155 (text) (PDF)
104-156	July 5, 1996	Single Audit Act Amendments of 1996	To streamline and improve the effectiveness of chapter 75 of title 31, United States Code (commonly referred to as the "Single Audit Act").	Pub. L. 104–156 (text) (PDF)
104-157	July 9, 1996	(No short title)	To designate the United States Post Office building located at 102 South McLean, Lincoln, Illinois, as the "Edward Madigan Post Office Building".	Pub. L. 104–157 (text) (PDF)
104-158	July 9, 1996	(No short title)	To provide for the exchange of certain lands in Gilpin County, Colorado.	Pub. L. 104–158 (text) (PDF)
104-159	July 9, 1996	(No short title)	To provide that the United States Post Office building that is to be located at 7436 South Exchange Avenue, Chicago, Illinois, shall be known and designated as the "Charles A. Hayes Post Office Building".	Pub. L. 104–159 (text) (PDF)
104-160	July 9, 1996	(No short title)	To designate the Federal building and United States courthouse located at 235 North Washington Avenue in Scranton, Pennsylvania, as the "William J. Nealon Federal Building and United States Courthouse".	Pub. L. 104–160 (text) (PDF)
104-161	July 18, 1996	(No short title)	To provide for the distribution within the United States of the United States Information Agency film entitled "Fragile Ring of Life".	Pub. L. 104–161 (text) (PDF)
104-162	July 18, 1996	(No short title)	To authorize the extension of nondiscriminatory treatment (most-favored nation treatment) to the products of Bulgaria.	Pub. L. 104–162 (text) (PDF)
104-163	July 19, 1996	National Children's Island Act of 1995	To require the transfer of title to the District of Columbia of certain real property in Anacostia Park to facilitate the construction of National Children's Island, a cultural, educational, and family-oriented park.	Pub. L. 104–163 (text) (PDF)
104-164	July 21, 1996	(No short title)	To amend the Foreign Assistance Act of 1961 and the Arms Export Control Act to make improvements to certain defense and security assistance provisions under those Acts, to authorize the transfer of naval vessels to certain foreign countries, and for other purposes.	Pub. L. 104–164 (text) (PDF)
104-165	July 24, 1996	(No short title)	To authorize the Secretary of Agriculture to convey lands to the city of Rolla, Missouri.	Pub. L. 104–165 (text) (PDF)
104-166	July 29, 1996	(No short title)	To amend the Public Health Service Act to provide for the conduct of expanded studies and the establishment of innovative programs with respect to traumatic brain injury, and for other purposes.	Pub. L. 104–166 (text) (PDF)
104-167	July 29, 1996	(No short title)	Entitled the "Mollie Beattie Wilderness Area Act".	Pub. L. 104–167 (text) (PDF)
104-168	July 30, 1996	Taxpayer Bill of Rights 2	To amend the Internal Revenue Code of 1986 to provide for increased taxpayer protections.	Pub. L. 104–168 (text) (PDF)
104-169	August 3, 1996	National Gambling Impact Study Commission Act	To create the National Gambling Impact and Policy Commission.	Pub. L. 104–169 (text) (PDF)
104-170	August 3, 1996	Food Quality Protection Act of 1996	To amend the Federal Insecticide, Fungicide, and Rodenticide Act and the Federal Food, Drug, and Cosmetic Act, and for other purposes.	Pub. L. 104–170 (text) (PDF)
104-171	August 3, 1996	(No short title)	To authorize the extension of nondiscriminatory treatment (most-favored- nation treatment) to the products of Romania.	Pub. L. 104–171 (text) (PDF)
104-172	August 5, 1996	Iran and Libya Sanctions Act of 1996	To impose sanctions on persons making certain investments directly and significantly contributing to the enhancement of the ability of Iran or Libya to develop its petroleum resources, and on persons exporting certain items that enhance Libya's weapons or aviation capabilities or enhance Libya's ability to develop its petroleum resources, and for other purposes.	Pub. L. 104–172 (text) (PDF)
104-173	August 6, 1996	(No short title)	To provide for the extension of certain hydroelectric projects located in the State of West Virginia.	Pub. L. 104–173 (text) (PDF)
104-174	August 6, 1996	(No short title)	To authorize minors who are under the child labor provisions of the Fair Labor Standards Act of 1938 and who are under 18 years of age to load materials into balers and compactors that meet appropriate American National Standards Institute design safety standards.	Pub. L. 104–174 (text) (PDF)
104-175	August 6, 1996	(No short title)	To authorize a circuit judge who has taken part in an in banc hearing of a case to continue to participate in that case after taking senior status, and for other purposes.	Pub. L. 104–175 (text) (PDF)
104-176	August 6, 1996	(No short title)	Granting the consent of Congress to the compact to provide for joint natural resource management and enforcement of laws and regulations pertaining to natural resources and boating at the Jennings Randolph Lake Project lying in Garrett County, Maryland and Mineral County, West Virginia, entered into between the States of West Virginia and Maryland.	Pub. L. 104–176 (text) (PDF)
104-177	August 6, 1996	Federal Employee Representation Improvement Act of 1996	To amend title 18 of the United States Code to allow members of employee associations to represent their views before the United States Government.	Pub. L. 104–177 (text) (PDF)
104-178	August 6, 1996	(No short title)	To amend title 18, United States Code, to repeal the provision relating to Federal employees contracting or trading with Indians.	Pub. L. 104–178 (text) (PDF)
104-179	August 6, 1996	Office of Government Ethics Authorization Act of 1996	To amend the Ethics in Government Act of 1978, to extend the authorization of appropriations for the Office of Government Ethics for 3 years, and for other purposes.	Pub. L. 104–179 (text) (PDF)
104-180	August 6, 1996	Agriculture, Rural Development, Food and Drug Administration, and Related Agencies Appropriations Act, 1997	Making appropriations for Agriculture, Rural Development, Food and Drug Administration, and Related Agencies programs for the fiscal year ending September 30, 1997, and for other purposes.	Pub. L. 104–180 (text) (PDF)
104-181	August 6, 1996	(No short title)	Granting the consent of Congress to the Mutual Aid Agreement between the city of Bristol, Virginia, and the city of Bristol, Tennessee.	Pub. L. 104–181 (text) (PDF)
104-182	August 6, 1996	Safe Drinking Water Act Amendments of 1996	To reauthorize and amend title XIV of the Public Health Service Act (commonly known as the "Safe Drinking Water Act"), and for other purposes.	Pub. L. 104–182 (text) (PDF)
104-183	August 6, 1996	Developmental Disabilities Assistance and Bill of Rights Act Amendments of 1996	To amend the Developmental Disabilities Assistance and Bill of Rights Act to extend the Act, and for other purposes.	Pub. L. 104–183 (text) (PDF)
104-184	August 6, 1996	District of Columbia Water and Sewer Authority Act of 1996	To amend the District of Columbia Self-Government and Governmental Reorganization Act to permit the Council of the District of Columbia to authorize the issuance of revenue bonds with respect to water and sewer facilities, and for other purposes.	Pub. L. 104–184 (text) (PDF)
104-185	August 13, 1996	Federal Oil and Gas Royalty Simplification and Fairness Act of 1996	To improve the management of royalties from Federal and Outer Continental Shelf oil and gas leases, and for other purposes.	Pub. L. 104–185 (text) (PDF)
104-186	August 20, 1996	House of Representatives Administrative Reform Technical Corrections Act	To provide for a representational allowance for Members of the House of Representatives, to make technical and conforming changes to sundry provisions of law in consequence of administrative reforms in the House of Representatives, and for other purposes.	Pub. L. 104–186 (text) (PDF)
104-187	August 20, 1996	(No short title)	To redesignate the United States Post Office building located at 245 Centereach Mall on Middle Country Road in Centereach, New York, as the "Rose Y. Caracappa United States Post Office Building".	Pub. L. 104–187 (text) (PDF)
104-188	August 20, 1996	Small Business Job Protection Act of 1996	To provide tax relief for small businesses, to protect jobs, to create opportunities, to increase the take home pay of workers, to amend the Portal-to-Portal Act of 1947 relating to the payment of wages to employees who use employer owned vehicles, and to amend the Fair Labor Standards Act of 1938 to increase the minimum wage rate and to prevent job loss by providing flexibility to employers in complying with minimum wage and overtime requirements under that Act.	Pub. L. 104–188 (text) (PDF)
104-189	August 20, 1996	(No short title)	To redesignate the Dunning Post Office in Chicago, Illinois, as the "Roger P. McAuliffe Post Office".	Pub. L. 104–189 (text) (PDF)
104-190	August 20, 1996	(No short title)	To authorize the Agency for International Development to offer voluntary separation incentive payments to employees of that agency.	Pub. L. 104–190 (text) (PDF)
104-191	August 21, 1996	Health Insurance Portability and Accountability Act of 1996	To amend the Internal Revenue Code of 1986 to improve portability and continuity of health insurance coverage in the group and individual markets, to combat waste, fraud, and abuse in health insurance and health care delivery, to promote the use of medical savings accounts, to improve access to long-term care services and coverage, to simplify the administration of health insurance, and for other purposes.	Pub. L. 104–191 (text) (PDF)
104-192	August 21, 1996	War Crimes Act of 1996	To amend title 18, United States Code, to carry out the international obligations of the United States under the Geneva Conventions to provide criminal penalties for certain war crimes.	Pub. L. 104–192 (text) (PDF)
104-193	August 22, 1996	Personal Responsibility and Work Opportunity Reconciliation Act of 1996	To provide for reconciliation pursuant to section 201(a)(1) of the concurrent resolution on the budget for fiscal year 1997.	Pub. L. 104–193 (text) (PDF)
104-194	September 9, 1996	District of Columbia Appropriations Act, 1997	Making appropriations for the government of the District of Columbia and other activities chargeable in whole or in part against the revenues of said District for the fiscal year ending September 30, 1997, and for other purposes.	Pub. L. 104–194 (text) (PDF)
104-195	September 16, 1996	(No short title)	To amend the Impact Aid program to provide for a hold-harmless with respect to amounts for payments relating to the Federal acquisition of real property, and for other purposes.	Pub. L. 104–195 (text) (PDF)
104-196	September 16, 1996	Military Construction Appropriations Act, 1997	Making appropriations for military construction, family housing, and base realignment and closure for the Department of Defense for the fiscal year ending September 30, 1997, and for other purposes.	Pub. L. 104–196 (text) (PDF)
104-197	September 16, 1996	Legislative Branch Appropriations Act, 1997	Making appropriations for the Legislative Branch for the fiscal year ending September 30, 1997, and for other purposes.	Pub. L. 104–197 (text) (PDF)
104-198	September 18, 1996	(No short title)	To confer jurisdiction on the United States Court of Federal Claims with respect to land claims of Pueblo of Isleta Indian Tribe.	Pub. L. 104–198 (text) (PDF)
104-199	September 21, 1996	Defense of Marriage Act	To define and protect the institution of marriage.	Pub. L. 104–199 (text) (PDF)
104-200	September 22, 1996	(No short title)	To make technical corrections in the Federal Oil and Gas Royalty Management Act of 1982.	Pub. L. 104–200 (text) (PDF)
104-201	September 23, 1996	National Defense Authorization Act for Fiscal Year 1997	To authorize appropriations for fiscal year 1997 for military activities of the Department of Defense, for military construction, and for defense activities of the Department of Energy, to prescribe personnel strengths for such fiscal year for the Armed Forces, and for other purposes.	Pub. L. 104–201 (text) (PDF)
104-202	September 24, 1996	(No short title)	To name the Department of Veterans Affairs medical center in Jackson, Mississippi, as the "G.V. (Sonny) Montgomery Department of Veterans Affairs Medical Center".	Pub. L. 104–202 (text) (PDF)
104-203	September 25, 1996	(No short title)	To extend nondiscriminatory treatment (most-favored-nation treatment) to the products of Cambodia, and for other purposes.	Pub. L. 104–203 (text) (PDF)
104-204	September 26, 1996	Mental Health Parity Act	Making appropriations for the Departments of Veterans Affairs and Housing and Urban Development, and for sundry independent agencies, boards, commissions, corporations, and offices for the fiscal year ending September 30, 1997, and for other purposes.	Pub. L. 104–204 (text) (PDF)
104-205	September 30, 1996	Department of Transportation and Related Agencies Appropriations Act, 1997	Making appropriations for the Department of Transportation and related agencies for the fiscal year ending September 30, 1997, and for other purposes.	Pub. L. 104–205 (text) (PDF)
104-206	September 30, 1996	Energy and Water Development Appropriations Act, 1997	Making appropriations for energy and water development for the fiscal year ending September 30, 1997, and for other purposes.	Pub. L. 104–206 (text) (PDF)
104-207	September 30, 1996	(No short title)	Waiving certain enrollment requirements with respect to any bill or joint resolution of the One Hundred Fourth Congress making general or continuing appropriations for fiscal year 1997.	Pub. L. 104–207 (text) (PDF)
104-208	September 30, 1996	Omnibus Consolidated Appropriations Act, 1997; Domestic Violence Offender Gun Ban; Child Pornography Prevention Act of 1996; Clinger-Cohen Act of 1996; Illegal Immigration Reform and Immigrant Responsibility Act of 1996; Library Services and Technology Act	Making omnibus consolidated appropriations for the fiscal year ending September 30, 1997, and for other purposes.	Pub. L. 104–208 (text) (PDF)
104-209	October 1, 1996	(No short title)	To authorize the Secretary of the Interior to acquire certain interests in Waihee Marsh for inclusion in the Oahu National Wildlife Refuge Complex.	Pub. L. 104–209 (text) (PDF)
104-210	October 1, 1996	(No short title)	To encourage the donation of food and grocery products to nonprofit organizations for distribution to needy individuals by giving the Model Good Samaritan Food Donation Act the full force and effect of law.	Pub. L. 104–210 (text) (PDF)
104-211	October 1, 1996	(No short title)	To amend Pub. L. 103–93 to provide additional lands within the State of Utah for the Goshute Indian Reservation, and for other purposes.	Pub. L. 104–211 (text) (PDF)
104-212	October 1, 1996	(No short title)	To revise the boundary of the North Platte National Wildlife Refuge, to expand the Pettaquamscutt Cove National Wildlife Refuge, and for other purposes.	Pub. L. 104–212 (text) (PDF)
104-213	October 1, 1996	Carbon Hill National Fish Hatchery Conveyance Act	To direct the Secretary of the Interior to convey the Carbon Hill National Fish Hatchery to the State of Alabama.	Pub. L. 104–213 (text) (PDF)
104-214	October 1, 1996	(No short title)	To amend title 18, United States Code, with respect to witness retaliation, witness tampering and jury tampering.	Pub. L. 104–214 (text) (PDF)
104-215	October 1, 1996	Crawford National Fish Hatchery Conveyance Act	To direct the Secretary of the Interior to convey the Crawford National Fish Hatchery to the city of Crawford, Nebraska.	Pub. L. 104–215 (text) (PDF)
104-216	October 1, 1996	Federal Trade Commission Reauthorization Act of 1996	To amend the Federal Trade Commission Act to authorize appropriations for the Federal Trade Commission.	Pub. L. 104–216 (text) (PDF)
104-217	October 1, 1996	Carjacking Correction Act of 1996	To amend title 18, United States Code, to clarify the intent of Congress with respect to the Federal carjacking prohibition.	Pub. L. 104–217 (text) (PDF)
104-218	October 1, 1996	(No short title)	To confer honorary citizenship of the United States on Agnes Gonxha Bojaxhiu, also known as Mother Teresa.	Pub. L. 104–218 (text) (PDF)
104-219	October 1, 1996	(No short title)	To clarify the rules governing removal of cases to Federal court, and for other purposes.	Pub. L. 104–219 (text) (PDF)
104-220	October 1, 1996	(No short title)	To repeal a redundant venue provision, and for other purposes.	Pub. L. 104–220 (text) (PDF)
104-221	October 1, 1996	(No short title)	To designate the United States Courthouse under construction at 1030 Southwest 3rd Avenue, Portland, Oregon, as the "Mark O. Hatfield United States Courthouse", and for other purposes.	Pub. L. 104–221 (text) (PDF)
104-222	October 1, 1996	(No short title)	To authorize construction of the Smithsonian Institution National Air and Space Museum Dulles Center at Washington Dulles International Airport, and for other purposes.	Pub. L. 104–222 (text) (PDF)
104-223	October 1, 1996	Crow Creek Sioux Tribe Infrastructure Development Trust Fund Act of 1996	To provide for certain benefits of the Pick-Sloan Missouri River basin program to the Crow Creek Sioux Tribe, and for other purposes.	Pub. L. 104–223 (text) (PDF)
104-224	October 2, 1996	(No short title)	To repeal an unnecessary medical device reporting requirement.	Pub. L. 104–224 (text) (PDF)
104-225	October 2, 1996	(No short title)	To designate the Federal building located at the corner of Patton Avenue and Otis Street, and the United States courthouse located on Otis Street, in Asheville, North Carolina, as the "Veach-Baley Federal Complex".	Pub. L. 104–225 (text) (PDF)
104-226	October 2, 1996	(No short title)	To repeal the Medicare and Medicaid Coverage Data Bank.	Pub. L. 104–226 (text) (PDF)
104-227	October 2, 1996	Antarctic Science, Tourism, and Conservation Act of 1996	To implement the Protocol on Environmental Protection to the Antarctic Treaty.	Pub. L. 104–227 (text) (PDF)
104-228	October 2, 1996	(No short title)	To designate the Federal building located at 1655 Woodson Road in Overland, Missouri, as the "Sammy L. Davis Federal Building".	Pub. L. 104–228 (text) (PDF)
104-229	October 2, 1996	(No short title)	To designate the Federal building and United States courthouse to be constructed at a site on 18th Street between Dodge and Douglas Streets in Omaha, Nebraska, as the "Roman L. Hruska Federal Building and United States Courthouse".	Pub. L. 104–229 (text) (PDF)
104-230	October 2, 1996	(No short title)	To designate the United States courthouse under construction at 611 North Florida Avenue in Tampa, Florida, as the "Sam M. Gibbons United States Courthouse".	Pub. L. 104–230 (text) (PDF)
104-231	October 2, 1996	Electronic Freedom of Information Act Amendments of 1996	To amend section 552 of title 5, United States Code, popularly known as the Freedom of Information Act, to provide for public access to information in an electronic format, and for other purposes.	Pub. L. 104–231 (text) (PDF)
104-232	October 2, 1996	(No short title)	To provide for the extension of the Parole Commission to oversee cases of prisoners sentenced under prior law, to reduce the size of the Parole Commission, and for other purposes.	Pub. L. 104–232 (text) (PDF)
104-233	October 2, 1996	(No short title)	To reauthorize the Indian Environmental General Assistance Program Act of 1992, and for other purposes.	Pub. L. 104–233 (text) (PDF)
104-234	October 2, 1996	(No short title)	To amend the United States-Israel Free Trade Area Implementation Act of 1985 to provide the President with additional proclamation authority with respect to articles of the West Bank or Gaza Strip or a qualifying industrial zone.	Pub. L. 104–234 (text) (PDF)
104-235	October 3, 1996	Child Abuse Prevention and Treatment Act Amendments of 1996	To modify and reauthorize the Child Abuse Prevention and Treatment Act, and for other purposes.	Pub. L. 104–235 (text) (PDF)
104-236	October 3, 1996	Pam Lychner Sexual Offender Tracking and Identification Act of 1996	To provide for the nationwide tracking of convicted sexual predators, and for other purposes.	Pub. L. 104–236 (text) (PDF)
104-237	October 3, 1996	Comprehensive Methamphetamine Control Act of 1996	To prevent the illegal manufacturing and use of methamphetamine.	Pub. L. 104–237 (text) (PDF)
104-238	October 3, 1996	Federal Law Enforcement Dependents Assistance Act of 1996	To provide educational assistance to the dependents of Federal law enforcement officials who are killed or disabled in the performance of their duties.	Pub. L. 104–238 (text) (PDF)
104-239	October 8, 1996	Maritime Security Act of 1996	To amend the Merchant Marine Act, 1936 to revitalize the United States- flag merchant marine, and for other purposes.	Pub. L. 104–239 (text) (PDF)
104-240	October 8, 1996	(No short title)	To permit a county-operated health insuring organization to qualify as an organization exempt from certain requirements otherwise applicable to health insuring organizations under the Medicaid program notwithstanding that the organization enrolls Medicaid beneficiaries residing in another county.	Pub. L. 104–240 (text) (PDF)
104-241	October 9, 1996	(No short title)	To extend the deadline under the Small Business Act applicable to the construction of three hydroelectric projects in the State of Arkansas.	Pub. L. 104–241 (text) (PDF)
104-242	October 9, 1996	(No short title)	To extend the time for construction of certain FERC licensed hydro projects.	Pub. L. 104–242 (text) (PDF)
104-243	October 9, 1996	(No short title)	To extend the deadline under the Small Business Act applicable to the construction of a hydroelectric project in the State of Ohio.	Pub. L. 104–243 (text) (PDF)
104-244	October 9, 1996	(No short title)	To authorize extension of time limitation for a FERC-issued hydroelectric license.	Pub. L. 104–244 (text) (PDF)
104-245	October 9, 1996	(No short title)	To reinstate the permit for, and extend the deadline under the Small Business Act applicable to the construction of, a hydroelectric project in Oregon, and for other purposes.	Pub. L. 104–245 (text) (PDF)
104-246	October 9, 1996	(No short title)	To provide for the extension of a hydroelectric project located in the State of West Virginia.	Pub. L. 104–246 (text) (PDF)
104-247	October 9, 1996	(No short title)	To authorize the extension of time limitation for the FERC-issued hydroelectric license for the Mt. Hope Waterpower Project.	Pub. L. 104–247 (text) (PDF)
104-248	October 9, 1996	(No short title)	To amend title XIX of the Social Security Act to make certain technical corrections relating to physicians' services.	Pub. L. 104–248 (text) (PDF)
104-249	October 9, 1996	(No short title)	To extend the deadline under the Small Business Act applicable to the construction of a hydroelectric project in Kentucky, and for other purposes.	Pub. L. 104–249 (text) (PDF)
104-250	October 9, 1996	Animal Drug Availability Act 1996	To amend the Federal Food, Drug, and Cosmetic Act to provide for improvements in the process of approving and using animal drugs, and for other purposes.	Pub. L. 104–250 (text) (PDF)
104-251	October 9, 1996	Railroad Unemployment Insurance Amendments Act of 1996	To amend the Railroad Unemployment Insurance Act to reduce the waiting period for benefits payable under that Act, and for other purposes.	Pub. L. 104–251 (text) (PDF)
104-252	October 9, 1996	(No short title)	To extend the deadline for commencement of construction of a hydroelectric project in the State of Illinois.	Pub. L. 104–252 (text) (PDF)
104-253	October 9, 1996	(No short title)	To increase the amount authorized to be appropriated to the Department of the Interior for the Tensas River National Wildlife Refuge, and for other purposes.	Pub. L. 104–253 (text) (PDF)
104-254	October 9, 1996	(No short title)	To extend the deadline under the Small Business Act applicable to the construction of certain hydroelectric projects in the State of Pennsylvania.	Pub. L. 104–254 (text) (PDF)
104-255	October 9, 1996	(No short title)	To designate the building located at 8302 FM 327, Elmendorf, Texas, which houses operations of the United States Postal Service, as the "Amos F. Longoria Post Office Building".	Pub. L. 104–255 (text) (PDF)
104-256	October 9, 1996	(No short title)	To extend the deadline under the Small Business Act applicable to the construction of 2 hydroelectric projects in North Carolina, and for other purposes.	Pub. L. 104–256 (text) (PDF)
104-257	October 9, 1996	(No short title)	To reinstate the license for, and extend the deadline under the Small Business Act applicable to the construction of, a hydroelectric project in Ohio, and for other purposes.	Pub. L. 104–257 (text) (PDF)
104-258	October 9, 1996	(No short title)	To extend the deadline for commencement of construction of a hydroelectric project in the State of Kentucky.	Pub. L. 104–258 (text) (PDF)
104-259	October 9, 1996	(No short title)	To extend the authorization of the Uranium Mill Tailings Radiation Control Act of 1978, and for other purposes.	Pub. L. 104–259 (text) (PDF)
104-260	October 9, 1996	(No short title)	To amend the Clean Air Act to provide that traffic signal synchronization projects are exempt from certain requirements of Environmental Protection Agency Rules.	Pub. L. 104–260 (text) (PDF)
104-261	October 9, 1996	(No short title)	To accept the request of the Prairie Island Indian Community to revoke their charter of incorporation issued under the Indian Reorganization Act.	Pub. L. 104–261 (text) (PDF)
104-262	October 9, 1996	Veterans' Health Care Eligibility Reform Act of 1996	To amend title 38, United States Code, to reform eligibility for health care provided by the Department of Veterans Affairs, to authorize major medical facility construction projects for the department, to improve administration of health care by the department, and for other purposes.	Pub. L. 104–262 (text) (PDF)
104-263	October 9, 1996	Veterans' Compensation Cost-of-Living Adjustment Act of 1996	To increase, effective as of December 1, 1996, the rates of disability compensation for veterans with service-connected disabilities and the rates of dependency and indemnity compensation for survivors of certain service-connected disabled veterans, and for other purposes.	Pub. L. 104–263 (text) (PDF)
104-264	October 9, 1996	Federal Aviation Reauthorization Act of 1996	To amend title 49, United States Code, to reauthorize programs of the Federal Aviation Administration, and for other purposes.	Pub. L. 104–264 (text) (PDF)
104-265	October 9, 1996	Walhalla National Fish Hatchery Conveyance Act	To direct the Secretary of the Interior to convey the Walhalla National Fish Hatchery to the State of South Carolina, and for other purposes.	Pub. L. 104–265 (text) (PDF)
104-266	October 9, 1996	Reclamation Recycling and Water Conservation Act of 1996	To make amendments to the Reclamation Wastewater and Groundwater Study and Facilities Act, and for other purposes.	Pub. L. 104–266 (text) (PDF)
104-267	October 9, 1996	(No short title)	To waive temporarily the Medicaid enrollment composition rule for certain health maintenance organizations.	Pub. L. 104–267 (text) (PDF)
104-268	October 9, 1996	(No short title)	To designate the United States Post Office building located at 351 West Washington Street in Camden, Arkansas, as the "David H. Pryor Post Office Building".	Pub. L. 104–268 (text) (PDF)
104-269	October 9, 1996	(No short title)	To make available certain Voice of America and Radio Marti multilingual computer readable text and voice recordings.	Pub. L. 104–269 (text) (PDF)
104-270	October 9, 1996	(No short title)	To provide for a study of the recommendations of the Joint Federal-State Commission on Policies and Programs Affecting Alaska Natives.	Pub. L. 104–270 (text) (PDF)
104-271	October 9, 1996	Hydrogen Future Act of 1996	To authorize the hydrogen research, development, and demonstration programs of the Department of Energy, and for other purposes.	Pub. L. 104–271 (text) (PDF)
104-272	October 9, 1996	Professional Boxing Safety Act of 1996	To provide for the safety of journeymen boxers, and for other purposes.	Pub. L. 104–272 (text) (PDF)
104-273	October 9, 1996	Helium Privatization Act of 1996	To amend the Helium Act to authorize the Secretary to enter into agreements with private parties for the recovery and disposal of helium on Federal lands, and for other purposes.	Pub. L. 104–273 (text) (PDF)
104-274	October 9, 1996	(No short title)	To authorize appropriations for the National Historical Publications and Records Commission for fiscal years 1998, 1999, 2000, and 2001.	Pub. L. 104–274 (text) (PDF)
104-275	October 9, 1996	Veterans' Benefits Improvements Act of 1996	To amend title 38, United States Code, to improve the benefits programs administered by the Secretary of Veterans Affairs, to provide for a study of the Federal programs for veterans, and for other purposes.	Pub. L. 104–275 (text) (PDF)
104-276	October 9, 1996	(No short title)	To direct the Secretary of the Interior to convey certain property containing a fish and wildlife facility to the State of Wyoming, and for other purposes.	Pub. L. 104–276 (text) (PDF)
104-277	October 9, 1996	(No short title)	To provide that the United States Post Office and Courthouse building located at 9 East Broad Street, Cookeville, Tennessee, shall be known and designated as the "L. Clure Morton United States Post Office and Courthouse".	Pub. L. 104–277 (text) (PDF)
104-278	October 9, 1996	National Museum of the American Indian Act Amendments of 1996	To amend the National Museum of the American Indian Act to make improvements in the Act, and for other purposes.	Pub. L. 104–278 (text) (PDF)
104-279	October 9, 1996	(No short title)	To authorize the Capitol Guide Service to accept voluntary services.	Pub. L. 104–279 (text) (PDF)
104-280	October 9, 1996	(No short title)	To provide for the extension of certain authority for the Marshal of the Supreme Court and the Supreme Court Police.	Pub. L. 104–280 (text) (PDF)
104-281	October 9, 1996	(No short title)	To designate the United States Post Office building located in Brewer, Maine, as the "Joshua Lawrence Chamberlain Post Office Building", and for other purposes.	Pub. L. 104–281 (text) (PDF)
104-282	October 9, 1996	(No short title)	To commend Operation Sail for its advancement of brotherhood among nations, its continuing commemoration of the history of the United States, and its nurturing of young cadets through training in seamanship.	Pub. L. 104–282 (text) (PDF)
104-283	October 11, 1996	National Marine Sanctuaries Preservation Act	To reauthorize the National Marine Sanctuaries Act, and for other purposes.	Pub. L. 104–283 (text) (PDF)
104-284	October 11, 1996	Propane Education and Research Act of 1996	To authorize and facilitate a program to enhance safety, training, research and development, and safety education in the propane gas industry for the benefit of propane consumers and the public, and for other purposes.	Pub. L. 104–284 (text) (PDF)
104-285	October 11, 1996	(No short title)	To reauthorize the National Film Preservation Board, and for other purposes.	Pub. L. 104–285 (text) (PDF)
104-286	October 11, 1996	(No short title)	To amend the Central Utah Project Completion Act to direct the Secretary of the Interior to allow for prepayment of repayment contracts between the United States and the Central Utah Water Conservancy District dated December 28, 1965, and November 26, 1985, and for other purposes.	Pub. L. 104–286 (text) (PDF)
104-287	October 11, 1996	(No short title)	To codify without substantive change laws related to transportation and to improve the United States Code.	Pub. L. 104–287 (text) (PDF)
104-288	October 11, 1996	United States National Tourism Organization Act of 1996	To establish the National Tourism Board and the National Tourism Organization to promote international travel and tourism to the United States.	Pub. L. 104–288 (text) (PDF)
104-289	October 11, 1996	Savings in Construction Act of 1996	To provide for appropriate implementation of the Metric Conversion Act of 1975 in Federal construction projects, and for other purposes.	Pub. L. 104–289 (text) (PDF)
104-290	October 11, 1996	National Securities Markets Improvement Act of 1996	To amend the Federal securities laws in order to promote efficiency and capital formation in the financial markets, and to amend the Investment Company Act of 1940 to promote more efficient management of mutual funds, protect investors, and provide more effective and less burdensome regulation.	Pub. L. 104–290 (text) (PDF)
104-291	October 11, 1996	(No short title)	To amend title 49, United States Code, to authorize appropriations for fiscal years 1997, 1998, and 1999 for the National Transportation Safety Board, and for other purposes.	Pub. L. 104–291 (text) (PDF)
104-292	October 11, 1996	False Statements Accountability Act of 1996	To amend title 18, United States Code, with respect to the crime of false statement in a Government matter.	Pub. L. 104–292 (text) (PDF)
104-293	October 11, 1996	Intelligence Authorization Act for Fiscal Year 1997	To authorize appropriations for fiscal year 1997 for intelligence and intelligence-related activities of the United States Government, the Community Management Account, and the Central Intelligence Agency Retirement and Disability System, and for other purposes.	Pub. L. 104–293 (text) (PDF)
104-294	October 11, 1996	Economic Espionage Act of 1996	To amend title 18, United States Code, to protect proprietary economic information, and for other purposes.	Pub. L. 104–294 (text) (PDF)
104-295	October 11, 1996	Miscellaneous Trade and Technical Corrections Act of 1996	To make technical corrections and miscellaneous amendments to trade laws.	Pub. L. 104–295 (text) (PDF)
104-296	October 11, 1996	(No short title)	Appointing the day for the convening of the first session of the One Hundred Fifth Congress and the day for the counting in Congress of the electoral votes for president and Vice President cast in December 1996.	Pub. L. 104–296 (text) (PDF)
104-297	October 11, 1996	Sustainable Fisheries Act	To amend the Magnuson Fishery Conservation and Management Act to authorize appropriations, to provide for sustainable fisheries, and for other purposes.	Pub. L. 104–297 (text) (PDF)
104-298	October 11, 1996	Water Desalination Act of 1996	To authorize the Secretary of the Interior to conduct studies regarding the desalination of water and water reuse, and for other purposes.	Pub. L. 104–298 (text) (PDF)
104-299	October 11, 1996	Health Centers Consolidation Act of 1996	To amend title III of the Public Health Service Act to consolidate and reauthorize provisions relating to health centers, and for other purposes.	Pub. L. 104–299 (text) (PDF)
104-300	October 11, 1996	Fort Pect Rural County Water Supply System Act of 1996	To authorize the construction of the Fort Peck Rural County Water Supply System, to authorize assistance to the Fort Peck Rural County Water District, Inc., a nonprofit corporation, for the planning, design, and construction of the water supply system, and for other purposes.	Pub. L. 104–300 (text) (PDF)
104-301	October 11, 1996	Navajo-Hopi Land Dispute Settlement Act of 1996	To provide for the settlement of the Navajo-Hopi land dispute, and for other purposes.	Pub. L. 104–301 (text) (PDF)
104-302	October 11, 1996	(No short title)	To extend the authorized period of stay within the United States for certain nurses.	Pub. L. 104–302 (text) (PDF)
104-303	October 12, 1996	Water Resources Development Act of 1996	To provide for the conservation and development of water and related resources, to authorize the Secretary of the Army to construct various projects for improvements to rivers and harbors of the United States, and for other purposes.	Pub. L. 104–303 (text) (PDF)
104-304	October 12, 1996	Accountable Pipeline Safety and Partnership Act of 1996	To reduce risk to public safety and the environment associated with pipeline transportation of natural gas and hazardous liquids, and for other purposes.	Pub. L. 104–304 (text) (PDF)
104-305	October 13, 1996	Drug-Induced Rape Prevention and Punishment Act of 1996	To combat drug-facilitated crimes of violence, including sexual assaults.	Pub. L. 104–305 (text) (PDF)
104-306	October 14, 1996	(No short title)	To extend certain programs under the Energy Policy and Conservation Act through September 30, 1997.	Pub. L. 104–306 (text) (PDF)
104-307	October 14, 1996	Wildfire Suppressing Aircraft Transfer Act of 1996	To authorize the sale of excess Department of Defense aircraft to facilitate the suppression of wildfire.	Pub. L. 104–307 (text) (PDF)
104-308	October 19, 1996	(No short title)	To enhance fairness in compensating owners of patents used by the United States.	Pub. L. 104–308 (text) (PDF)
104-309	October 19, 1996	(No short title)	To express the sense of the Congress that United States Government agencies in possession of records about individuals who are alleged to have committed Nazi war crimes should make these records public.	Pub. L. 104–309 (text) (PDF)
104-310	October 19, 1996	(No short title)	To modify the boundaries of the Talladega National Forest, Alabama.	Pub. L. 104–310 (text) (PDF)
104-311	October 19, 1996	(No short title)	To amend the Wild and Scenic Rivers Act by designating the Wekiva River, Seminole Creek, and Rock Springs Run in the State of Florida for study and potential addition to the National Wild and Scenic Rivers System.	Pub. L. 104–311 (text) (PDF)
104-312	October 19, 1996	(No short title)	To authorize appropriations for a mining institute or institutes to develop domestic technological capabilities for the recovery of minerals from the Nation's seabed, and for other purposes.	Pub. L. 104–312 (text) (PDF)
104-313	October 19, 1996	Indian Health Care Improvement Technical Corrections Act of 1996	To amend the Indian Health Care Improvement Act to extend the demonstration program for direct billing of Medicare, Medicaid, and other third party payors.	Pub. L. 104–313 (text) (PDF)
104-314	October 19, 1996	(No short title)	To designate 51.7 miles of the Clarion River, located in Pennsylvania, as a component of the National Wild and Scenic Rivers System.	Pub. L. 104–314 (text) (PDF)
104-315	October 19, 1996	(No short title)	To amend title XIX of the Social Security Act to repeal the requirement for annual resident review for nursing facilities under the Medicaid program and to require resident reviews for mentally ill or intellectually disabled residents when there is a significant change in physical or mental condition.	Pub. L. 104–315 (text) (PDF)
104-316	October 19, 1996	General Accounting Office Act of 1996	To amend laws authorizing auditing, reporting, and other functions by the General Accounting Office.	Pub. L. 104–316 (text) (PDF)
104-317	October 19, 1996	Federal Courts Improvement Act of 1996	To make improvements in the operation and administration of the Federal courts, and for other purposes.	Pub. L. 104–317 (text) (PDF)
104-318	October 19, 1996	Emergency Drought Relief Act of 1996	To provide emergency drought relief to the city of Corpus Christi, Texas, and the Canadian River Municipal Water Authority, Texas, and for other purposes.	Pub. L. 104–318 (text) (PDF)
104-319	October 19, 1996	Human Rights, Refugee, and Other Foreign Relations Provisions Act of 1996	Making certain provisions with respect to internationally recognized human rights, refugees, and foreign relations.	Pub. L. 104–319 (text) (PDF)
104-320	October 19, 1996	Administrative Dispute Resolution Act of 1996	To reauthorize alternative means of dispute resolution in the Federal administrative process, and for other purposes.	Pub. L. 104–320 (text) (PDF)
104-321	October 19, 1996	(No short title)	Granting the consent of Congress to the Emergency Management Assistance Compact.	Pub. L. 104–321 (text) (PDF)
104-322	October 19, 1996	(No short title)	Granting the consent of the Congress to amendments made by Maryland, Virginia, and the District of Columbia to the Washington Metropolitan Area Transit Regulation Compact.	Pub. L. 104–322 (text) (PDF)
104-323	October 19, 1996	Cache La Poudre River Corridor Act	To establish the Cache La Poudre River Corridor.	Pub. L. 104–323 (text) (PDF)
104-324	October 19, 1996	Coast Guard Authorization Act of 1996	To authorize appropriations for the United States Coast Guard, and for other purposes.	Pub. L. 104–324 (text) (PDF)
104-325	October 19, 1996	Marine Mineral Resources Research Act of 1996	To promote the research, identification, assessment, and exploration of marine mineral resources, and for other purposes.	Pub. L. 104–325 (text) (PDF)
104-326	October 19, 1996	Irrigation Project Contract Extension Act of 1996	To extend contracts between the Bureau of Reclamation and irrigation districts in Kansas and Nebraska, and for other purposes.	Pub. L. 104–326 (text) (PDF)
104-327	October 19, 1996	(No short title)	To make technical corrections to the Personal Responsibility and Work Opportunity Reconciliation Act of 1996.	Pub. L. 104–327 (text) (PDF)
104-328	October 19, 1996	(No short title)	To provide for the Advisory Commission on Intergovernmental Relations to continue in existence, and for other purposes.	Pub. L. 104–328 (text) (PDF)
104-329	October 20, 1996	United States Commemorative Coin Act of 1996	To establish United States commemorative coin programs, and for other purposes.	Pub. L. 104–329 (text) (PDF)
104-330	October 26, 1996	Native American Housing Assistance and Self-Determination Act of 1996	To provide Federal assistance for Indian tribes in a manner that recognizes the right of tribal self-governance, and for other purposes.	Pub. L. 104–330 (text) (PDF)
104-331	October 26, 1996	Presidential and Executive Office Accountability Act	To make certain laws applicable to the Executive Office of the President, and for other purposes.	Pub. L. 104–331 (text) (PDF)
104-332	October 26, 1996	National Invasive Species Act of 1996	To provide for ballast water management to prevent the introduction and spread of nonindigenous species into the waters of the United States, and for other purposes.	Pub. L. 104–332 (text) (PDF)
104-333	November 12, 1996	Omnibus Parks and Public Lands Management Act of 1996	To provide for the administration of certain Presidio properties at minimal cost to the Federal taxpayer, and for other purposes.	Pub. L. 104–333 (text) (PDF)

== Private laws ==
PL	Enacted	Title	GPO link
104-1	July 24, 1996	An act for the relief of Benchmark Rail Group, Inc.	104-1
104-2	July 29, 1996	An act for the relief of Nathan C. Vance, and for other purposes.	104-2
104-3	October 9, 1996	An act for the relief of Oscar Salas-Velazquez.	104-3
104-4	October 19, 1996	An act for the relief of Nguyen Quy An.	104-4

== Treaties ==
The following is a list of the treaties ratified by the United States Senate during the 104th Congress (See Senate Approved Treaties).

Treaty number	Date of Ratification	Short title
Treaty 103-25	March 24, 1995	Convention on Prohibitions or Restrictions on the Use of Certain Conventional Weapons
Treaty 104-3	May 3, 1995	Extradition Treaty with Jordan
Treaty 102-15	May 16, 1995	Treaty with Panama on Mutual Assistance in Criminal Matters
Treaty 103-29	August 11, 1995	Tax Convention with Sweden
Treaty 103-30	August 11, 1995	Tax Convention with Ukraine
Treaty 103-31	August 11, 1995	Additional Protocol Modifying the Tax Convention with Mexico
Treaty 103-32	August 11, 1995	Tax Convention with the French Republic
Treaty 103-34	August 11, 1995	Tax Convention with the Portuguese Republic
Treaty 104-11	August 11, 1995	Exchange of Notes Relating to the Tax Convention with Ukraine
Treaty 104-4	August 11, 1995	A Revised Protocol Amending the 1980 Tax Convention with Canada
Treaty 103-1	January 26, 1996	Treaty with the Russian Federation on Further Reduction and Limitation of Strategic Offensive Arms (The START II Treaty)
Treaty 103-35	June 27, 1996	Investment Treaty with Jamaica
Treaty 103-36	June 27, 1996	Encouragement Reciprocal Investment Treaty with Republic of Belarus
Treaty 103-37	June 27, 1996	Investment Treaty with Ukraine
Treaty 103-38	June 27, 1996	Investment Treaty with the Republic of Estonia
Treaty 104-10	June 27, 1996	Investment Treaty with Mongolia
Treaty 104-12	June 27, 1996	Investment Treaty with Latvia
Treaty 104-13	June 27, 1996	Investment Treaty with Georgia
Treaty 104-14	June 27, 1996	Investment Treaty with Trinidad and Tobago
Treaty 104-19	June 27, 1996	Investment Treaty with Albania
Treaty 104-24	June 27, 1996	Agreement for the Implementation of the United Nations Convention of the Law of the Sea of 10 December 1982 Relating to Fish Stocks
Treaty 104-1	August 2, 1996	Treaty with the Republic of Korea on Mutual Legal Assistance in Criminal Matters
Treaty 104-16	August 2, 1996	Extradition Treaty with the Philippines
Treaty 104-18	August 2, 1996	Treaty with the Philippines on Mutual Legal Assistance in Criminal Matters
Treaty 104-2	August 2, 1996	Treaty with the United Kingdom on Mutual Legal Assistance in Criminal Matters
Treaty 104-20	August 2, 1996	Treaty with Hungary on Legal Assistance in Criminal Matters
Treaty 104-21	August 2, 1996	Treaty with Austria on Legal Assistance in Criminal Matters
Treaty 104-22	August 2, 1996	Extradition Treaty with Bolivia
Treaty 104-26	August 2, 1996	Extradition Treaty with Malaysia
Treaty 104-5	August 2, 1996	Extradition Treaty with Hungary
Treaty 104-7	August 2, 1996	Extradition Treaty with Belgium
Treaty 104-8	August 2, 1996	Supplementary Extradition Treaty with Belgium
Treaty 104-9	August 2, 1996	Extradition Treaty with Switzerland
Treaty 104-27	September 25, 1996	International Natural Rubber Agreement
Treaty 103-33	September 28, 1996	Tax Convention with the Republic of Kazakhstan
Treaty 104-15	September 28, 1996	Exchange of Notes Relating to the Tax Convention with Kazakhstan
Treaty 104-23	September 28, 1996	Protocol Amending Article VIII of the 1948 Tax Convention with Respect to the Netherlands Antilles
Treaty 104-32	September 28, 1996	Taxation Protocol Amending Convention with Indonesia

== See also ==
- List of United States federal legislation
- List of acts of the 105th United States Congress
