= 1966 Rhode Island gubernatorial election =

- November 8, 1966
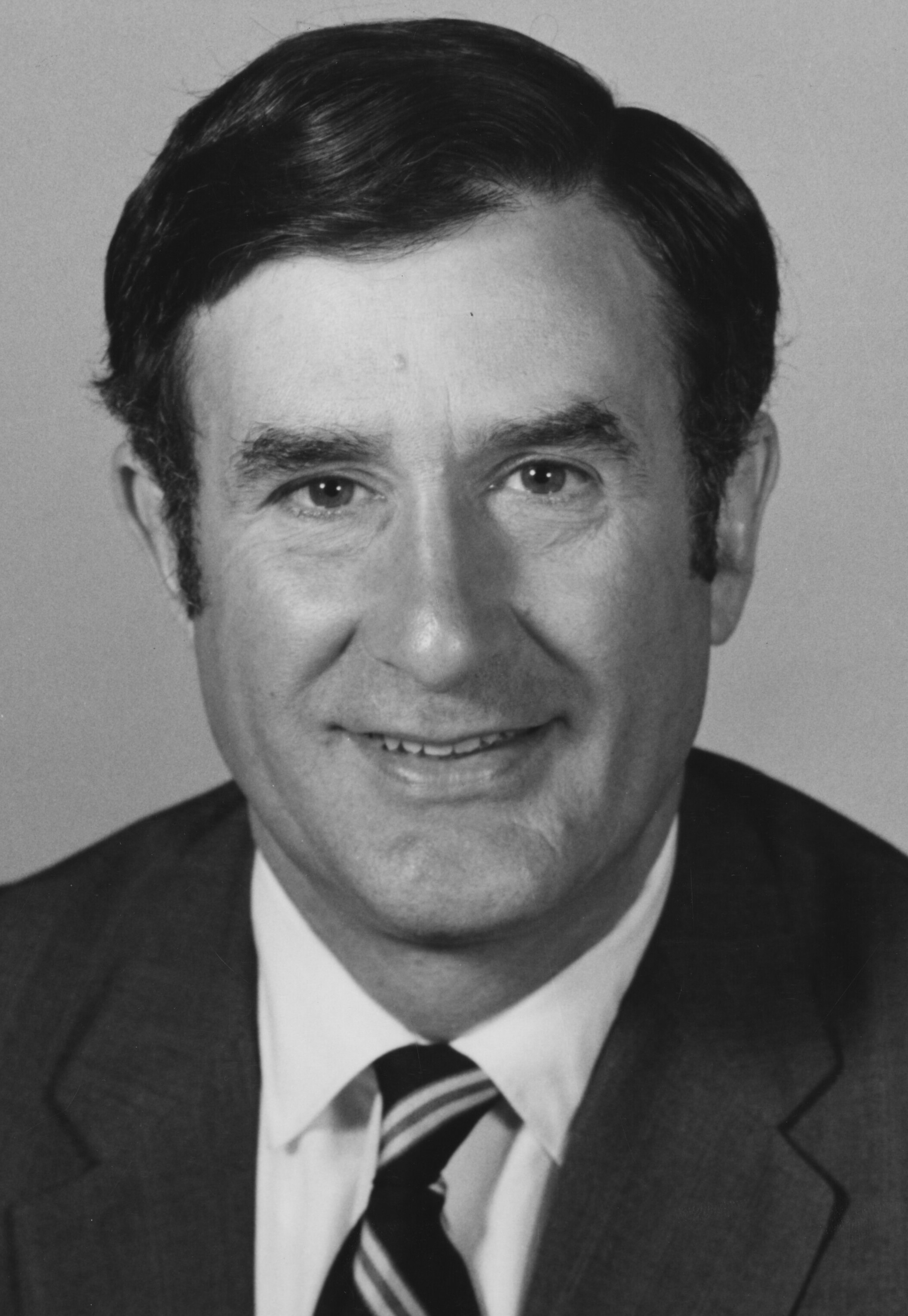

Nominee	John Chafee	Horace E. Hobbs
Party	Republican	Democratic
Popular vote	210,202	121,862
Percentage	63.30%	36.70%
- Chafee: 50–60% 60–70% 70–80%
Governor before election
John Chafee
Republican
Elected Governor
John Chafee
Republican

The 1966 Rhode Island gubernatorial election was held on November 8, 1966. Incumbent Republican John Chafee defeated Democratic nominee Horace E. Hobbs with 63.30% of the vote. This was the last gubernatorial victory for the Republican Party in Rhode Island until 1984.

== General election ==
=== Candidates ===
- John Chafee, Republican
- Horace E. Hobbs, Democratic

=== Results ===
1966 Rhode Island gubernatorial election
Party	Candidate	Votes	%	±%
Republican	John Chafee (incumbent)	210,202	63.30%	
Democratic	Horace E. Hobbs	121,862	36.70%	
Majority		88,340		
Turnout		332,064		
Republican hold		Swing		

==== By county ====
	Frank Licht Democratic		John Chafee Republican	
County	Votes	%	Votes	%
Bristol	4,708	28.0%	12,120	72.0%
Kent	17,852	34.2%	34,361	65.8%
Newport	7,354	32.1%	15,523	67.9%
Providence	84,685	38.8%	133,466	61.2%
Washington	7,263	33.0%	14,732	67.0%
