= 1964 Rhode Island gubernatorial election =

- November 3, 1964
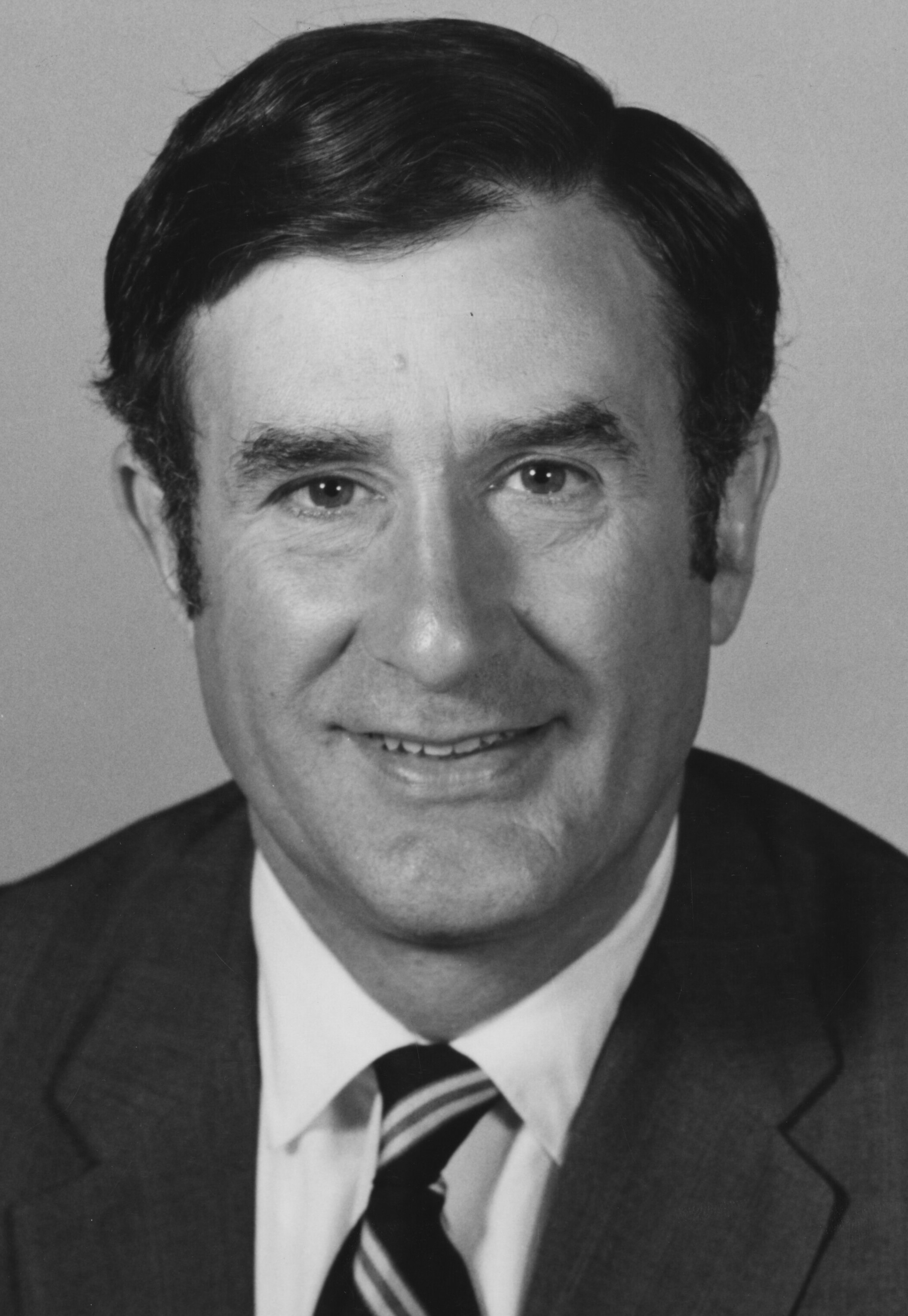

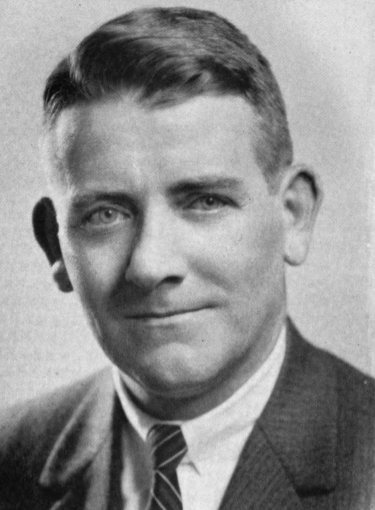
| Nominee | John Chafee | Edward P. Gallogly |
| Party | Republican | Democratic |
| Popular vote | 239,501 | 152,165 |
| Percentage | 61.15% | 38.85% |
- Chafee: 50–60% 60–70% 70–80% Gallogly: 50–60%
Governor before election
John Chafee
Republican
Elected Governor
John Chafee
Republican

The 1964 Rhode Island gubernatorial election was held on November 3, 1964. Incumbent Republican John Chafee defeated Democratic nominee Edward P. Gallogly with 61.15% of the vote.

== Primary elections ==
Primary elections were held on September 17, 1964.

=== Democratic primary ===
==== Candidates ====
- Edward P. Gallogly, incumbent lieutenant governor
- Alexander R. Walsh
- John L. Rego

==== Results ====
Democratic primary results
| Party | Candidate | Votes | % |
|---|---|---|---|
| Democratic | Edward P. Gallogly | 55,282 | 56.73 |
| Democratic | Alexander R. Walsh | 25,457 | 26.12 |
| Democratic | John L. Rego | 16,715 | 17.15 |
| Total votes | | 97,454 | 100.00 |

== General election ==
=== Candidates ===
- John Chafee, Republican
- Edward P. Gallogly, Democratic

=== Results ===
1964 Rhode Island gubernatorial election
| Party | Candidate | Votes | % | ±% |
|---|---|---|---|---|
| Republican | John Chafee (incumbent) | 239,501 | 61.15% | |
| Democratic | Edward P. Gallogly | 152,165 | 38.85% | |
| Majority | | 87,336 | | |
| Turnout | | 391,668 | | |
| Republican hold | | Swing | | |

==== By county ====
| | John Chafee Republican | | Edward Gallogly Democratic | | All Others | |
| County | Votes | % | Votes | % | Votes | % |
|---|---|---|---|---|---|---|
| Bristol | 12,946 | 68.6% | 5,926 | 31.4% | 0 | 0.0% |
| Kent | 38,098 | 66.7% | 19,033 | 33.3% | 0 | 0.0% |
| Newport | 17,000 | 63.2% | 9,883 | 36.8% | 0 | 0.0% |
| Providence | 155,593 | 59.0% | 108,315 | 41.0% | 2 | 0.01% |
| Washington | 15,864 | 63.8% | 9,008 | 38.9% | 0 | 0.0% |

Counties that flipped from Democratic to Republican

- Providence
