= Giovanni Folcarelli =

61st Lieutenant Governor of Rhode Island
- In office January 1965 – January 1967
- Governor: John Chafee
- Preceded by: Edward P. Gallogly
- Succeeded by: Joseph O'Donnell Jr.

Personal details
- Born: May 30, 1926 Providence, Rhode Island, U.S.
- Died: May 26, 1982 (aged 55) Scituate, Rhode Island, U.S.
- Party: Democratic
- Education: Boston College
- Occupation: Lawyer

Giovanni Folcarelli (May 30, 1926 – May 26, 1982) was the Lieutenant Governor of the U.S. State of Rhode Island from 1965 to 1967. He was a Democrat. Folcarelli attended Boston College and earned an LL.B. degree. He also served in World War II in the United States Army Air Forces from 1944 to 1946.

Political offices
Preceded by Edward P. Gallogly	Lieutenant Governor of Rhode Island; 1965–1967	Succeeded by Joseph O'Donnell Jr.
