= Edward P. Gallogly =

American politician

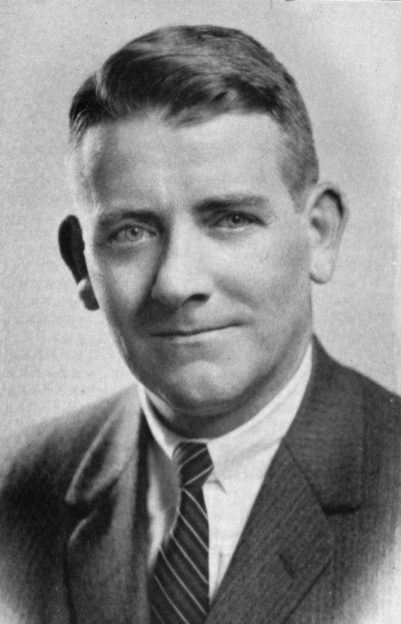

Edward Peter Gallogly (August 28, 1919 – April 18, 1995) was an American politician who served as Lieutenant Governor of Rhode Island for four years and as chief judge of the Rhode Island Family Court for 17 years.

== Biography ==
Gallogly was born in Providence, Rhode Island in 1919, one of nine children of Lawrence and Rose (née Mimnaugh) Gallogly. He graduated from Providence College in 1942 and from Boston University Law School in 1949.

== World War II ==
In 1943, he enlisted in the United States Navy and saw action in the European Theatre, including the D-Day landing at Normandy, and in the Pacific Theatre at the Philippines and Okinawa. He was discharged from active duty with the rank of lieutenant, but continued service in the Naval Reserve teaching courses in international law, international relations, and military justice at the Naval Reserve Officers School then located at Fields Point.

== Career ==
A lifelong Democrat, he became active in local politics and was elected as a state senator in 1954 as a Democrat. He was elected Lieutenant Governor of Rhode Island in 1960 and was re-elected in 1962. He served from January 1961 to January 1965. He was an unsuccessful candidate for Governor of Rhode Island in 1964 when he was defeated by incumbent Governor John Chafee.

President Lyndon B. Johnson appointed Gallogly United States Attorney for the District of Rhode Island in 1967. He served in that position until he became chief judge of the Rhode Island Family Court in 1969. He retired from the bench in 1986 after 17 years.

== Death ==
Gallogly died at his home in Wakefield, Rhode Island on April 18, 1995, aged 75.

== Family ==
Gallogly was married to Florence (Giblin) Gallogly. They were the parents of eight sons and three daughters.

Party political offices
Preceded by John A. Notte Jr.	Democratic nominee for Governor of Rhode Island; 1964	Succeeded by Horace E. Hobbs
Political offices
Preceded by John A. Notte Jr.	Lieutenant Governor of Rhode Island; 1961–1965	Succeeded by Giovanni Folcarelli
