= John Chafee =

American politician (1922–1999)

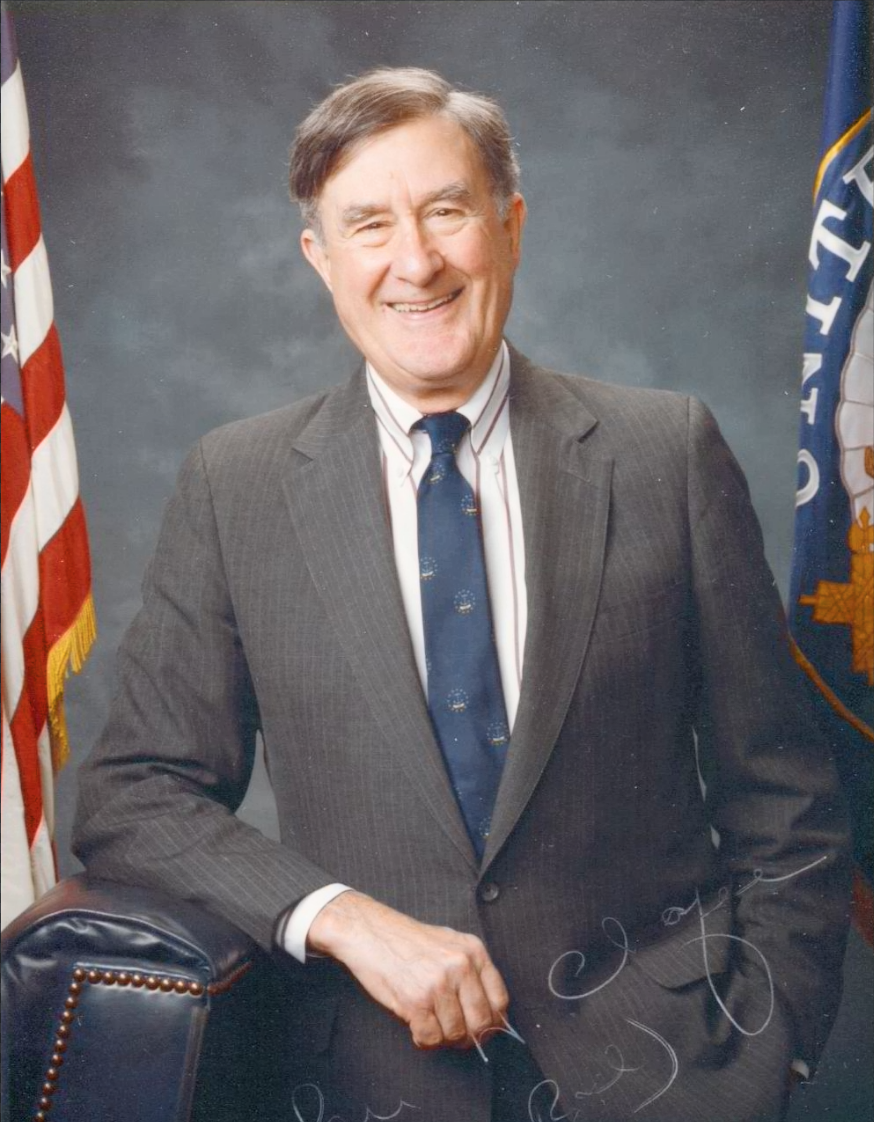

United States Senator from Rhode Island
- In office December 29, 1976 – October 24, 1999
- Preceded by: John Pastore
- Succeeded by: Lincoln Chafee
Senate positions
Chair of the Senate Environment Committee
In office January 4, 1995 – October 24, 1999
Preceded by	Max Baucus
Succeeded by	Bob Smith
Chair of the Senate Republican Conference
In office January 3, 1985 – January 3, 1991
Preceded by	Jim McClure
Succeeded by	Thad Cochran

60th United States Secretary of the Navy
- In office January 31, 1969 – May 4, 1972
- President: Richard Nixon
- Preceded by: Paul Ignatius
- Succeeded by: John Warner

66th Governor of Rhode Island
- In office January 1, 1963 – January 7, 1969
- Lieutenant: Edward P. Gallogly; Giovanni Folcarelli; Joseph O'Donnell
- Preceded by: John Notte
- Succeeded by: Frank Licht

Member of the Rhode Island House of Representatives from the Warwick's 3rd district
- In office January 1957 – January 1963
- Preceded by: Herbert B. Carkin
- Succeeded by: Carmine R. DiPetrillo

Personal details
- Born: John Lester Hubbard Chafee; October 22, 1922 Providence, Rhode Island, U.S.
- Died: October 24, 1999 (aged 77) Bethesda, Maryland, U.S.
- Party: Republican
- Spouse: Virginia Coates
- Children: 6, including Lincoln
- Education: Yale University (BA); Harvard University (LLB)
- Awards: Presidential Medal of Freedom

Military service
- Allegiance: United States
- Branch/service: United States Marine Corps
- Years of service: 1942–1945; 1951–1953
- Rank: Captain
- Battles/wars: World War II; Guadalcanal campaign; Battle of Okinawa; Korean War; Battle of Chosin Reservoir
- Chafee's voice Chafee on amendments to the Safe Drinking Water Act. Recorded November 29, 1995

John Lester Hubbard Chafee (/ˈtʃeɪfiː/ CHAY-fee; October 22, 1922 – October 24, 1999) was an American politician and officer in the United States Marine Corps. A member of the Republican Party, he served as the 66th governor of Rhode Island, as the secretary of the Navy, and as a United States senator.

== Early life and family ==
Chafee was born in Providence, Rhode Island, to a politically active family. He was the son of Janet Melissa (née Hunter) and John Sharpe Chafee. His great-grandfather, Henry Lippitt, was governor of Rhode Island (1875–1877), and among his great-uncles were a Rhode Island governor, Charles Warren Lippitt, and United States Senator Henry Frederick Lippitt. His uncle, Zechariah Chafee, was a Harvard law professor, and a notable civil libertarian. His cousin was Frederick Lippitt, former Minority Leader in the Rhode Island House of Representatives. He had two daughters and four sons, one of whom is former Rhode Island Governor and former United States Senator Lincoln Chafee. One of his daughters, Tribbie, died following an accident at a horse show in October 1968 at the age of 14. His eldest child, John H. Chafee, is a UCLA alumnus.

John Chafee graduated from a coeducational primary school, Providence's Gordon School, in 1931 and then attended Providence Country Day School. In 1940, he graduated from Deerfield Academy in Massachusetts. Chafee was an Episcopalian.

== Marine Corps service ==
Chafee was in his third year as an undergraduate at Yale University when the Japanese attacked Pearl Harbor. He interrupted his undergraduate studies and enlisted in the Marine Corps, spending his 20th birthday fighting on the island of Guadalcanal from August 8 until November 1942, when the First Marine Division was relieved. After receiving his commission as a second lieutenant, he fought in the Battle of Okinawa in the spring of 1945.

Following the war, he received degrees from Yale University in 1947 and Harvard Law School in 1950. At Yale, he was a member of the Delta Kappa Epsilon (Phi chapter) and Skull and Bones fraternities. In 1951, he was recalled to active service to be a Marine rifle company commander during the Korean War with Dog Company, 2nd Battalion, 7th Marines.

Author James Brady, in his memoir of the Korean War and serving as a Marine under Chafee, writes that "[n]owhere, at any time, did John Chafee serve more nobly than he did as a Marine officer commanding a rifle company in the mountains of North Korea," and that "[h]e was the only truly great man I've yet met in my life..."

Chafee's military awards include three awards of the Presidential Unit Citation, the Asiatic-Pacific Campaign Medal, the World War II Victory Medal, the Korean Service Medal and the United Nations Korea Medal.

== Early political career ==
Chafee became active in behind-the-scenes Rhode Island politics by helping elect a mayor of Providence in the early 1950s. He successfully ran for a seat in the Rhode Island House of Representatives in 1956 and later became the minority leader. He was re-elected in 1958 and 1960, the latter a year when many Republicans were swept from office in his state.

== Governor of Rhode Island ==
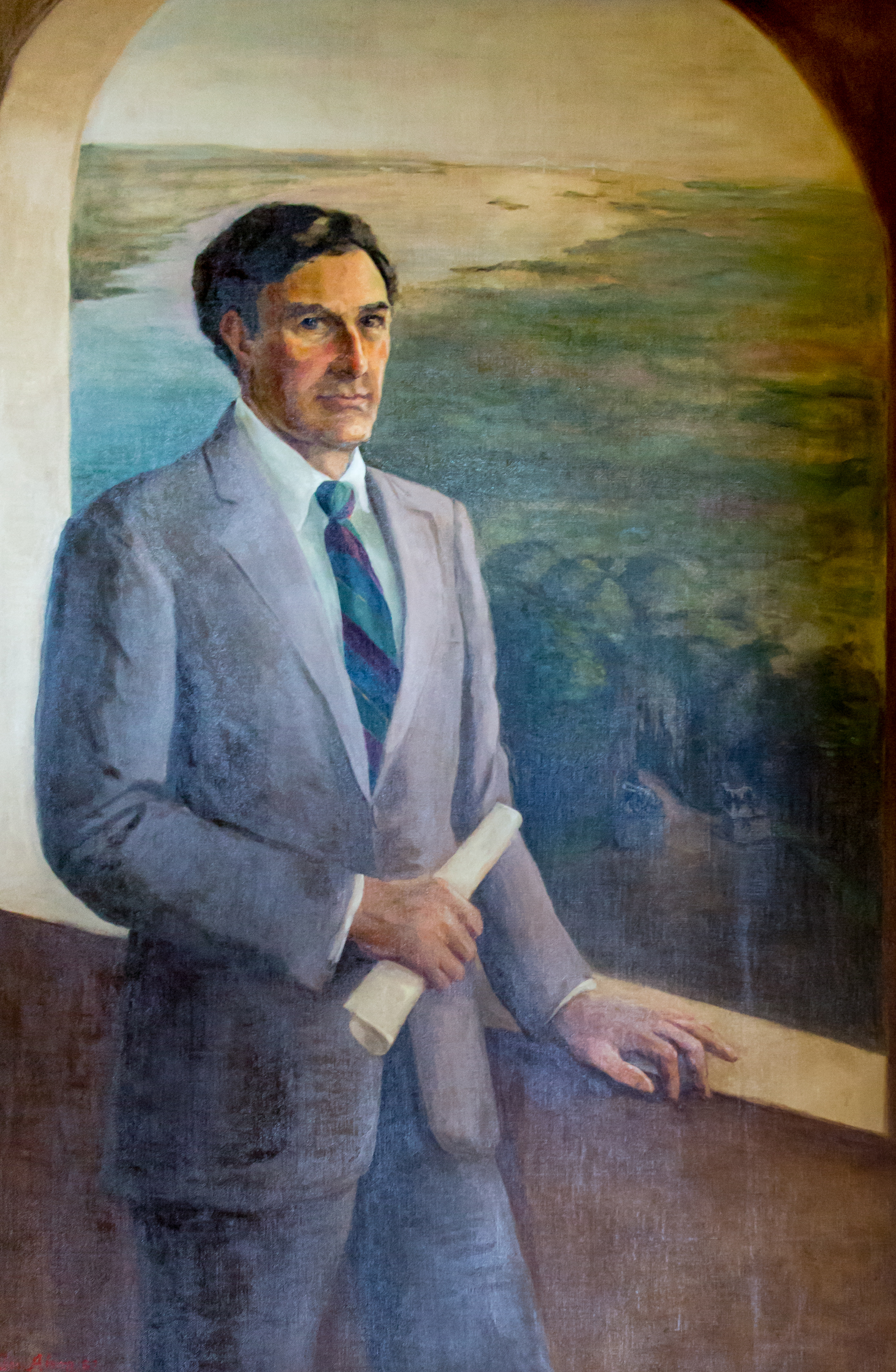
Official portrait in the Rhode Island State House

Chafee was elected governor in 1962, defeating Democratic incumbent John A. Notte Jr. The election was notable for being one of the narrowest in Rhode Island history, Chafee received 50.06% of the vote to Notte's 49.94%, winning by a margin of just 398 votes. However, Chafee quickly became popular with both Rhode Island's Republicans and Democrats, allowing him to win re-election by margins of almost 2-to-1 in 1964 and 1966. The 1964 victory made Chafee one of the few bright spots in a disastrous year for Republicans nationally; in the concurrent presidential election, Lyndon Johnson carried the state with an unheard-of 81 percent of the vote.

As governor, Chafee helped create the state's public transportation administration as well as what was known as the Green Acres program, a conservation effort. In 1968, he served as chair of the Republican Governors Association. He served as governor until 1969, when he was surprisingly defeated by underdog Democrat Frank Licht. Reasons ascribed for the defeat include the fact that, after running three times on a strong anti-income tax platform, Chafee now said that such a tax was imperative (indeed his anti-tax opponent went on to champion one in 1971); and that he stopped campaigning after his daughter was killed.

== Secretary of the Navy ==
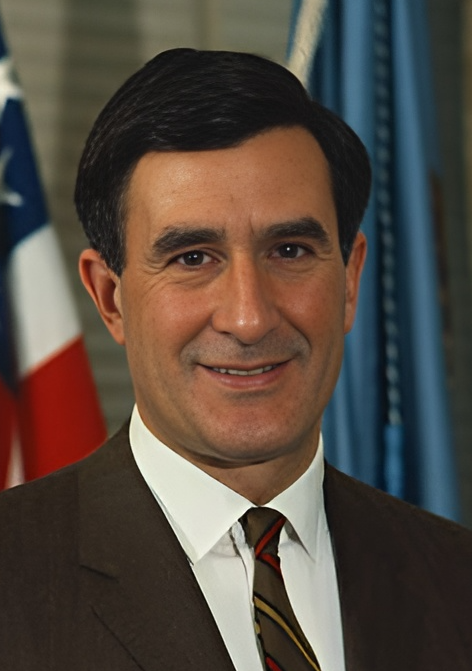
Chafee in 1969

Chafee was appointed Secretary of the Navy in 1969 by President Richard Nixon. Chafee's tenure as secretary was marked by a willingness to make bold decisions and stand by them. Emblematic of this was his decision to elevate Admiral Elmo Zumwalt as Chief of Naval Operations over 33 more senior officers, and his judicious handling of the USS Pueblo situation, in which North Korean forces, during the previous administration, had boarded and captured a navy intelligence ship. Chafee's action as Secretary of the Navy that is most clearly remembered is his disapproval of the recommendation to court martial Commander Lloyd Bucher, the commanding officer of the Pueblo, once the release of the crew had been secured. Because it was clear that the guilt clearly rested on the North Koreans and not Bucher or the sailors on the Pueblo, Chafee stated that "Bucher and his men have suffered enough", and that a court martial would only add insult to injury. He served as Secretary of the Navy until 1972, when he resigned to run for the U.S. Senate.

== U.S. Senate ==
After an unsuccessful candidacy for the Senate in 1972 against Democratic incumbent Claiborne Pell, Chafee was elected to that body in 1976 to succeed retiring Democrat John Pastore. He was the first Republican to win a Rhode Island Senate election since 1930. He joined the Senate Committee on Environment and Public Works in 1977 and made environmental matters a chief concern, often breaking with his party to the delight of conservation groups. He chaired that committee during his last term in office, from 1995 to 1999. As a result of his work, Chafee was a recipient of the Lady Bird Johnson Environmental Award.

Among the bills Chafee fostered while in the minority was the Clean Water Act of 1986, and the 1990 amendments to the Clean Air Act. He also was an architect of the 1980 Superfund program to clean up hazardous waste sites as well as the Oil Pollution Act of 1990. Chafee authored the Coastal Barrier Resources Act of 1982, establishing the Coastal Barrier Resources System (CBRS). Upon Chafee's death in 1999, the CBRS was renamed the John H. Chafee Coastal Barrier Resources System.

Like most Republicans from New England, Chafee's voting record was moderate to liberal. He was pro-choice on abortion and supported the North American Free Trade Agreement. He took a moderate stance on taxes and government assistance to the needy. He opposed the death penalty, school prayer, and the ban on homosexuals serving in the military. Chafee was one of the few Republicans to support strict gun control laws. He sponsored a bill that, if passed, would have prohibited the "manufacture, importation, exportation, sale, purchase, transfer, receipt, possession, or transportation of handguns and hand ammunition." Chafee voted in favor of the bill establishing Martin Luther King Jr. Day as a federal holiday and the Civil Rights Restoration Act of 1987 (as well as to override President Reagan's veto). Chafee voted in favor of the nomination of William Rehnquist as Chief Justice of the United States and the nomination of Clarence Thomas to the U.S. Supreme Court, but voted against the nomination of Robert Bork.

During the late 1980s and 1990s, Senator Chafee became an advocate for improving the U.S. health care system. He supported legislation to expand Medicaid coverage for low-income children and pregnant women, sponsored legislation to expand the availability of home and community-based services for persons with disabilities, and worked to enact legislation to establish Federally Qualified Health Centers. In 1992, he was appointed chairman of the Senate Republican Task Force on Health, and he worked to develop a consensus among Republicans on health care. In 1993, he joined with Democratic Louisiana Senator John Breaux to form the Senate Mainstream Coalition, a coalition of six Democratic and six Republican senators seeking bipartisan consensus on health reform. He sponsored legislation that increased funds to states to assist youths in making the transition from foster care to independent living; recognized the need for special help for youths ages 18 to 21 who have left foster care; offered states greater flexibility in designing their independent living programs; and, established accountability for states in implementing independent living programs. As a testimonial to the late Senator Chafee, the program is now entitled the John H. Chafee Foster Care Independence Program.

Chafee sat on the U.S. Senate Select Committee on Intelligence and was chairman of the Senate Finance Committee's Subcommittee on Health Care, but his biggest imprint was on environmental concerns. He also served in his party's leadership, chairing the Senate Republican Conference from 1985 to 1990.

On February 12, 1999, Chafee voted against both articles of impeachment against President Bill Clinton.

On March 15, 1999, Chafee announced that he would not seek re-election in 2000.

In October 1999, less than two weeks before his death, Chafee was one of four Senate Republicans to vote in favor of the Comprehensive Test Ban Treaty. The treaty was designed to ban underground nuclear testing and was the first major international security pact to be defeated in the Senate since the Treaty of Versailles. His last major act was authoring and sponsoring the Transportation Equity Act for the 21st century, which authorized funding for transportation programs for the next six years.

== Death ==
On October 24, 1999, around seven months after Chafee announced his retirement from the Senate, he died from heart failure at the National Naval Medical Center in Bethesda, Maryland, two days after his 77th birthday. President Clinton eulogized him, saying, "He embodied the decent center. For him, civility was not simply a matter of personal manners. He believed it was essential to the preservation of our democratic system." Chafee was succeeded in the Senate by his son, Lincoln, who went on to win a full term in his own right in 2000 and later served as Governor of Rhode Island.

== Legacy ==
The USS Chafee (DDG-90), the John H. Chafee Blackstone River Valley National Heritage Corridor and the John H. Chafee National Wildlife Refuge were named in his honor.

Bryant University in Smithfield, Rhode Island named its World Trade Center on campus after John H. Chafee for his continuing support for global trade and his association with the university.

The Chafee Social Science Center at the University of Rhode Island is named in his honor. It is the tallest building in southern Rhode Island.

The Foster Care Independence Act of 1999, passed on November 23, 1999, after his death, is known as the John H. Chafee Foster Care Independence Program. The programs are administered at the state level by Social Service Agencies. One such program, in example, is the North Carolina Links program

=== Awards and honors ===

Presidential Medal of Freedom (2000, posthumously)		Combat Action Ribbon w/ 5/16" gold star
Navy and Marine Corps Presidential Unit Citation w/ two 3/16" bronze stars (Three awards – Guadalcanal, Okinawa, Chosin Reservoir)	American Campaign Medal	Asiatic-Pacific Campaign Medal w/ two 3/16" bronze stars
World War II Victory Medal	National Defense Service Medal	Korean Service Medal w/ two 3/16" bronze stars
Republic of Korea Presidential Unit Citation	United Nations Korea Medal	Republic of Korea War Service Medal

- Audubon Medal (National Audubon Society)
- A bronze statue of Chafee was erected in Colt State Park, overlooking Narragansett Bay, in 2003

== See also ==
- List of United States Marines
- Rockefeller Republican
- List of members of the United States Congress who died in office (1950–1999)
- List of members of the American Legion

Party political offices
Preceded by Christopher Del Sesto	Republican nominee for Governor of Rhode Island; 1962, 1964, 1966, 1968	Succeeded by Herbert F. DeSimone
Preceded by John Love	Chair of the Republican Governors Association; 1967–1968	Succeeded by Ronald Reagan
Preceded by Ruth M. Briggs	Republican nominee for U.S. Senator from Rhode Island (Class 2); 1972	Succeeded by James Reynolds
Preceded by John McLaughlin	Republican nominee for U.S. Senator from Rhode Island (Class 1); 1976, 1982, 1988, 1994	Succeeded by Lincoln Chafee
Preceded by James A. McClure	Chair of the Senate Republican Conference; 1985–1990	Succeeded by Thad Cochran
Political offices
Preceded by John Notte	Governor of Rhode Island; 1963–1969	Succeeded by Frank Licht
Preceded by Paul Ignatius	United States Secretary of the Navy; 1969–1972	Succeeded by John Warner
U.S. Senate
Preceded by John Pastore	United States Senator (Class 1) from Rhode Island; 1976–1999; Served alongside: Claiborne Pell, Jack Reed	Succeeded by Lincoln Chafee
Preceded by Robert Stafford	Ranking Member of the Senate Environment Committee; 1989–1995	Succeeded by Max Baucus
Preceded by Max Baucus	Chair of the Senate Environment Committee; 1995–1999	Succeeded by Bob Smith
