= Joseph O'Donnell Jr. =

American politician

Joseph O'Donnell, Jr.

62rd Lieutenant Governor of Rhode Island
- In office January 1967 – January 1969
- Governor: John Chafee
- Preceded by: Giovanni Folcarelli
- Succeeded by: J. Joseph Garrahy

Personal details
- Born: May 22, 1925 North Smithfield, Rhode Island, U.S.
- Died: December 12, 2005 (aged 80) North Smithfield, Rhode Island, U.S.
- Party: Republican
- Education: LaSalle Academy; Maine Maritime Academy
- Occupation: Businessman

Joseph H. O'Donnell, Jr. (May 22, 1925 – December 12, 2005) was the Lieutenant Governor of the U.S. state of Rhode Island from 1967 to 1969. He was a Republican. From 1963 to 1966, he was the Rhode Island State Director of Administration.

He is the only Republican elected lieutenant governor of Rhode Island since 1940, though Bernard Jackvony was later appointed to fill a vacancy.

== Career ==
In 1963, O'Donnell began working as the director of the Rhode Island Department of Administration. In 1964, he ran unsuccessfully for Lieutenant Governor of Rhode Island. In July 1966, he resigned from the Department of Administration to campaign full-time as a candidate for Lieutenant Governor.

Political offices
Preceded by Giovanni Folcarelli	Lieutenant Governor of Rhode Island; 1967–1969	Succeeded by J. Joseph Garrahy
