= John H. Chafee National Wildlife Refuge =

National wildlife refuge in Rhode Island

- IUCN category IV (habitat/species management area)
- Location within Rhode Island Location within the United States
- Location: Washington County, Rhode Island, United States
- Nearest city: Narragansett, Rhode Island
- Coordinates: 41.50121°N 71.42727°W
- Area: 544 acres (2.20 km^{2})
- Established: 1988
- Governing body: U.S. Fish and Wildlife Service
- Website: John H. Chafee National Wildlife Refuge

The John H. Chafee National Wildlife Refuge is a national wildlife refuge of the United States, located along the Narrow River on the southern coast of Rhode Island.

== Environment and ecology ==
The Chafee NWR and adjacent lands along the Narrow River (the Pettaquamscutt River), which form the Pettaquamscutt Cove, are a designated Important Bird Area (IBA). The Audubon Society reports that the majority of the Pettaquamscutt Cove IBA is under private ownership or in open water, with smaller portions being part of the Chafee NWR (18.7%), under the ownership of conservation organizations such as the Audubon Society of Rhode Island (3.8%) and the Narrow River Land Trust (3.0%), or owned by municipalities or the State of Rhode Island.

The majority of the John H. Chafee National Wildlife Refuge by acreage consists of forest upland, emergent wetland, forest wetland, and scrub-scrub wetland. Tidal salt marsh is typical within the refuge. Within these areas of the refuge, saltmeadow cordgrass (salt hay) (Spartina patens), salt-marsh cordgrass (S. alterniflora), spike grass (Distichlis spicata), saltwort (Salicornia sp.), and sealavender (Limonium nashii) are dominant plant types.

The refuge provides habitat for the largest American black duck population in Rhode Island. The conservation of this migratory bird was the impetus for the creation of the national wildlife refuge. Other waterfowl that inhabit the Pettaquamscutt Cove area include mallard (Anas platyrhynchos), gadwall (A. strepera), American wigeon (A. americana), Canada goose (Branta canadensis), and bufflehead (Bucephala albeola). Salt-marsh and shorebirds that inhabit the region include as the saltmarsh sparrow, also called the saltmarsh sharp-tailed sparrow (Ammodramus caudacutus), as well as the seaside sparrow (A. maritimus), willet (Catoptrophorus semipalmatus), clapper rail (Rallus longirostris), greater yellowlegs (Tringa flavipes), lesser yellowlegs (T. melanoleuca), semipalmated plover (Charadrius semipalmatus), and least sandpiper (Calidris minutilla). Species that inhabit ecotone areas (such as areas between marsh and woodland) include mimic thrushes, red-winged blackbird (Agelaius phoeniceus), common yellowthroat (Geothlypis trichas), and song sparrow (Melospiza melodia). Tide creeks and open water provide habitat for least tern (Sternula antillarum), common tern (terna hirundo), and belted kingfisher (Megaceryle alcyon).

A 1998 study by the Rhode Island Coastal Resources Management Council identified 75 fish species that used the Narrow River at some point in their lives and reported that the Narrow River had the state's largest alewife run. A 2002 FWS report reported that some "28 fish species and 5 shellfish species use the lower section of the river adjacent to the refuge."

== History and administration ==
The refuge, originally named the Pettaquamscutt Cove National Wildlife Refuge, was established on November 5, 1988, as an amendment to Emergency Wetlands Resources Act and National Wildlife Refuge System Administration Act of 1966. The specific legislation creating the refuge is Title II of the Outer Continental Shelf Operations Indemnification Clarification Act of 1988. It was renamed the John H. Chafee National Wildlife Refuge in 1999, in honor of John H. Chafee, the Senator who sponsored the legislation creating the refuge.

The refuge is administered by the U.S. Fish and Wildlife Service (FWS) as part of the Rhode Island National Wildlife Refuge Complex, headquartered in Charlestown, Rhode Island; the complex includes all five National Wildlife Refuges in Rhode Island: Chafee NWR, Block Island NWR, Ninigret NWR, Sachuest Point NWR, and Trustom Pond NWR.

As of 2006, the size of the refuge was 368 acres (149 ha), In 2009, an additional 120 acres (49 ha) were added to the refuge following a dial between the State of Rhode Island and FWS brokered by The Conservation Fund. In the deal, two tracts of land owned by the State of Rhode Island—the "Camp Pastore" property in Charlestown (of 48 acres (19 ha) along the northwest shoreline of Watchaug Pond) and the "Stedman" property (72 acres (29 ha) abutting the refuge in Kingstown—were added to the refuge grounds. The Stedman property was purchased by FWS using funds from the federal Land and Water Conservation Fund, while the state granted a conservation easement over the Camp Pastore property to The Nature Conservancy. The total size of the refuge is now 544 acres (220 ha).

In 2002, FWS estimated the annual visitorship at the Chafee Refuge to be 5,000, although the agency noted that the entire refuge boundary has not been posted and that public use is not monitored. In addition to wildlife observation, waterfowl hunting is permitted at the refuge (by boat access only). Shoreline fishing, canoeing, and kayaking are allowed from designed access points only.
