= Oahu National Wildlife Refuge Complex =

Coordinates: 21.67812°N 157.95009°W

Oahu National Wildlife Refuge Complex is a National Wildlife Refuge complex in the state of Hawaii.

A fire burned 2.5 miles in October 2023.

== Refuges within the complex ==
- James Campbell National Wildlife Refuge
- Oahu Forest National Wildlife Refuge
