= Treasury Department Appropriations Act =

Laws enacted by the US government

The Treasury Department Appropriations Act may refer to one of many Acts of Congress enacted to fund the United States Department of the Treasury. For example, on November 19, 1995, President Clinton signed legislation called "Treasury, Postal Service, and General Government Appropriations Act, 1996". The bill made appropriations for several government agencies, including the Department of the Treasury, for the fiscal year ending September 30, 1996.

== List of Appropriations Acts ==
- 1968: Public Law 90-47
- 1995: Pub. L. 103–329

== See also ==
- Appropriation bill
