= Taxpayer Bill of Rights =

Proposed US state referendums

The Taxpayer Bill of Rights (abbreviated TABOR) is a concept advocated by conservative and free market libertarian groups, primarily in the United States, as a way of limiting the growth of government. It is not a charter of rights but a provision requiring that increases in overall tax revenue be tied to inflation and population increases unless larger increases are approved by referendum.

== 1992 Colorado constitutional amendment ==
In 1992, the voters of the state approved a measure which amended Article X of the Colorado Constitution that restricts revenues for all levels of government (state, local, and schools). Under TABOR, state and local governments cannot raise tax rates without voter approval and cannot spend revenues collected under existing tax rates without voter approval if revenues grow faster than the rate of inflation and population growth. Revenue in excess of the TABOR limit, commonly referred to as the "TABOR surplus", must be refunded to taxpayers, unless voters approve a revenue change as an offset in a referendum. Under TABOR, the state has returned more than $2 billion to taxpayers.

The allowance for spending to grow at the rate of inflation plus population growth means that inflation-adjusted per capita spending generally did not decrease. However, spending growth could be interrupted due to an economic recession, in which case inflation-adjusted per capita spending did decrease—and TABOR did not permit inflation-adjusted per capita spending to return to its pre-recession level. This was known as the "ratchet-down effect", and it occurred in FY2001–02 and FY2002–03. The ratchet-down effect was desirable to those who believed government was consuming too large a fraction of Colorado's gross state product (GSP), and undesirable to those who believed government was consuming too small a fraction of Colorado's GSP.

In November 2005, Coloradans approved Referendum C, a ballot measure that loosened many of TABOR's restrictions. This measure allowed the state to retain and spend money from existing revenue sources above the TABOR limit each year beginning in FY 2005–06 for five years through FY 2009–10. Beginning in FY 2010–11, the state was allowed to spend revenue above the TABOR limit up to a capped amount known as the "Referendum C cap. The Referendum C cap grows from the prior year's cap instead of the prior year's spending by inflation plus population growth. In effect, Referendum C eliminated the ratchet-down effect.

Any retained Referendum C revenue (revenue above the allowable TABOR limit but below the Referendum C cap) is statutorily required to be spent on health care, education, firefighter and police retirement plans, and strategic transportation projects. Colorado Legislative Council staff reported in 2009 that the state would have faced a significant budget shortfall had Referendum C not passed. Therefore, in many instances the Referendum C money that has been spent is not new money to programs, rather it maintained the programs and prevented them from undergoing cuts. It is money the programs may not have received without Referendum C, but it is not additional money when compared with prior years. However, the report also admits that it is impossible to enumerate this impact because it would require knowledge of what budgetary actions the state would have taken had Referendum C failed. Referendum C and other attempts to mitigate the effects of TABOR are referred to as "de-Brucing" after Douglas Bruce, the author of the amendment. The effects of TABOR on government spending and economic growth have been a popular discussion topic in recent years. Proponents accredit much of Colorado's economic prosperity in the period immediately following adoption of the law to the limit and its effect on government spending and taxes.

When Colorado voters passed the law that legalized marijuana, the voters approved using tax money generated from marijuana sales for schools, police, and drug education. As of April 2015, projections for marijuana tax revenue for Colorado were at $58 million, but it was unclear at that time whether the additional revenue would have to be returned to taxpayers due to the provisions in the state's Taxpayer Bill of Rights.

=== Advocates ===
Douglas Bruce is a conservative activist, former legislator, and convicted felon in the U.S. state of Colorado, most widely known for being the author of Colorado's Taxpayer Bill of Rights (TABOR). A strict advocate for limited government, Bruce wrote and promoted TABOR.

The TABOR Foundation has partnered with Mountain States Legal Foundation to sue to enforce TABOR in Colorado, arguing that vehicle registration fees and other fees enacted without a vote of the people are actually taxes. MSLF has also sued on behalf of the Colorado Union of Taxpayers Foundation's members, challenging the City of Aspen's grocery bag tax.

=== Repeal efforts ===
Over the years, TABOR opponents have tried to challenge it in various ways, including a federal lawsuit filed in May 2011. In May 2017, the U.S. District Court ruled the plaintiffs didn't have standing to sue, but in July 2019, the United States Court of Appeals for the Tenth Circuit reversed that decision, allowing the lawsuit to proceed. In early 2015, former Governor Roy Romer, offering then-Governor John Hickenlooper advice for his new term, said he should lead the charge to repeal TABOR. Gov. Hickenlooper smiled and applauded but did not respond at the event; however, a few weeks later, he said such a move would be doomed. The Denver Post editorial board, which opposed TABOR in 1992, ran an editorial in February 2017 titled "Make Colorado greater: Fix TABOR", in which they offered three reasons why an outright repeal wasn't realistic, but suggested three possible workarounds.

== TABOR in other states ==
Reforms similar to Colorado's have been put forward in several states. In 2006, two Libertarian groups financially backed by New York real estate developer Howie Rich campaigned for laws similar to TABOR in eight states.

Measures similar to the "Taxpayer Bill of Rights" are more likely to be adopted on the county and municipal level than on a statewide basis beyond Colorado; one municipality adopting the plan in recent years has been Spring Hill, Tennessee. After the November 2005 setback for proponents in Colorado, advocates in many regions are now downplaying the name "Taxpayer Bill of Rights" in favor of other terms such as "Spending Limitation Movement". Organizations dedicated to shrinking government are pushing for the adoption of TABORs in other states. Currently, Colorado is the only state with TABOR. In 2005, TABOR proposals were introduced in about half of the states. A TABOR referendum on the ballot in Maine as an initiative effort led by Mary Adams was defeated in November 2006. Similar referendums were also defeated in Nebraska and Oregon that year. Similar initiatives in Maine and Washington were defeated in 2009.

In North Carolina, some Republicans want a constitutional amendment to limit growth in spending to population growth and the rate of inflation.

== National legislation ==
The concept is connected to several laws that have been passed. Examples include the Omnibus Taxpayer Bill of Rights (Subtitle J of the Technical and Miscellaneous Revenue Act of 1988), the Taxpayer Bill of Rights 2 passed in 1996, and the Taxpayer Bill of Rights III passed in 1998.

Nationally, Members of Congress have made attempts to give taxpayers more rights in terms of tax debts and interactions with the IRS. Congressman Pete Roskam (R-IL) introduced a bill in the House of Representatives called the Taxpayer Bill of Rights (H.R. 1058). 11 Republicans cosponsored the bill. The bill would require that the IRS provide people with quality service; people would only have to pay the correct amount of their taxes owed; the IRS would be required to implement better customer service; and people would have a "voice" in the process when challenging an IRS ruling.

== IRS Taxpayer Bill of Rights ==
The IRS has offered its own version of a taxpayer bill of rights since the year 2014. Describing the rights, the IRS has written, "Each and every taxpayer has a set of fundamental rights they should be aware of when dealing with the IRS. Explore your rights and our obligations to protect them." The rights are available to the public online in a document called Publication 1: Your Rights as a Taxpayer. To help people understand their rights when dealing with the IRS, the IRS has an independent agency within the IRS called the Taxpayer Advocate Service.

== 1989 Illinois law ==
The Taxpayers' Bill of Rights Act (20 ILCS 2520), is a provision of Illinois state law. It outlines rights of taxpayers and the powers and duties of the Department of Revnue, and gives taxpayers "the right to sue the Department of Revenue if such Department intentionally or recklessly disregards tax laws or regulations in collecting taxes".

== See also ==
- Financial referendum
- Taxpayer Bill of Rights III, an Act of Congress
- Proposition 13, which capped property taxes in California
- Proposition 2½, which capped property and excise taxes in Massachusetts
