= Tax Analysts =

American financial publisher

- Founded: 1970
- Type: Nonprofit
- Tax ID no.: 23-7073182
- Location: Falls Church, Virginia, U.S.
- Website: taxnotes.com

Tax Analysts is a nonprofit publisher offering the Tax Notes portfolio of products, including weekly magazines featuring commentary, daily online journals featuring news and analysis, and research tools, all focused on tax policy and administration. Tax Analysts also promotes transparency in tax policymaking and holds regular conferences on key tax issues.

== History ==
Thomas F. Field founded Tax Analysts in 1970 as part of an effort to expose tax policymaking to the general public at a time when it was being heavily influenced by special interests. The organization provided analysis on prominent policy debates, offered congressional testimony on proposed legislation and published op-eds that could reach a broader audience. But within 10 years, the group had shifted focus and become the country's foremost provider of unbiased tax information with a style that has since come to be regarded by tax professionals as "the epitome of hard-nosed impartiality."

The organization underwent a restructuring at the end of 2001 as it sought to deal with globalization, technological advances, and increased competition in the tax publishing arena. In 2004, Field retired from Tax Analysts and was succeeded by Christopher Bergin, who had until then been the editor of Tax Notes, the organization's flagship publication.

Cara Griffith succeeded Bergin as CEO in August 2017. The organization currently has 173 employees, most of whom are based out of the company's headquarters in Falls Church, Virginia, supplemented by a network of more than 250 domestic and international tax correspondents.

Since its founding, the organization has grown dramatically in size and scope, moving from a relatively small nonprofit to a publisher with correspondents across the country and around the globe providing information to more than 150,000 readers worldwide.

== Mission, staffing, and governance ==
=== Mission ===
To shed light on tax policy and administration through aggressive, unbiased reporting and informed commentary from the leaders in the field.

=== Management team ===
- Cara Griffith - President and CEO
- Jeremy Scott - Chief Operations Officer
- Chuck O’Toole - Chief Content Officer
- Michael Berkeley - Chief Information Officer
- Carl Walker - Chief Financial Officer
- Peter Billingsley - Chief Growth Officer

=== Board of directors ===
- Ameek Ashok Ponda, chair – a partner at Sullivan & Worcester LLP in Boston and former member of the firm’s management committee.
- Sharda Cherwoo – Independent board director, start-up mentor, digital transformation leader.
- Eli J. Dicker – managing director of national markets at Crowe LLP.
- Karen Hawkins – a former chair of the American Bar Association Section of Taxation.
- Joseph Huddleston – an executive director in EY’s National Tax Department serving the indirect and state and local tax practices.
- David J. Kautter – Federal Tax Specialty Leader for RSM and former Assistant Secretary of the Treasury for Tax Policy who served as acting commissioner of the IRS from November 2017 until October 2018.
- Tom Neubig – a founding member of the Tax Sage Network, a group of tax policy economists and former director of quantitative economics and statistics at EY.
- Nina Olson – the executive director of the Center for Taxpayer Rights and former National Taxpayer Advocate.
- Danielle Rolfes – partner and co-leader of the international tax group within KPMG's Washington National Tax office.
- H. David Rosenbloom – member of Caplin & Drysdale in Washington and the James S. Eustice Visiting Professor of Taxation and director of the international tax program at New York University School of Law.
- Sam Sim – Senior adviser, Vienna University Global Tax Policy Center and member of the International Association of Tax Judges.
- Samuel C. Thompson, Jr. – the Arthur Weiss Distinguished Faculty Scholar and the director of the Center for the Study of Mergers and Acquisitions at Penn State Law.

== Publishing ==
The organization publishes:

- Tax Notes Federal: Tax Analysts' flagship publication, published weekly, provides news and in-depth commentary on federal tax developments
- Tax Notes Today Federal: daily online publication providing comprehensive federal tax news and analysis
- Tax Notes State: published weekly, provides news and in-depth commentary on state and local tax issues
- Tax Notes Today State: daily online publication providing comprehensive state and local tax news and analysis
- Tax Notes International: published weekly, provides news and in-depth commentary on international tax issues
- Tax Notes Today International: daily online publication providing comprehensive international tax news and analysis
- Tax Notes Today Global: daily online publication providing multinational tax news and analysis from a U.S. perspective
- The Exempt Organization Tax Review: published monthly, provides news and in-depth commentary on the latest issues facing tax-exempt organizations
- Insurance Expert: daily online publication focusing on insurance taxation
- Tax Practice Expert: weekly update on federal taxation designed for tax practitioners who work with individuals and small businesses
- Exempt Organizations Expert: daily online publication focusing on nonprofit taxation

The organization also produces several research tools and reference sources, including:

- Tax Notes Research: a free federal tax law library containing the Internal Revenue Code of 1986, IRS regulations, Treasury decisions and other primary sources
- Worldwide Tax Treaties: a database of more than 12,200 tax treaties with comparison tools
- Transfer Pricing Center: a comprehensive research tool featuring the latest OECD, U.S., and international transfer pricing rules, guidance, news, and analysis.
- The Tax Directory: a directory of corporate tax professionals in the U.S. and the government officials who write, implement, and interpret tax laws in the U.S. and abroad

== Other activities ==
=== FOIA advocacy ===
Tax Analysts has devoted extensive time and effort to ensure public access to key documents in tax policy and administration. When necessary, it has sued the IRS for access to documents through which the agency provides guidance to its staff and individual taxpayers. Using the Freedom of Information Act, Tax Analysts fought for access to key documents in tax policy and administration. In 1972, the organization successfully sued the IRS for access to private letter rulings (PLRs) and technical advice memorandums (TAMs) — crucial guidance documents that provided legal advice to specific taxpayers and IRS field agents.

Over the years, those had become sort of "secret laws" whereby the IRS decided how to apply the law to particular taxpayers and then refused to make the terms public. This practice left other taxpayers at a disadvantage, since the IRS relied on existing secret guidance when deciding subsequent cases. At the same time, it gave an unfair advantage to a few large law and accounting firms that had joined forces to create a private library of these undisclosed materials.

The courts gave Tax Analysts access to PLRs, and Congress soon required public disclosure of TAMs as well. Those were the foundation for almost 40 years of subsequent litigation by the firm to defend disclosure and tax transparency. The organization continues to work for transparency in the administration of tax law and recently forced the IRS to disclose guidance being sent to its field agents via email.

=== Conferences ===
The organization hosts policy forums and roundtable discussions to examine issues in federal, state, and international taxation.

=== Tax History Project ===
In 1995 Tax Analysts created the Tax History Project to provide information about the history of American taxation to scholars, policymakers, students, citizens, and the media. The project provides access to web-based documentary publications, original historical research, tax returns filed by U.S. presidents and presidential candidates, and other archival data.

Joseph J. Thorndike is the director of the project.
