= Erin M. Collins =

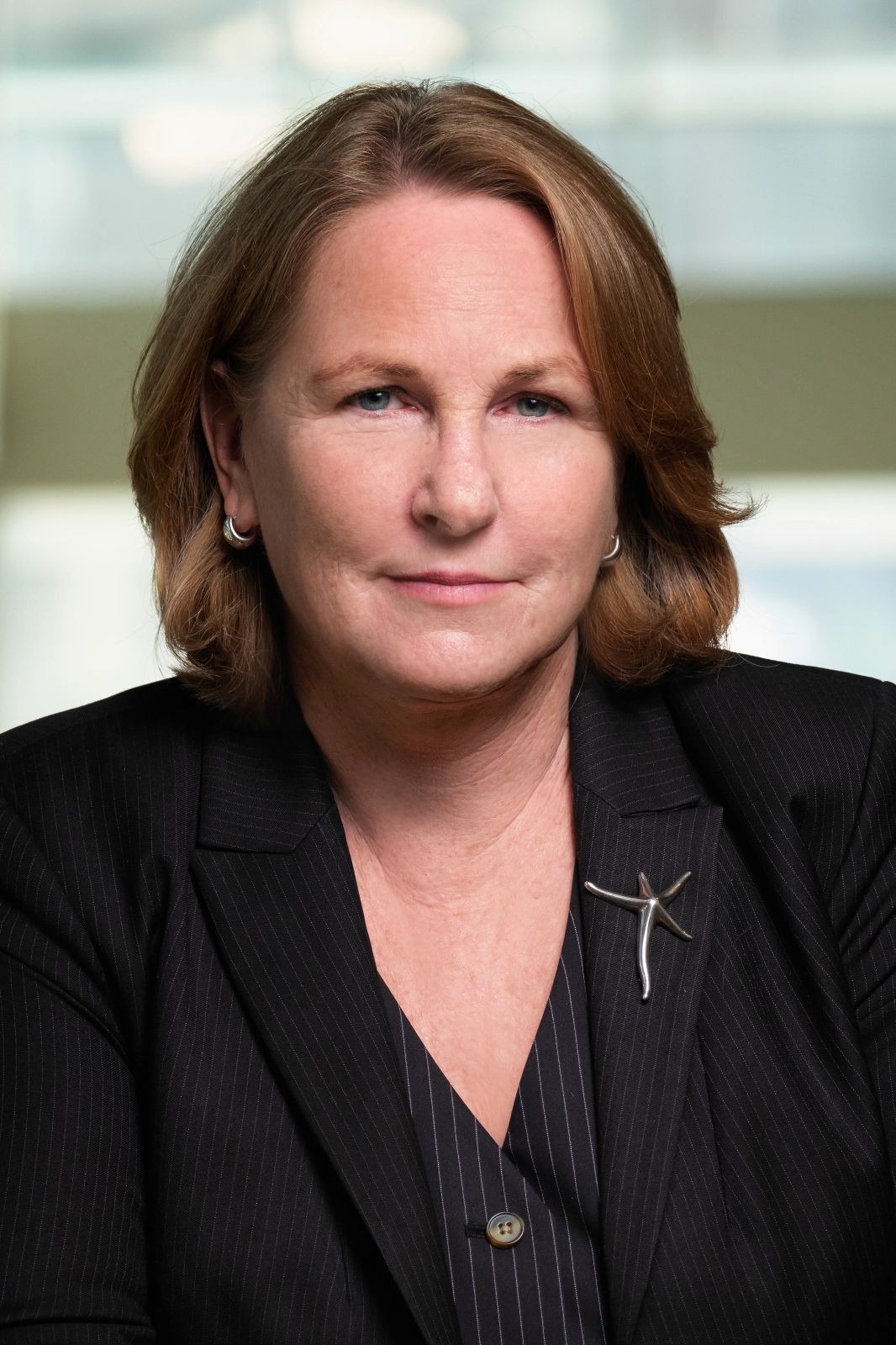
Erin M. Collins, National Taxpayer Advocate

Erin M. Collins is the current United States Taxpayer Advocate, and head of the Office of the Taxpayer Advocate, an independent organization within the Internal Revenue Service (IRS) established to protect taxpayers’ rights under the Taxpayer Bill of Rights, help taxpayers resolve problems with the IRS, and recommend changes that will prevent the problems.

== Erin M. Collins, National Taxpayer Advocate ==
In March 2020, Secretary Steven Mnuchin appointed Erin M. Collins as the National Taxpayer Advocate and she now oversees the Office of the Taxpayer Advocate Service (TAS). She is the “Voice of the Taxpayer” within the IRS and before Congress. TAS serves as a “safety net” for taxpayers by advocating for resolution of individual and business taxpayer issues within the IRS. She identifies and works toward systemic changes for all taxpayers while protecting Taxpayer Rights. TAS also oversees the Low Income Taxpayer Clinic (LITC) federal grant program and the Taxpayer Advocacy Panel (TAP). As part of her Annual Report to Congress, she makes administrative and legislative changes to protect taxpayer rights and works toward improving the quality of taxpayer service and tax administration by being an independent voice inside the IRS. As the National Taxpayer Advocate, Erin testifies before the Senate Finance Committee, the U.S. House of Representatives Ways and Means Committee Oversight Subcommittee, and the Senate Appropriations Subcommittee on topics concerning tax administration and taxpayer rights.

In 2022, the American Institute of CPAs (AICPA) and CPA Practice Advisor magazine selected Erin as one of the top 25 Most Powerful Women in the Accounting Profession, and Accounting Today recognized her as one of the 100 Most Influential People in Accounting. Also in 2022, Money.com selected Erin as a Changemaker: 50 Innovators Shaping Americans’ Finances. In 2023, Erin received KPMG’s Fifth Annual Network of Women Alumni Legacy Award and the California Lawyers Association’s Joanne M. Garvey Lifetime Achievement Award, and Accounting Today recognized Erin as one of the 100 Most Influential People in Accounting. Most recently, the UCLA Extension Tax Controversy Institute selected Erin to receive the Bruce I. Hochman Award in recognition of her proficiency in tax law and contributions as a dynamic leader. Once again in 2024, Accounting Today recognized her on their top 100 list, spotlighting her unwavering commitment to constructive accountability. Erin is frequently cited in national news media outlets and tax news publications and appears annually as a guest on C-SPAN's Washington Week Program. Erin is the co-author of the Practising Law Institute’s IRS Practice and Procedure Deskbook and frequently speaks on IRS practice, procedure, controversy, and litigation matters before many professional organizations and on several government and tax industry podcasts.

Erin has over 35 years of experience in tax law, spanning 15 years in the IRS Office of Chief Counsel and 20 years at the accounting firm of KPMG LLP before retiring in 2019 as the Tax Managing Director in charge of its tax controversy practice for the Western region. Throughout her career with KMPG, Erin represented thousands of individuals, partnerships, and small companies, and corporate taxpayers in federal examinations, IRS appeals, and before the U.S. Tax Court on domestic and international tax issues.

Before joining TAS, Erin represented several clients pro bono to help them resolve issues with the IRS. She was also a volunteer and board member of a non-profit organization, Step Up, which helps girls in under-resourced communities fulfill their potential by empowering them to become confident, college-bound, career-focused, and ready to join the next generation of professional women.

Erin is married to Ed Robbins, Jr., and they have two children and four grandchildren.
