= Independent Office of Appeals =

Independent organization within the US Internal Revenue Service

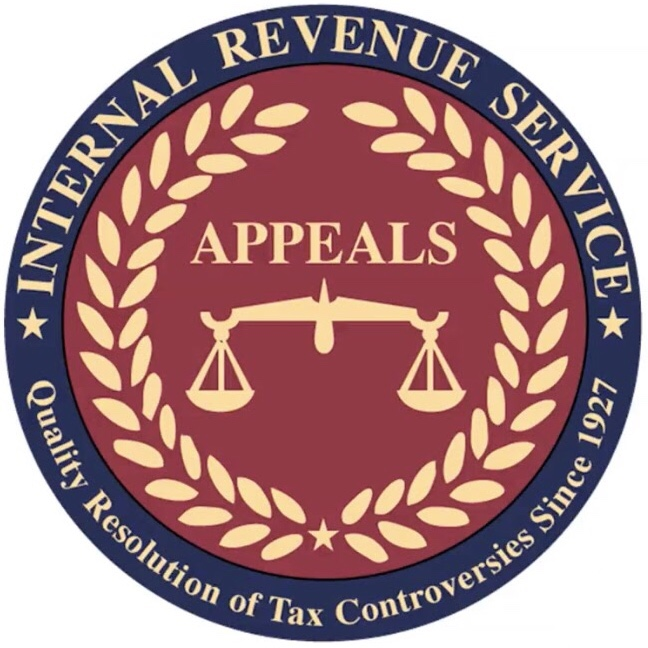

Agency overview
- Formed: July 28, 1927
- Headquarters: 999 North Capitol St NE, Washington, DC 20002, USA
- Agency executives: Andrew J. Keyso, Jr., Chief (acting); Kathryn F. Patterson, Deputy Chief (acting); Kristen E. Bailey, Collection; Shelley M. Foster, Exam
- Parent agency: IRS
- Website: www.irs.gov/appeals/appeals-an-independent-organization

The Independent Office of Appeals ("Appeals") is an independent organization within the U.S. Internal Revenue Service that helps taxpayers resolve their tax disputes through an informal, administrative process. Its mission is to resolve tax controversies fairly and impartially, without litigation.

Appeals reviews cases after the agency's compliance function has made its decision, offering an objective point of view on each appealed case.

Appeals’ role is to settle disputes in a fair and impartial basis that favors neither the government nor the taxpayer. Independence is the most important of Appeals’ core values. According to Commissioner Rettig, quoting from former Commissioner Caplin, the role of the entire agency is to perform its work in a "fair and impartial manner, with neither a government nor a taxpayer point of view."

In line with its mission to resolve cases prior to litigation, Appeals is authorized to review the facts of the case considering the hazards that would exist if the case were litigated. Appeals is the only IRS unit authorized to consider hazards of litigation when deciding whether to allow taxes and penalties.

== Mediation ==
Appeals also offers mediation services through Fast Track Settlement and other programs. These mediation programs are designed to help taxpayers resolve their disputes at the earliest possible stage in the audit or collection process.

== Collection ==
In Collection cases, Appeals does not take investigative actions with respect to financial information provided by taxpayers. Financial information needing investigation or verification is sent to Collection.

== Average Case Resolution Time ==
Resolution of a case in Appeals "could take anywhere from 90 days to a year." During fiscal year 2018, non-docketed cases involving in-person conferences remained in Appeals’ inventory for more than twice as long (394 days) as Appeals cases overall (194 days).

== Staffing ==
Appeals staff has been cut by nearly 40 percent, from 2,172 in fiscal 2010 to 1,345 in 2017.

Nina E. Olson, when she served as the IRS National Taxpayer Advocate, mentioned Appeals in her 2018 testimony before Congress, advising lawmakers, "Activities like outreach and education, congressional and media relations, examinations, and collections in a country as large and diverse as ours require local knowledge and interaction. Yet 12 states do not have Appeals or Settlement Officers within their borders."

== 2019 Changes ==
The Taxpayer First Act codified additional parts of the Office of Appeals procedures and added the word "Independent" to its name.

== Chief of Appeals ==
The acting chief is Andrew J. Keyso Jr.
