= Office of the Taxpayer Advocate =

Independent organization within the U.S. Internal Revenue Service

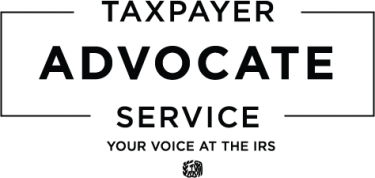

Agency overview
- Headquarters: Internal Revenue Service Building; 1111 Constitution Ave., NW; Washington, D.C. 20224; United States
- Motto: Your Voice at the IRS
- Employees: Approx. 1,500 (2025)
- Annual budget: $271 million (2024)
- Agency executives: Erin M. Collins, National Taxpayer Advocate; Kim S. Stewart, Deputy National Taxpayer Advocate
- Parent agency: Internal Revenue Service
- Website: www.taxpayeradvocate.irs.gov

The Office of the Taxpayer Advocate, also called the Taxpayer Advocate Service (TAS), is an office within the Internal Revenue Service (IRS) of the U.S. Department of the Treasury, reporting directly to the Commissioner of Internal Revenue. The office is under the supervision and direction of the National Taxpayer Advocate, who is appointed by the Secretary of Treasury.

== History ==
Established in 1996, the Office of the Taxpayer Advocate has its origins in other Internal Revenue Service programs, such as the Taxpayer Service Program (formalized in 1963) and Problem Resolution Program (established in 1977). On the recommendation of the House Government Operations Committee, the Taxpayer Ombudsman was established within the Office of the IRS Commissioner in 1979, reporting directly to the Commissioner of Internal Revenue. In 1984, the problem resolution offices (PRO) consisted of 80 full time employees and was headed by George A. O'Hanlon, the IRS ombudsman at the time. Commentators called for expanding the number of ombudsman as part of wider criticism of how the IRS was operating. The 1988 Taxpayer Bill of rights gave the Ombudsman additional authority to intervene and overturn IRS decisions in certain cases.

The position of Taxpayer Advocate was created under the Taxpayer Bill of Rights 2, an act of the United States Congress which became law on July 30, 1996. The office replaced the previous Office of the Ombudsman within the IRS. The Taxpayer Advocate was initially appointed by the IRS commissioner until the Internal Revenue Service Restructuring and Reform Act of 1998 transferred appointment authority to the United States Secretary of the Treasury.

== Responsibilities ==
=== Individual case advocacy ===
The TAS consists of approximately 1,500 employees. About 1,000 of these are Case Advocates, who personally assist taxpayers in resolving their problems with the IRS. Taxpayers may qualify for personal assistance from TAS if they are experiencing economic harm or significant cost (including fees for professional representation) as a result of their tax issue, have experienced a delay of more than 30 days in resolving their issue, or have not received a response or resolution by the date promised by the IRS.

Cases are handled by a Local Taxpayer Advocate office located in each US state, the District of Columbia, and Puerto Rico. These offices are contacted directly by taxpayers, and also receive cases referred by the IRS or Members of Congress.

The National Taxpayer Advocate may, upon application from a taxpayer, issue a Taxpayer Assistance Order (TAO) if the Advocate determines that the taxpayer is suffering (or is about to suffer) a "significant hardship" resulting from the way the U.S. Federal tax law is being administered, or if the taxpayer meets other prescribed requirements. The TAO may require the IRS to release property that has been levied, or to cease an action, or to take legally permitted action, or to refrain from taking any action against the taxpayer, under various provisions of the tax law.

=== Systemic advocacy ===
In addition, the TAS identifies systemic problems that exist within the Internal Revenue Service and, to the extent possible, propose changes in the administrative practices and identify potential legislative changes which may be appropriate to mitigate such problems. These observations and proposals are presented to Congress each year in the National Taxpayer Advocate's "Annual Report to Congress".

== Leadership ==
The National Taxpayer Advocate is the head of the Office of the Taxpayer Advocate, is appointed by the Secretary of Treasury and reports directly to the Commissioner of Internal Revenue. The Advocate acts as an ombudsman for the taxpayer. In addition to the duties as the head of the office, the Advocate is responsible for submitting annual reports on objectives and recommendations to the Committee on Ways and Means of the United States House of Representatives and the Committee on Finance of the United States Senate. The reports are submitted without any prior review or comment from the Commissioner, the Secretary of the Treasury, any other officer or employee of the Department of the Treasury, or the Office of Management and Budget.

Taxpayer ombudsman/advocate
Name	Term start	Term end
Harold M. Browning	January 14, 1980	
George A. O'Hanlon	1983	
Damon O. Holmes	Dec 6, 1987	Feb 1993
Lee R. Monks	June 1993	1998
W. Val Oveson	1998	October 2000
Henry O. Lamar Jr. (acting)		
Nina E. Olson	January 2001	July 31, 2019
Bridget T. Roberts (acting)	July 31, 2019	March 30, 2020
Erin M. Collins	March 30, 2020	-

== Criticism ==
Shortly after creation, the organization was criticized as redundant, taking over the role of gathering accurate information on the IRS that was previously handled by the General Accounting Office. Concerns over the degree of independence from the IRS, due to the National Taxpayer Advocate still being an IRS employee, rather than separate from the IRS, were raised shortly after establishment.

== See also ==
- Internal Revenue Service Oversight Board
- Independent Office of Appeals
- Treasury Inspector General for Tax Administration
- Tax law
