= Taxpayer Bill of Rights 2 =

- Long title: To amend the Internal Revenue Code of 1986 to provide for increased taxpayer protections.
- Enacted by: the 104th United States Congress

Citations
- Public law: Pub. L. 104–168 (text) (PDF)

Legislative history
- Introduced in the House as H.R. 2337 by Nancy Johnson (R–CT) on September 14, 1995; Committee consideration by United States House Committee on Ways and Means; Signed into law by President Bill Clinton on July 30, 1996

The Taxpayer Bill of Rights 2 (Pub. L. 104–168 (text) (PDF), 110 Stat. 1452, enacted July 30, 1996) is an Act of Congress. Among other things, it created the Office of the Taxpayer Advocate.

The Office of the Taxpayer Advocate was run by the Taxpayer Advocate. The function of the advocate was to do the following:

- Assist taxpayers in resolving problems with the Internal Revenue Service
- Identify areas in which taxpayers have problems in dealings with the Internal Revenue Service
- To the extent possible, propose changes in the administrative practices of the Internal Revenue Service to mitigate problems identified under the clause above
- Identify potential legislative changes which may be appropriate to mitigate such problems.

The Taxpayer Advocate also had to do yearly reports no later than December 31 every year after 1995 which included identifying what the Advocate did to improve services.

== See also ==
- Taxpayer Bill of Rights
- Taxpayer Bill of Rights III
