= Karen Hastie Williams =

American lawyer and company director (1944–2021)

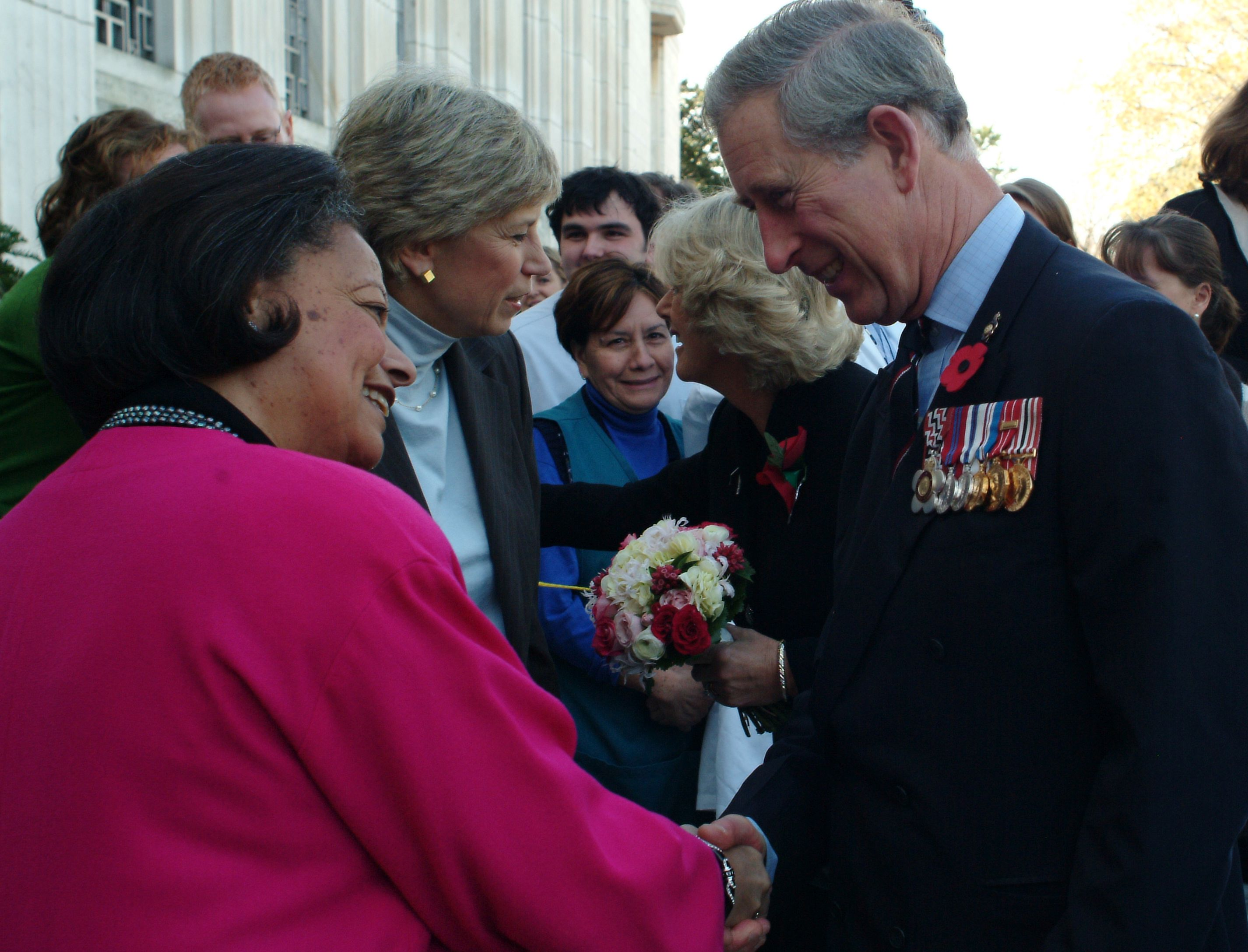
- Williams and Charles Prince of Wales 2005
- Born: Karen Hastie; September 30, 1944; Washington, D.C., U.S.
- Died: July 7, 2021 (aged 76); Washington, D.C., U.S.
- Education: Bates College; Tufts University's Fletcher School of Law and Diplomacy; Catholic University of America
- Spouse: Wesley S. Williams, Jr.
- Children: 3
- Parent: William H. Hastie

Karen Hastie Williams (September 30, 1944 – July 7, 2021) was an American lawyer and company director.

== Early life ==
Hastie Williams was born on September 30, 1944, in Washington, D.C. Her father, William H. Hastie, was the Governor of the U.S. Virgin Islands from 1946 to 1949.

Hastie Williams graduated from Bates College in 1966, where she earned a bachelor's degree. She earned a master's degree from the Fletcher School of Law and Diplomacy at Tufts University in 1967, and a JD from the Catholic University of America's Columbus School of Law in 1973.

== Career ==
Williams clerked for Spottswood William Robinson III in 1973–1974, and for Thurgood Marshall in 1974–1975. She was the first African American woman to serve as a Supreme Court law clerk. She worked for Fried, Frank, Harris, Shriver & Kampelman, and was the first woman and person of colour to become a partner at Crowell & Moring.

Hastie Williams was chief counsel of the United States Senate Committee on the Budget from 1977 to 1980, and administrator for Federal Procurement Policy in the United States Office of Management and Budget from 1980 to 1981, under President Jimmy Carter. She served on the Internal Revenue Service Oversight Board from 2000 to 2003, under President George W. Bush. In the 1980s, Williams helped victims of terrorism to sue countries which sponsored terrorist groups. She is credited with assisting the American journalist Terry Anderson to achieve compensation from the Iranian government, after he was kidnapped in Beirut, Lebanon, and held for over four years by Hezbollah militants.

Hastie Williams was on the board of directors of Chubb Limited from 2000 to 2010, and SunTrust Banks from 2002 to 2011. She was also on the boards of Crestar Bank and the Gannett Company.

== Philanthropy ==
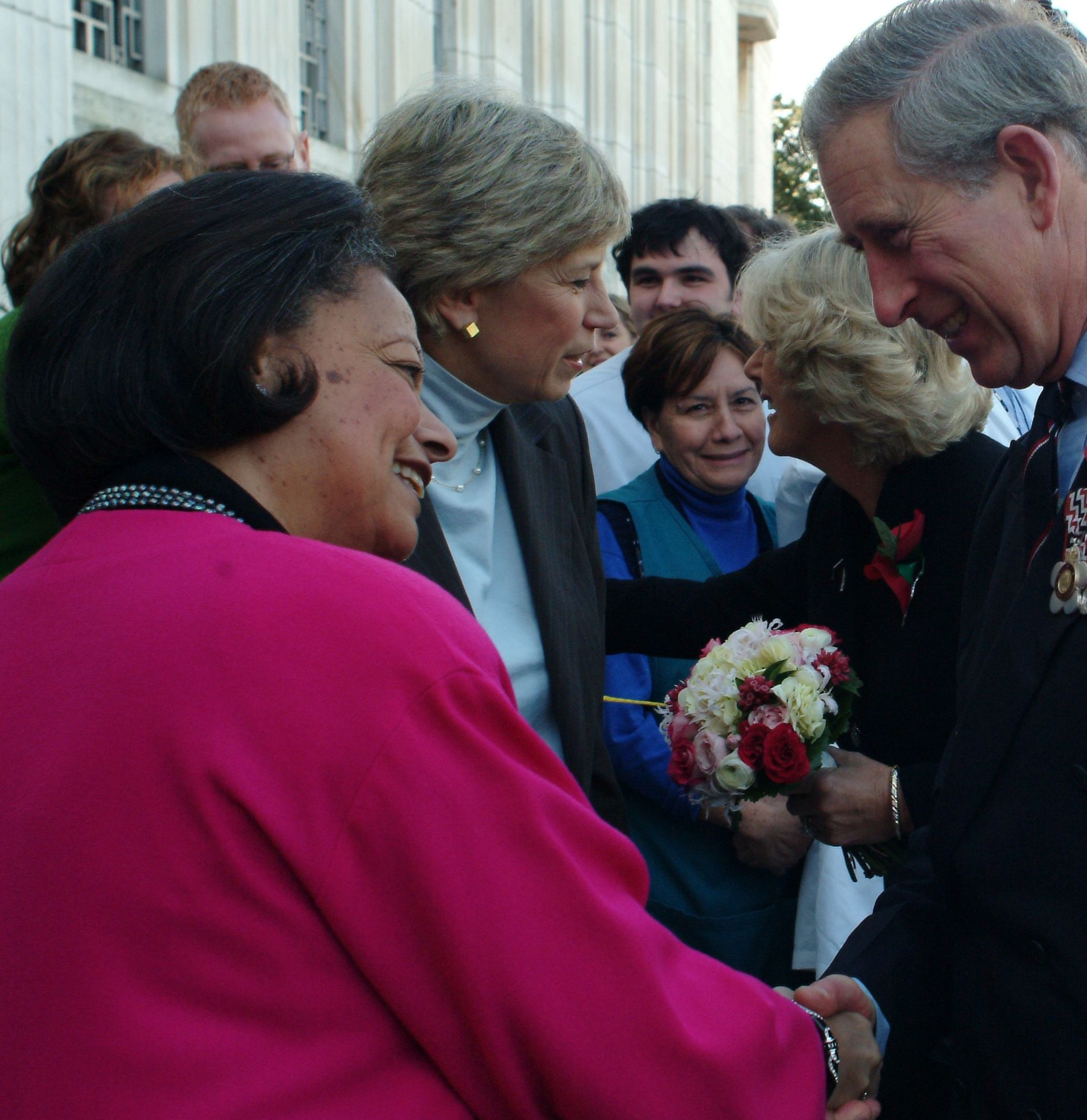
Karen Hastie Williams and Charles, Prince of Wales, at the Folger Shakespeare Library, 4 November 2005

In 2005, Hastie Williams became the first chair of the Folger Shakespeare Library's newly independent board of governors. She also served on the board of the NAACP Legal Defense Fund, and was involved with the Black Student Fund in Washington DC.

== Personal life ==
Hastie Williams was married to Wesley S. Williams Jr., a lawyer and priest. They had three children.

She died on July 7, 2021, at age 76 from Alzheimer's disease.

== See also ==
- List of law clerks for the tenth seat of the Supreme Court of the United States
