= Wesley S. Williams Jr. =

American lawyer

Wesley Samuel Williams Jr.
- Born: November 13, 1942 (age 83); Philadelphia, PA, U.S.
- Education: Taft School; Harvard College; Columbia University Law School; Harvard Law School; Virginia Theological Seminary
- Occupations: Lawyer; Priest
- Employer(s): Covington & Burling; Washington National Cathedral
- Spouse: Karen Hastie Williams (died 2021)
- Children: 3

Wesley Samuel Williams Jr. (born November 13, 1942) is the first African-American to serve both as legal counsel to the United States Senate and president of the Harvard Law School association. He serves as the Cathedral Priest Scholar and Nave Chaplain at the Washington National Cathedral, as well as a member of the Dean Council and Service Rotas.

== Early life ==
Williams was born in Philadelphia, Pennsylvania to Wesley Samuel Williams Sr., the first African-American president of the District of Columbia Board of Education, and Bathrus Bailey, a school teacher, counselor and college professor.

== Career ==
A graduate of the Taft School, Harvard College, Columbia Law School (LLM), the Fletcher School of Law and Diplomacy, Harvard Law School (Juris Doctor), and Virginia Theological Seminary, Williams is a partner at Covington & Burling, and is co-chairman of the board of directors and co-CEO of the Lockhart Company. He served the Episcopal Diocese of the Virgin Islands (U.S. and U.K.), chairing the chaplaincy of the regional hospital and cancer institute on Saint Thomas, U.S. Virgin Islands.

== Personal life ==
He was married to attorney Karen Hastie Williams until her death on July 7, 2021, at age 76 from Alzheimer's disease. They had three children.
