= Taxpayer First Act =

2019 United States law reforming the IRS

- Acronyms (colloquial): TFA
- Enacted by: the 116th United States Congress

Citations
- Public law: Pub. L. 116–25 (text) (PDF)
- Statutes at Large: 133 Stat. 981

Codification
- Titles amended: 26 U.S.C., the Internal Revenue Code of 1986

Legislative history
- Introduced in the House of Representatives as H.R. 3151 by John Lewis (D–GA) on June 6, 2019; Committee consideration by House Ways and Means Committee; House Budget Committee; House Financial Services Committee; Passed the House of Representatives on June 10, 2019 (Voice Vote); Passed the Senate on June 13, 2019 (Voice Vote); Signed into law by President Donald Trump on July 1, 2019

The Taxpayer First Act (Pub. L. 116–25 (text) (PDF), 133 Stat. 981, enacted July 1, 2019) is a law that makes significant reforms to the Internal Revenue Service (IRS).

== Description of provisions ==
The law revises provisions relating to the IRS, its customer service, enforcement procedures, cybersecurity and identity protection, management of information technology, and use of electronic systems.

Specifically, the law:

- codifies the requirement of an independent administrative appeals function by establishing within the IRS an Independent Office of Appeals.
- requires the IRS to develop a comprehensive strategy for customer service.
- makes changes to the process of issuing and addressing Taxpayer Advocate Directives.
- requires that the IRS submit a reorganization plan, after which the structural requirements mandated by RRA 98 no longer apply.
- codifies the Volunteer Income Tax Assistance (VITA) program.
- amended rules for seizure and sale of perishable goods so that they are truly restricted only to perishable goods.
- requires the IRS to work collaboratively with the public and private sectors to protect taxpayers from identity theft tax refund fraud.
- provides that the IRS may participate in an information sharing and analysis center aimed at preventing identity theft tax refund fraud.
- requires that the IRS provide identity protection personal identification numbers to taxpayers who request them (within five years of the law's enactment).
- codifies the role of IRS's Chief Information Officer and requires that the person in that role supervise all of IRS's information technology efforts.
- requires the IRS to create a platform for Form 1099 filings.
- allows the IRS to use streamlined critical pay authority for information technology positions.
- removes the requirement for the IRS to produce an annual report about the development of return-free filing.

== Bill history ==
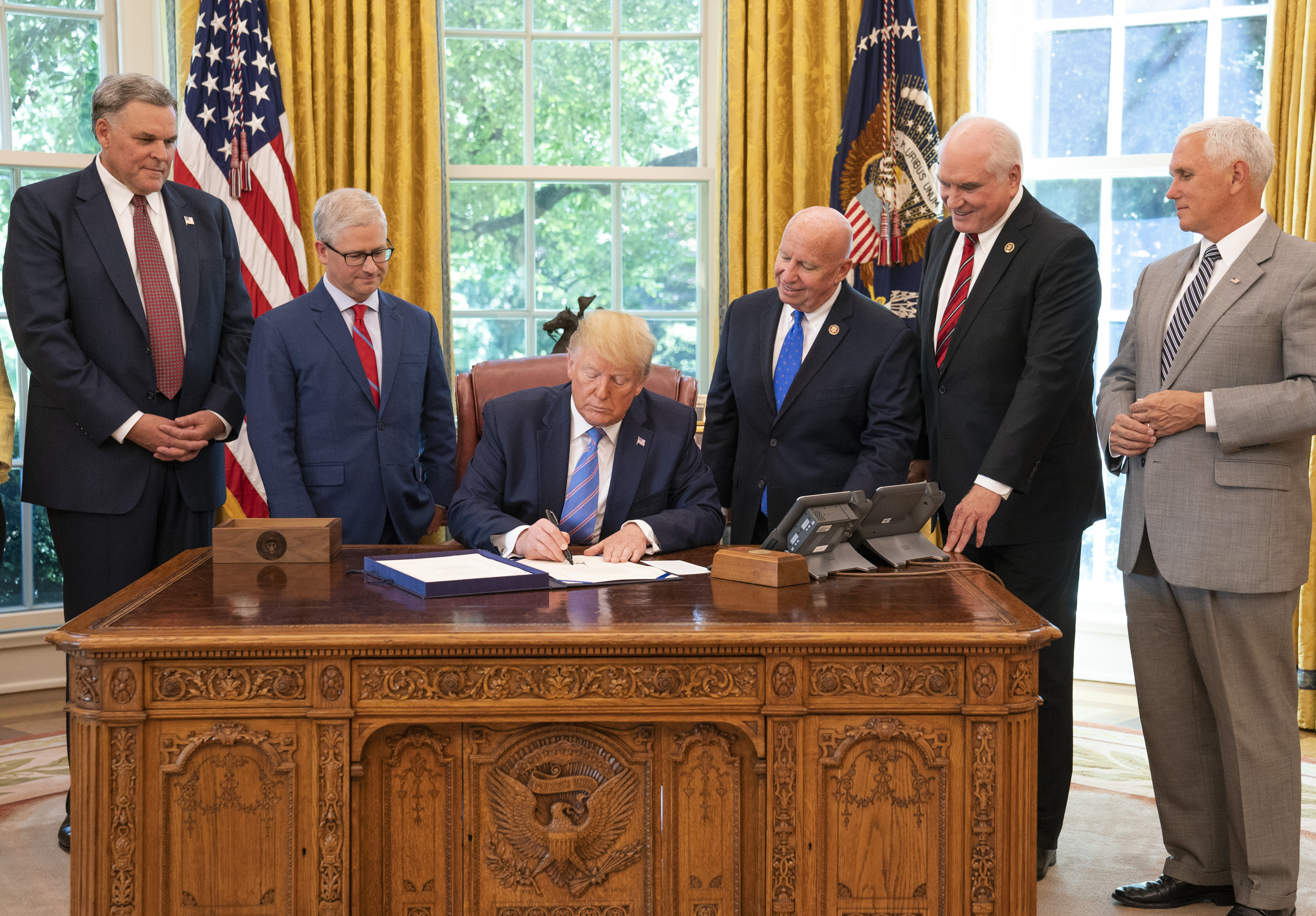
President Trump signs the Taxpayer First Act into law.

On June 24, 2016, House Republicans published a tax reform blueprint that included the goal of reforming the IRS. In 2017, the House Ways and Means Committee began to schedule public hearings, member events, and roundtables on the topic of tax administration reform. On March 26, 2018, the Ways and Means Committee released the first draft of the Taxpayer First Act. On April 18, 2018, the bill passed the House of Representatives unanimously.

On July 19, 2018, the Senate introduced their own bipartisan IRS reform bill. One week later, Senators Portman and Cardin introduced their own competing IRS reform bill.

Neither of the Senate bills were passed at the conclusion of the 115th Congress. As a result, on April 9, 2019, soon after the start of the 116th Congress, the House passed the Taxpayer First Act once again. That bill was expected to pass the Senate, however on April 22, 2019 ProPublica published an exposé heavily criticizing the implementation of the Free File Program, which the bill would codify. The House then removed the Free File provision from the bill, which passed the House and Senate and was then signed by the president.

== Implementation ==
The IRS created a Taxpayer First Act Office to implement the law's provisions. In January 2021, the IRS published a report to Congress addressing several of the law's provisions, including a new organizational structure.
