= Nancy Killefer =

American government consultant and political figure

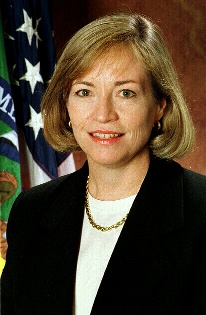

Personal details
- Born: 1953 (age 71–72)
- Education: Vassar College (AB); Massachusetts Institute of Technology (MBA)

Nancy Killefer (born 1953) is an American government consultant and political figure. She was nominated for the Chief Performance Officer position in the Obama administration in 2009. In 2005 the District of Columbia government had filed a more than $900 tax lien on her home for failure to pay state unemployment tax on household help. She resolved the matter five months after the lien was filed. Killefer withdrew her nomination as CPO on February 3, 2009. In March 2020, she joined Facebook and was appointed to the Board of Directors.

== Early life ==
Killefer received her M.B.A. from the MIT Sloan School of Management. She holds an A.B. with honors in economics from Vassar College. Prior to business school, Killefer worked as an associate at Charles River Associates, a microeconomics consulting firm.

== Career ==
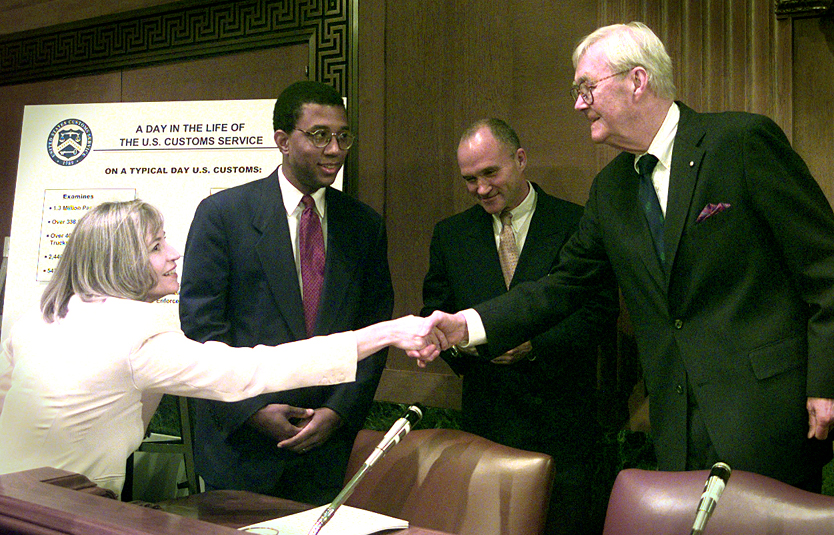
Killefer greeting Daniel Patrick Moynihan in 1999

Nancy Killefer is a Director in the Washington, D.C., office of McKinsey & Company, the global management consultancy. She left McKinsey & Company from 1997 to 2000 to serve as Assistant Secretary for Management, CFO, and COO at the United States Department of the Treasury. After returning to McKinsey in 2000, she joined the IRS Oversight Board, a public-private entity akin to a corporate board that oversees the IRS. She served there from 2000 to 2005 and was its chairperson from 2002 to 2005.

== Personal life ==
Killefer is the granddaughter of long-time major league baseball catcher and manager Bill Killefer.
