= Technical and Miscellaneous Revenue Act of 1988 =

- Long title: An act to make technical corrections relating to the Tax Reform Act of 1986, and for other purposes.
- Enacted by: the 100th United States Congress

Citations
- Public law: Pub. L. 100–647

Legislative history
- Introduced in the House as H.R. 4333 by Dan Rostenkowski (D–IL) on March 31, 1988; Committee consideration by United States House Committee on Ways and Means; Signed into law by President Ronald Reagan on November 10, 1988

The Technical and Miscellaneous Revenue Act of 1988 (TAMRA) (Pub. L. 100–647) made corrections to the Tax Reform Act of 1986 and the Revenue Act of 1987. For example: The 1986 Act introduced the "Kiddie" tax, taxing children under 14 on part of their unearned income at their parent's top marginal rate, unless the tax at the child's marginal rate would be higher. TAMRA allowed parents to elect to include the unearned income of their children under 14 on their own returns.

Subtitle J of the act is named the Omnibus Taxpayer Bill of Rights. This was updated in the 1996 Taxpayer Bill of Rights 2, and the 1998 Taxpayer Bill of Rights III.
