= Internal Revenue Service Oversight Board =

IRS Oversight Board
Board overview
- Status: Suspended
- Headquarters: Treasury Building; 1500 Pennsylvania Avenue, NW; Washington, D.C., U.S
- Website: www.treasury.gov/irsob/Pages/default.aspx (archive url)

The IRS Oversight Board is a nine-member board established by the Internal Revenue Service Restructuring and Reform Act of 1998 to oversee the Internal Revenue Service. It usually meets four times a year.

The board has made recommendations such as delaying the IRS target for taxpayers who file electronically, giving electronic filers more time, and opposing the idea of contracting debt collection to private companies. The board released an Annual Report to Congress as well as an annual Taxpayer Attitude Survey. The survey covered topics such as how Americans felt about cheating on taxes. Some have criticized the group as functioning more as an advisory board, rather than providing meaningful independent oversight.

Operations of the board has been suspended since 2015, due to the lack of a quorum. There are various legislative proposals to revamp the board (S. 3278), or to eliminate it completely (H.R. 5370). Senators Rob Portman and Bob Kerrey, who were involved in writing the 1998 bill, both supported revamping the board, but were strongly opposed by the Clinton administration. The president of the National Taxpayers Union also supports restoring the board.

== Membership ==
Board members consist of the United States Secretary of the Treasury, the Commissioner of Internal Revenue, and seven other members appointed by the President of the United States. Members are appointed to five year terms, with the exception of the very first appointments, so that terms are staggered.

President Bill Clinton began nominations in June 1999, after some delay. The seven nominations were approved by the United States Senate Committee on Finance in August 2000. These seven individuals were confirmed by the senate in September 2000:

- George L. Farr (4 year term)
- Chares L. Kolbe (3 year term)
- Nancy Killefer (5 year term)
- Larry R. Levitan (5 year term)
- Steve Nickels (4 year term)
- Robert Tobias (5 year term)
- Karen Hastie Williams (3 year term)

Following a returned nomination in 2002, in April 2003, Raymond T. Wagner was confirmed to the board for the remainder of George L. Farr's four year term. Wagner's appointment for an additional five year term was confirmed in March 2005.

In July 2004, following the expiration of his first term, Charles L. Kolbe was confirmed to take over the remaining time in the 4 year term of Steve H. Nickles, who had resigned.

In November 2004, Paul Jones was confirmed to a five year term in Charles L. Kolbe's initial seat.

In December 2006, Paul Cherecwich Jr. was confirmed to take up Charles L. Kolbe's second former seat on the board. Deborah L. Wince-Smith was also confirmed to take up Larry L. Levitan's former seat on the board.

On the recommendation of senator Max Baucus, George W. Bush appointed Edwin Eck to take up Karen Hastie Williams' former seat on the board. Eck's appointment was approved by the senate in July 2008. Eck's reappointment for a five year term was confirmed in October 2008.

=== Leadership ===
The board elects a chairman for two year terms.

IRS Oversight Board Chairman/Chairwoman
Name	Term
Larry R. Levitan	2000–2002
Nancy Killefer	2002–2004
Raymond T. Wagner, Jr.	2004–2006
Paul Jones, Jr.	?
Paul Cherecwich, Jr.	2007–
