= Nina E. Olson =

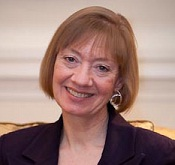
- Education: Bryn Mawr College (BA); North Carolina Central University (JD); Georgetown University (LLM)

Nina E. Olson is a former United States Taxpayer Advocate, and former head of the Office of the Taxpayer Advocate, a government office dedicated to helping taxpayers solve their problems with the Internal Revenue Service. From 1975 to 1991, she was a tax preparer in Chapel Hill, North Carolina.

She "is an adjunct professor at Harvard University, where teaches an annual half-day seminar about tax matters."

== National Taxpayer Advocate duties ==
As the National Taxpayer Advocate, Olson was the only Internal Revenue Service (IRS) employee authorized to make legislative proposals directly to the United States Congress. Twice a year, she identified the top problems taxpayers face to the IRS and Congress, and analysed how the IRS can ameliorate those problems. "No one in the treasury department and no IRS employees, including the Commissioner of Revenue and anyone from the Office of Management and Budget, can see the report before I deliver it to Congress," Olson said, "I am truly an independent voice inside the IRS."

In 2014, Olson predicted that the 2015 "filing season is going to be the worst filing season since I’ve been the National Taxpayer Advocate; I’d love to be proved wrong, but I think it will rival the 1985 filing season when returns disappeared." According to an article in January 2015 in Politico, the annual report of the Taxpayer Advocate to Congress indicated that IRS service was deteriorating to unprecedented poor levels in all aspects of its work, mainly in pre-filing and filing activities and also in its enforcement activities. Congress removed 17 percent from the IRS budget since fiscal 2010 when adjusted for inflation while the agency was dealing with more tax returns than ever before. Each year, the IRS answers phone calls from about 100 million people. In 2015, the IRS was also implementing Obamacare.
