= Internal Revenue Service =

Revenue service of the U.S. federal government

- IRS seal

- IRS logo

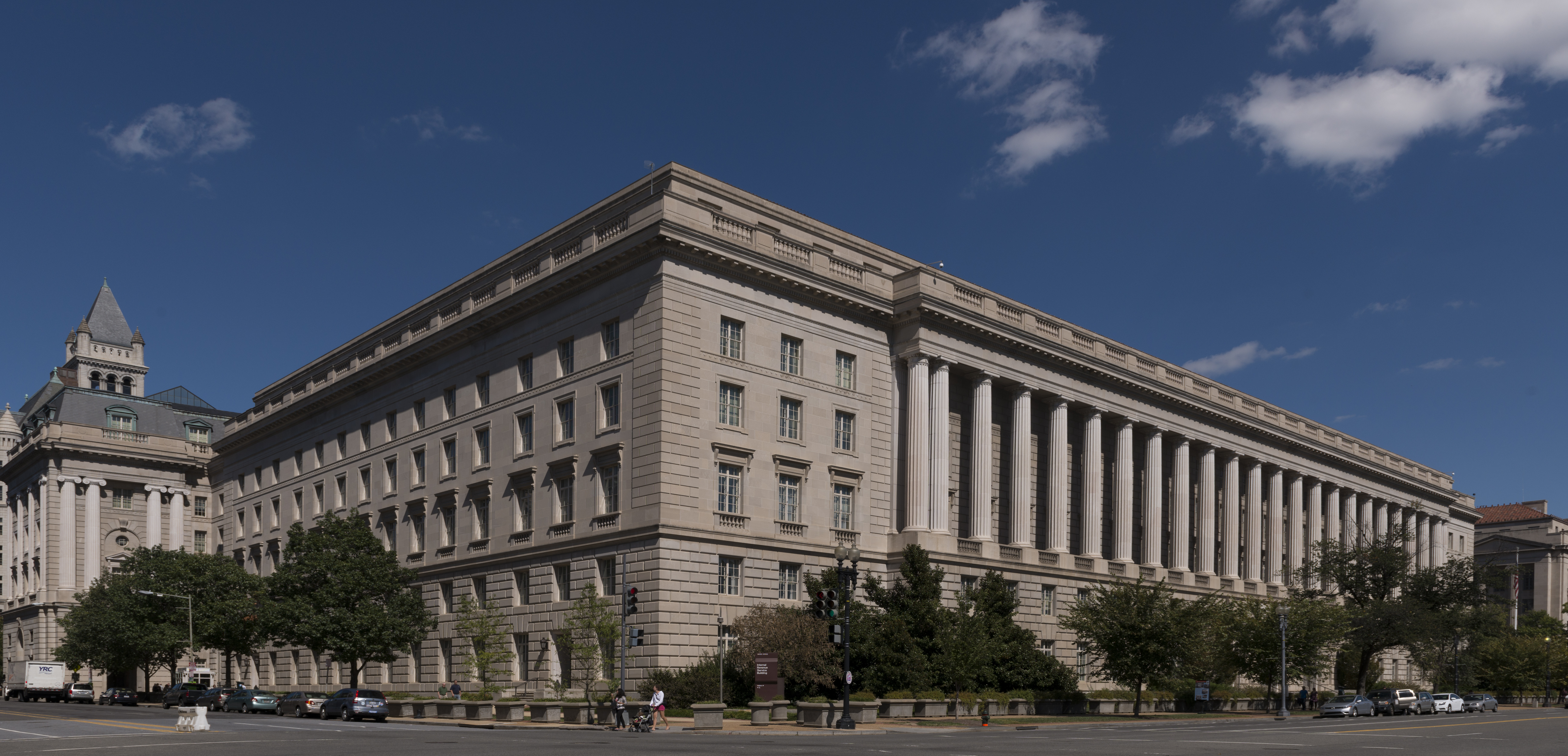
- The Internal Revenue Service Building in 2012

Agency overview
- Formed: July 1, 1862; 164 years ago (as Office of Commissioner of Internal Revenue)
- Type: Revenue service
- Jurisdiction: Federal government of the United States
- Headquarters: Internal Revenue Service Building 1111 Constitution Ave., NW Washington, D.C. 20224 United States
- Employees: 90,516 (74,299 FTE) (2025)
- Annual budget: $14.3 billion (2022)
- Agency executives: Vacant, Commissioner of Internal Revenue; Vacant, Deputy Commissioner; Frank Bisignano, "Chief Executive Officer"
- Parent agency: United States Department of the Treasury
- Website: irs.gov

The Internal Revenue Service (IRS) is the revenue service of the U.S. federal government. It is responsible for collecting U.S. federal taxes and for administering the Internal Revenue Code, the main body of U.S. federal statutory tax law. It is an agency of the U.S. Department of the Treasury and is led by the commissioner of internal revenue, who is appointed to a five-year term by the president of the United States. The duties of the IRS include providing tax assistance to taxpayers; pursuing and resolving instances of erroneous or fraudulent tax filings; and overseeing various benefits programs, including the Affordable Care Act.

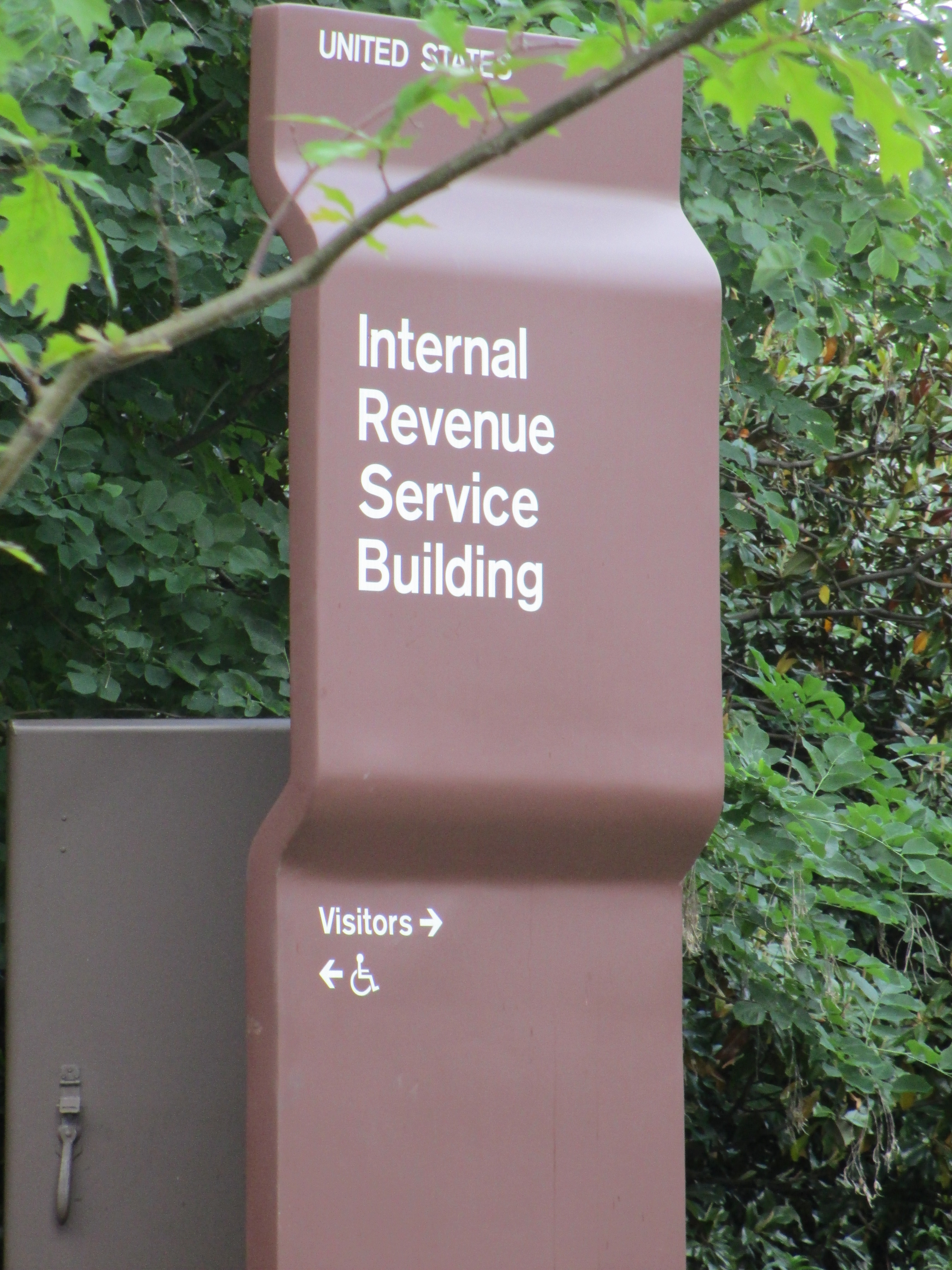
IRS location sign at Constitution Avenue, Washington, D.C.

The IRS originates from the Office of Commissioner of Internal Revenue, a federal office created in 1862 to assess the nation's first income tax to fund the American Civil War. The temporary measure funded over a fifth of the Union's war expenses before being allowed to expire a decade later. In 1913, the Sixteenth Amendment to the U.S. Constitution was ratified, authorizing Congress to impose a tax on income and leading to the creation of the Bureau of Internal Revenue. In 1953, the agency was renamed the Internal Revenue Service, and in subsequent decades underwent numerous reforms and reorganizations, most significantly in the 1990s.

Since its establishment, the IRS has been largely responsible for collecting the revenue needed to fund the United States federal government, with the rest being funded either through U.S. Customs and Border Protection (collecting duties and tariffs) or the Federal Reserve (purchasing U.S. treasuries). The IRS has faced criticism for its history of politically targeted audits, paying bonuses to IRS employees with tax debts, disproportionately auditing poor and minority taxpayers, its handling of the COVID-19 stimulus payments, and taxation generally. In recent years, the agency has struggled with budget cuts, under-staffed workforce, outdated technology and reduced morale, all of which collectively result in the inappropriate enforcement of tax laws against high earners and large corporations, reduced tax collection, rising deficits, lower spending on important priorities, or further tax increases on compliant taxpayers to compensate for lost revenue. Research shows that IRS audits raise revenue, both through the initial audit and indirectly by deterring future tax cheating. According to a 2024 study, "an additional $1 spent auditing taxpayers above the 90th income percentile yields more than $12 in revenue, while audits of below-median income taxpayers yield $5."

As of 2018, it saw a 15 percent reduction in its workforce, including a decline of more than 25 percent of its enforcement staff. During the 2023 fiscal year, the agency processed more than 271.4 million tax returns including more than 163.1 million individual income tax returns. For FY 2023, the IRS collected approximately $4.7 trillion, which is approximately 96 percent of the operational funding for the federal government.

== History ==
=== American Civil War (1861–1865) ===
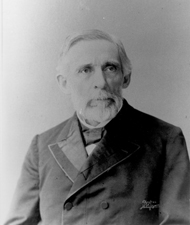
George S. Boutwell was the first Commissioner of Internal Revenue under President Abraham Lincoln.

In July 1862, during the American Civil War, President Abraham Lincoln and Congress passed the Revenue Act of 1862, creating the office of commissioner of internal revenue and enacting a temporary income tax to pay war expenses.

The Revenue Act of 1862 was passed as an emergency and temporary war-time tax. It copied a relatively new British system of income taxation, instead of trade and property taxation. The first income tax was passed in 1862:

- The initial rate was 3% on income over $800, which exempted most wage-earners.
- In 1862 the rate was 3% on income between $600 and $10,000, and 5% on income over $10,000.

By the end of the war, 10% of Union households had paid some form of income tax, and the Union raised 21% of its war revenue through income taxes.

=== Post Civil War, Reconstruction, and popular tax reform (1866–1913) ===
After the Civil War, Reconstruction, railroads, and transforming the North and South war machines towards peacetime required public funding. However, in 1872, seven years after the war, lawmakers allowed the temporary Civil War income tax to expire.

Income taxes evolved, but in 1894 the Supreme Court declared the Income Tax of 1894 unconstitutional in Pollock v. Farmers' Loan & Trust Co., a decision that contradicted Hylton v. United States. The federal government scrambled to raise money.

In 1906, with the election of President Theodore Roosevelt, and later his successor William Howard Taft, the United States saw a populist movement for tax reform. This movement culminated during then-candidate Woodrow Wilson's election of 1912 and in February 1913, the ratification of the Sixteenth Amendment to the United States Constitution:

The Congress shall have power to lay and collect taxes on incomes, from whatever source derived, without apportionment among the several States, and without regard to any census or enumeration.

This granted Congress the specific power to impose an income tax without regard to apportionment among the states by population. By February 1913, 36 states had ratified the change to the Constitution. It was further ratified by six more states by March. Of the 48 states at the time, 42 ratified it. Connecticut, Rhode Island, and Utah rejected the amendment; Pennsylvania, Virginia, and Florida did not take up the issue.

=== Post 16th Amendment (1913–present) ===
Though the constitutional amendment to allow the federal government to collect income taxes was proposed by President Taft in 1909, the 16th Amendment was not ratified until 1913, just before the start of the First World War. That same year, the first edition of the 1040 form was introduced. A copy of the 1913 form can be viewed online and shows that only those with annual incomes of at least $3,000 (equivalent to $97,700 in 2025) were instructed to file an income tax return.

In the first year after the ratification of the 16th Amendment, no taxes were collected. Instead, taxpayers simply completed the form and the IRS checked the form for accuracy. The IRS's workload jumped by ten-fold, triggering a massive restructuring. Professional tax collectors began to replace a system of "patronage" appointments. The IRS doubled its staff but was still processing 1917 returns in 1919.

Income tax raised much of the money required to finance the war effort; in 1918 a new Revenue Act established a top tax rate of 77%.

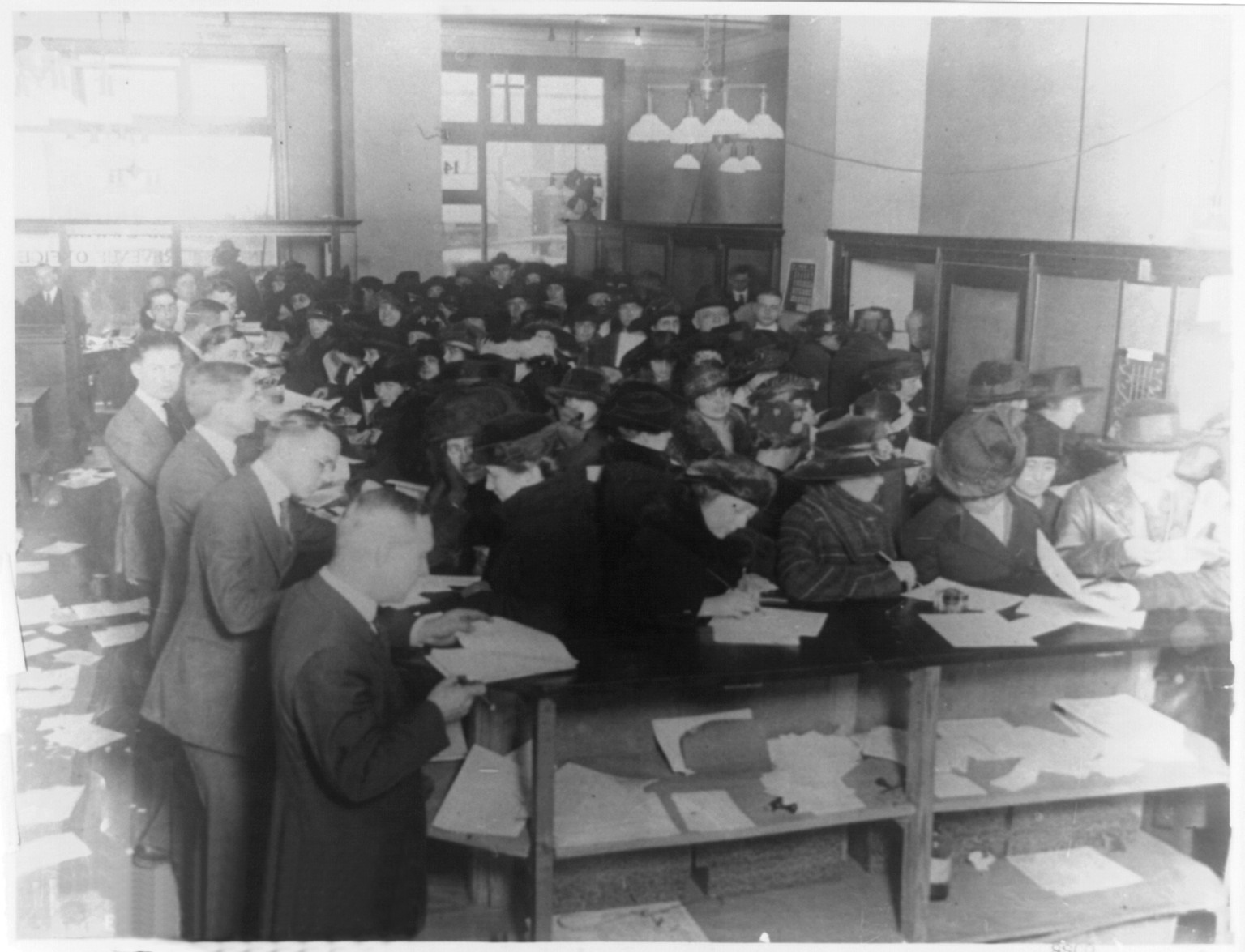
People filing tax forms in 1920

In 1919 the IRS was tasked with enforcement of laws relating to prohibition of alcohol sales and manufacture; this was transferred to the jurisdiction of the Department of Justice in 1930. After repeal in 1933, the IRS resumed collection of taxes on beverage alcohol. The alcohol, tobacco and firearms activities of the bureau were segregated into the Bureau of Alcohol, Tobacco, Firearms and Explosives in 1972.

A new tax act was passed in 1942 as the United States entered the Second World War. This act included a special wartime surcharge. The number of American citizens who paid income tax increased from about four million in 1939 to more than forty-two million by 1945.

In 1952, after a series of politically damaging incidents of tax evasion and bribery among its own employees, the Bureau of Internal Revenue was reorganized under a plan put forward by President Truman, with the approval of Congress. The reorganization decentralized many functions to new district offices which replaced the collector's offices. Civil service directors were appointed to replace the politically appointed collectors of the Bureau of Internal Revenue. Not long after, the bureau was renamed the Internal Revenue Service.

In 1954 the filing deadline was moved from March 15 to April 15.

The Tax Reform Act of 1969 created the Alternative Minimum Tax.

In 1969, Richard Nixon directed the IRS to audit his political opponents, as well as opponents of US involvement in the Vietnam War. The IRS's Activist Organizations Committee, later renamed the Special Services Staff, created a target list of more than 1,000 organizations and 4,000 individuals. A White House memo said that "What we cannot do in a courtroom via criminal prosecutions to curtail the activities of some of these groups, IRS can do by administrative action." The then commissioner Randolph W. Thrower resisted Nixon's request to audit his political enemies and was later fired. Thrower's successor, Johnnie Mac Walters chose to lock the list in his safe and deliver it to the Congress after the Watergate Scandal broke out.

By 1986, limited electronic filing of tax returns was possible.

The Internal Revenue Service Restructuring and Reform Act of 1998 ("RRA 98") changed the organization from geographically oriented to an organization based on four operating divisions. It added "10 deadly sins" that require immediate termination of IRS employees found to have committed certain misconduct.

Enforcement activities declined. The IRS Oversight Board noted that the decline in enforcement activities has "rais[ed] questions about tax compliance and fairness to the vast majority of citizens who pay all their taxes". In June 2012, the IRS Oversight Board recommended to Treasury a fiscal year 2014 budget of $13.074 billion for the Internal Revenue Service.

On December 20, 2017, Congress passed the Tax Cuts and Jobs Act of 2017. It was signed into law by President Trump on December 22, 2017.

In the three decades since 1991, the IRS had a substantial decrease in the number of employees per million residents, decreasing from 451 (in 1991) to 237 (in 2021). A decrease of 47.5 percent.

=== Presidential tax returns (1973) ===
From the 1950s through the 1970s, the IRS began using technology such as microfilm to keep and organize records. Access to this information proved controversial, when President Richard Nixon's tax returns were leaked to the public. His tax advisor, Edward L. Morgan, became the fourth law-enforcement official to be charged with a crime during Watergate.

John Requard Jr., accused of leaking the Nixon tax returns, collected delinquent taxes in the slums of Washington. In his words: "We went after people for nickels and dimes, many of them poor and in many cases illiterate people who didn't know how to deal with a government agency." Requard admitted that he saw the returns but denied that he leaked them.

Reporter Jack White of The Providence Journal won the Pulitzer Prize for reporting about Nixon's tax returns. Nixon, with a salary of $200,000, paid $792.81 in federal income tax in 1970 and $878.03 in 1971, with deductions of $571,000 for donating "vice-presidential papers". This was one of the reasons for his famous statement: "Well, I'm not a crook. I've earned everything I've got."

So controversial was this leak, that most later US presidents released their tax returns (though sometimes only partially). These returns can be found online at the Tax History Project.

=== Computerization, 1955–1999 ===
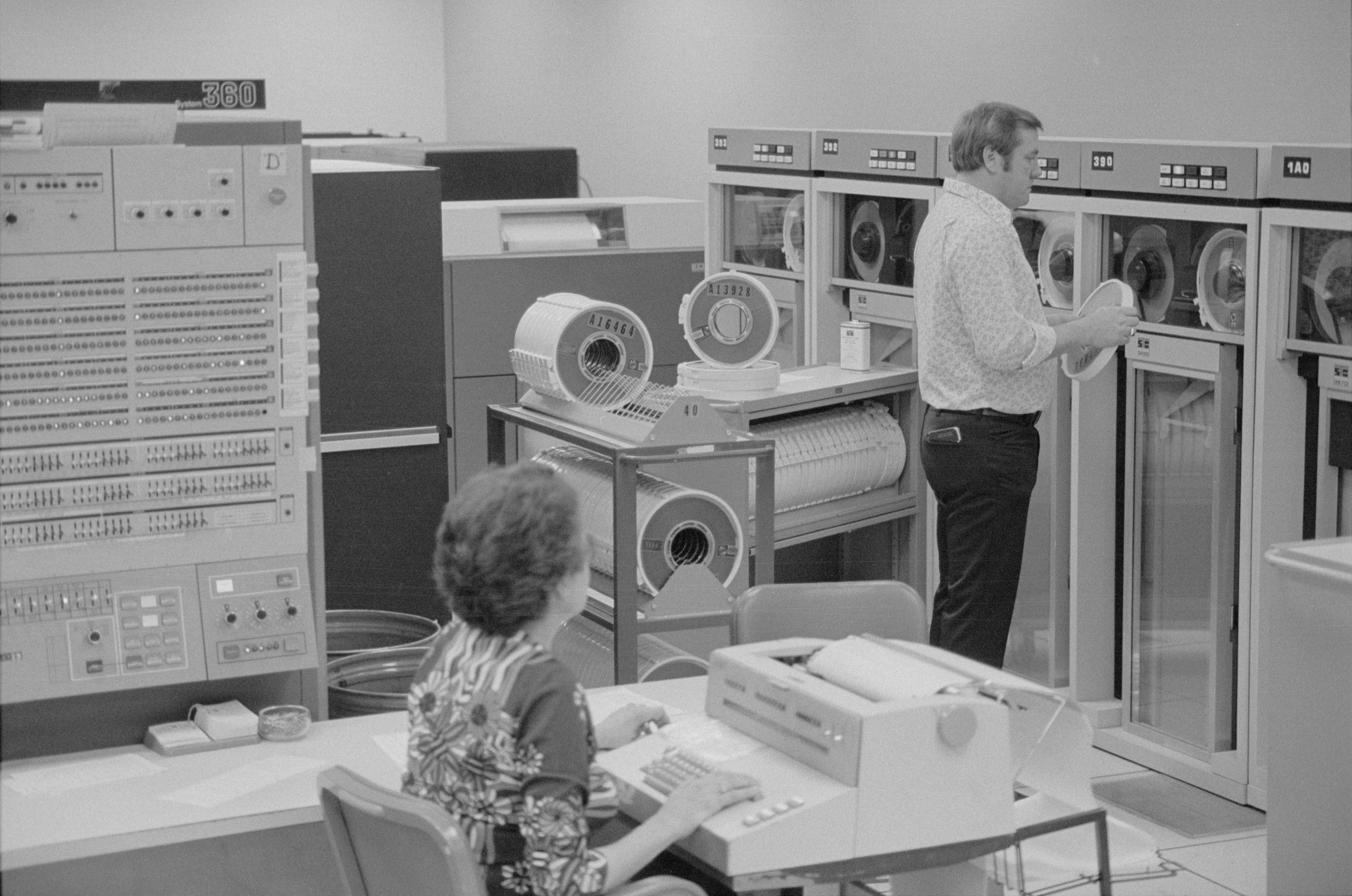
An IBM System/360 in use at the IRS Computing Center in Martinsburg, West Virginia, 1977

By the end of the Second World War, the IRS was handling sixty million tax returns each year, using a combination of mechanical desk calculators, accounting machines, and pencil and paper forms. In 1948, punch card equipment was used. The first trial of a computer system for income tax processing was in 1955, when an IBM 650 installed at Kansas City processed 1.1 million returns. The IRS was authorized to proceed with computerization in 1959 and purchased IBM 1401 and IBM 7070 systems for local and regional data processing centers. The Social Security number was used for taxpayer identification starting in 1965. By 1967, all returns were processed by computer and punched card data entry was phased out.

Information processing in the IRS systems of the late 1960s was in batch mode; microfilm records were updated weekly and distributed to regional centers for handling tax inquiries. A project to implement an interactive, realtime system, the "Tax Administration System", was launched, that would provide thousands of local interactive terminals at IRS offices. However, the General Accounting Office prepared a report critical of the lack of protection of privacy in TAS, and the project was abandoned in 1978.

In 1995, the IRS began to use the public Internet for electronic filing. Since the introduction of e-filing, self-paced online tax services have flourished, augmenting the work of tax accountants, who were sometimes replaced.

=== 2000–2010 ===
By 2002, more than a third of all tax returns were filed electronically. This led to a decline in the number of paper returns being processed each year. As a result, the IRS implemented a consolidation plan for its paper tax return processing centers, closing five of its ten processing centers between 2003 and 2011. The agency closed two more centers – one in 2019 and another in 2021 – as e-file use continued to expand. E-filed tax returns accounted for 90% of all returns submitted during the 2021 filing season.

In 2003, the IRS struck a deal with tax software vendors: The IRS would not develop online filing software and, in return, software vendors would provide free e-filing to most Americans. In 2009, 70% of filers qualified for free electronic filing of federal returns.

=== 2010–2020 ===
According to an inspector general's report, released in November 2013, identity theft in the United States is blamed for $4 billion worth of fraudulent 2012 tax refunds by the IRS. Fraudulent claims were made with the use of stolen taxpayer identification and Social Security numbers, with returns sent to addresses both in the US and internationally. Following the release of the findings, the IRS stated that it resolved most of the identity theft cases of 2013 within 120 days, while the average time to resolve cases from the 2011/2012 tax period was 312 days.

In September 2014, IRS commissioner John Koskinen expressed concern over the organization's ability to handle the Affordable Care Act and administer premium tax credits that help people pay for health plans from the health law's insurance exchanges. It will also enforce the law's individual mandate, which requires most Americans to hold health insurance. In January 2015, Fox News obtained an email which predicted a messy tax season on several fronts. The email was sent by IRS Commissioner Koskinen to workers. Koskinen predicted the IRS would shut down operations for two days later that year which would result in unpaid furloughs for employees and service cuts for taxpayers. Koskinen also said delays to IT investments of more than $200 million may delay new taxpayer protections against identity theft. Also in January 2015, the editorial board of The New York Times called the IRS budget cuts penny-wise-and-pound-foolish, where for every dollar of cuts in the budget, six were lost in tax revenue.

A 2020 Treasury Department audit found the IRS had improved its identity verification system offerings for taxpayers, but was still behind in fully meeting digital identity requirements. The following year, the IRS announced a new login and ID verification process for several of its online tools, including general account access, Identity Protection (IP) PIN setup, and payment plan applications. As part of the agency's Identity, Credential, and Access Management (ICAM) initiative, the process included the use of third-party facial recognition technologies to confirm taxpayer identities.

=== 2021–present ===
The facial recognition requirement was dropped in 2022, however, following privacy concerns from government officials and the public. Alternative ID verification options have since been introduced with the goal of making IRS online tools accessible to more people.

=== History of the IRS name ===
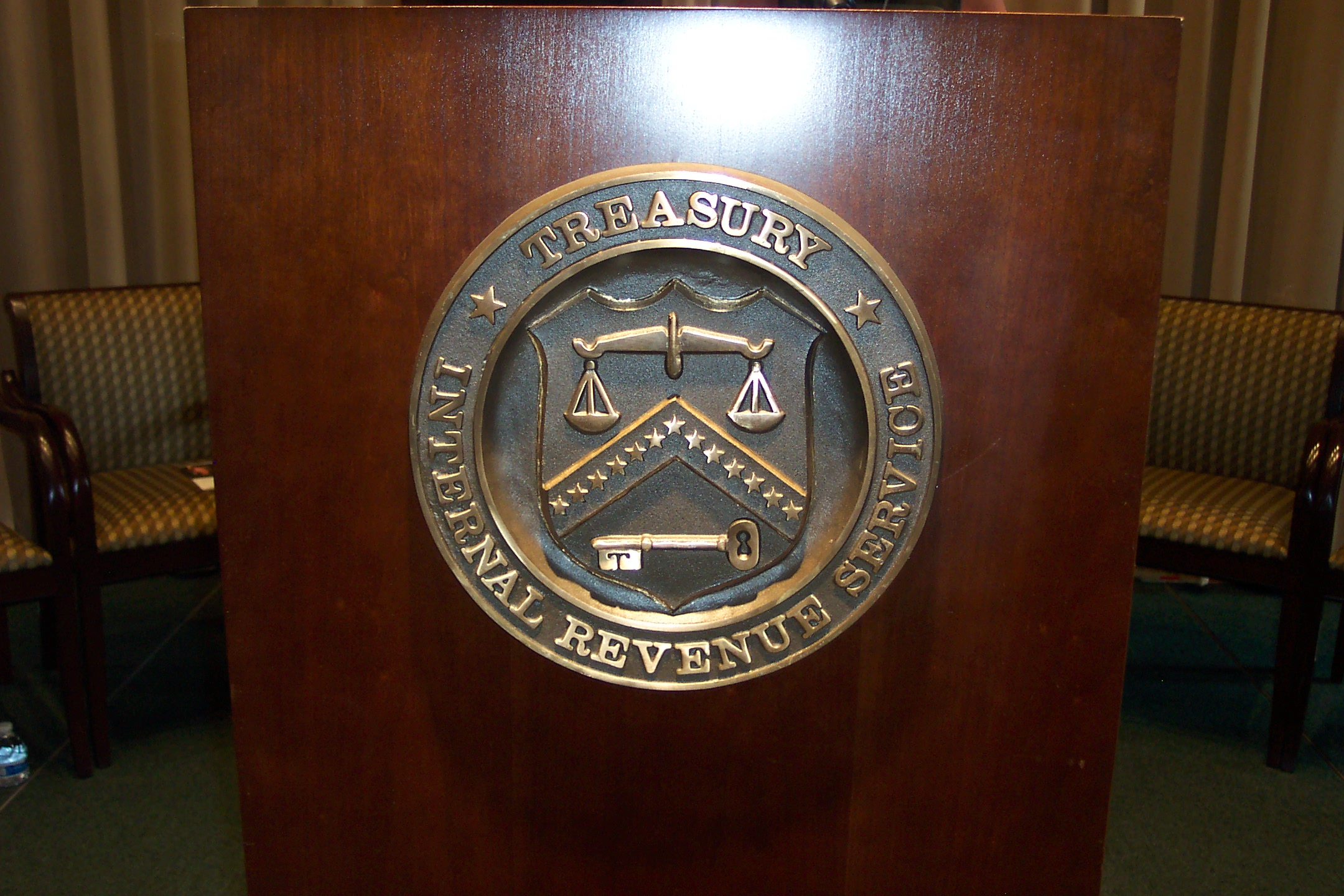
IRS and Department of the Treasury seal on lectern

As early as the year 1918, the Bureau of Internal Revenue began using the name "Internal Revenue Service" on at least one tax form. In 1953, the name change to the "Internal Revenue Service" was formalized in Treasury Decision 6038.

== Organization since the 1950s ==
The 1953 reorganization established the IRS as its own agency within Treasury, eliminating five political appointees overseeing internal revenue and leaving only the commissioner as a political appointee, nominated by the President and confirmed by the Senate.

== 1998 restructuring ==
The 1980s saw a reorganization of the IRS. A bipartisan commission was created with several mandates, among them to increase customer service and improve collections. Congress later enacted the Internal Revenue Service Restructuring and Reform Act of 1998, which mandated that the agency replace its geographic regional divisions with units that serve particular categories of taxpayers.

As a result, the IRS now functions under four major operating divisions:

- Large Business and International (LB&I)
- Small Business/Self-Employed (SB/SE)
- Taxpayer Services (TS)
- Tax Exempt & Government Entities (TE/GE)

The Large Business & International (LB&I) division was known as the Large and Mid-Size Business division prior to a name change on October 1, 2010.

The 1998 law also established the IRS Oversight Board, made the IRS Chief Counsel the second and only other IRS Presidential political appointee, and established the Office of the Taxpayer Advocate, under a National Taxpayer Advocate appointed by the Secretary of the Treasury.

Under both the Biden and second Trump administrations, the IRS underwent further reorganizations. The reorganization during the Biden administration implemented the 2019 Taxpayer First Act and the IRS provisions of the Inflation Reduction Act, consolidating two deputy commissioners into one role, and other changes.

== Reorganization under the second Trump administration ==
Unlike previous reorganization, the major IRS reorganization during the second Trump administration has not been authorized by Congress or formally justified.

Project 2025 called for the elimination of civil-service protections for IRS employees and making the top IRS officials Presidential appointees.

In January 2025, Trump signed an executive order issuing an indefinite hiring freeze for the agency.

On February 13, 2025, employees of the "Department of Government Efficiency" (DOGE) initiative entered the IRS, whose parent agency is the Department of Treasury (USDT). Two days later, DOGE was seeking access to the Integrated Data Retrieval System. USDT (through IRS) has the names, addresses, social security numbers of taxpayers, their income and net worth, bank information for direct deposits, itemization details such as charitable donations, bankruptcy history or identity theft.

Near the end of February, 6,700 probationary employees (those employed for less than a year) were from the IRS by DOGE. Elon Musk tweeted "deleted" in reference to 18F, the agency which had helped create the free service Direct File. That April, it was announced Direct File had been discontinued. Senator Elizabeth Warren described this as "a massive handout to giant tax prep companies".

DOGE members pressured IRS officials to hand over sensitive taxpayer data access to immigration agencies; IRS employees repeatedly refused to do so, as this is illegal. That April, after what was described by a former IRS employee as a "hostile takeover" of the agency by DOGE, it was announced that the IRS had reached agreement to share taxpayer information with Immigration and Customs Enforcement (ICE) for the purpose of locating "suspected undocumented immigrants". By August, the IRS had disclosed tens of thousands of taxpayer records to ICE, including personally identifying information and home addresses. ICE had made over 1 million requests for records. Following a lawsuit brought by a coalition of small businesses and labor unions and the Center for Taxpayer Rights, in November 2025 a federal judge blocked the IRS from further record-sharing with ICE or DHS. This injuction against data sharing was upheld by the D.C Circuit Court of Appeals in September 2026.

In October of 2025, the Senate-confirmed positions of commissioner and civil-servant deputy commissioner were effectively replaced by a non-confirmed "CEO" political appointee. This new position was filled by Frank Bisignano, who is also the commissioner of the Social Security Administration, a role for which the Senate had confirmed him earlier that May. Experts described this as an attempt to sidestep the Constitutional requirement that the Senate confirm all major executive branch appointments, and expressed concern about the IRS's independence under this arrangement.

== Offices and facilities ==
The IRS is headquartered in Washington, D.C., and does most of its computer programming in Maryland. It processes paper tax returns sent by mail and e-filed tax returns at three IRS center locations: Austin, Texas; Kansas City, Missouri; and Ogden, Utah.

The IRS also operates computer centers in three locations: Detroit, Michigan; Martinsburg, West Virginia; and Memphis, Tennessee.

=== Commissioner ===
On December 4, 2024, President-elect Donald Trump announced his intention to nominate Billy Long to serve as Commissioner of the Internal Revenue Service. Long was confirmed by the U.S. Senate in June 2025, and took office in July. In August, Long was removed by Trump in preparation for an ambassadorship to Iceland; the next acting commissioner, Treasury Secretary Scott Bessent, was appointed on August 8, 2025, and served until March 6, 2026. The official duties of the commissioner devolved to Bessent in his role as Treasury Secretary. As of April 2026, seven officials have served as acting commissioner since the beginning of the second presidency of Donald Trump, which is historically without precedent. The office is was effectively replaced by a "Chief Executive Officer," a position announced in fall 2025, which, unlike the role of commissioner, is not subject to congressional approval.

No IRS commissioner has served more than five years and one month since Guy Helvering, who served for 10 years, ending in 1943.

=== "Chief Executive Officer" ===
On October 6, 2025, the Department of the Treasury announced the creation of a new politically appointed leadership role within the IRS, titled "Chief Executive Officer" (CEO). The position was established administratively, without authorization from Congress. According to the announcement, the CEO reports directly to the Commissioner of Internal Revenue. The same announcement named Frank Bisignano, who also serves as Commissioner of the Social Security Administration, as the first individual to hold the role. Bisignano was tasked with managing IRS operations. The creation of the CEO role does not replace the statutory authority of the Commissioner of Internal Revenue, which remains the head of the IRS under federal law. The Department of the Treasury stated that the position was designed to strengthen operational efficiency, improve customer service, and support modernization efforts within the agency.

However, as of 2026, the position of commissioner of the IRS remains vacant; the newly created position of "CEO" is understood by tax policy experts as having de-facto replaced the role of Senate-confirmed IRS commissioner, in violation of statute and the Appointments Clause of the Constitution. Members of Congress and journalists refer to him as the "commissioner", "IRS chief", and "head of the IRS".

In January 2026, Bisignano announced that 16 IRS executives would report to him directly, including the Taxpayer Advocate and the acting Chief Counsel.

=== Chief counsel ===
The Chief Counsel is appointed by the President of the United States with the advice and consent of the U.S. Senate. As the chief legal advisor to the IRS Commissioner on all matters pertaining to the interpretation, administration and enforcement of the Internal Revenue Laws (as well as all other legal matters) the Chief Counsel provides legal guidance and interpretive advice to the IRS, Treasury and to taxpayers.

During the second Trump administration, there has been no Senate-confirmed chief counsel; instead, an acting chief counsel has been a political appointee, who reports to the IRS "CEO".

=== Deputy commissioner ===
The commissioner of internal revenue is assisted by the deputy commissioner, a civil-service position. As of February 2025, the position is vacant. In January 2026, the position was unofficially eliminated.

Before 2024, there were two deputy commissioners who reported directly to the commissioner, one for operations support and one for services and enforcement. The deputy commissioner for operations support oversaw the IRS's integrated support functions, working to facilitate economy of scale efficiencies and better business practices. The deputy also administered and provided executive leadership for customer service, processing, tax law enforcement and financial management operations. Additionally, the deputy in this position assisted and acted on behalf of the IRS commissioner in directing, coordinating and controlling the policies, programs and activities of the IRS. This includes establishing tax administration policy and developing strategic issues and objectives for IRS strategic management. The deputy commissioner for services and enforcement oversaw the four primary operating divisions responsible for the major customer segments and other taxpayer-facing functions. The deputy commissioner for services and enforcement served as the IRS commissioner's essential assistant acting on behalf of the commissioner in establishing and enforcing tax administration policy and helping Americans understand and meet their tax responsibilities.

At the end of 2023, then-Commissioner Danny Werfel announced the first major reorganization of the IRS in two decades, consolidating the two roles.

=== Office of the Taxpayer Advocate ===
The Office of the Taxpayer Advocate, also called the Taxpayer Advocate Service, is an independent office within the IRS responsible for assisting taxpayers in resolving their problems with the IRS and identifying systemic problems that exist within the IRS. The current head of the organization, known as the United States Taxpayer Advocate and appointed by the Secretary of the Treasury, is Erin M. Collins.

In 2025, the Taxpayer Advocate began reporting to the IRS CEO.

=== Independent Office of Appeals ===
The Independent Office of Appeals is an independent organization within the IRS that helps taxpayers resolve their tax disputes through an informal, administrative process. Its mission is to resolve tax controversies fairly and impartially, without litigation. Resolution of a case in Appeals "could take anywhere from 90 days to a year". The current chief is Donna C. Hansberry.

=== Office of Professional Responsibility (OPR) ===
OPR investigates suspected misconduct by attorneys, CPAs and enrolled agents ("tax practitioners") involving practice before the IRS and has the power to impose various penalties. OPR can also take action against tax practitioners for conviction of a crime or failure to file their own tax returns. According to former OPR director Karen Hawkins, "The focus has been on roadkill – the easy cases of tax practitioners who are non-filers." The current acting director is Elizabeth Kastenberg.

=== Criminal Investigation (CI) ===
Internal Revenue Service, Criminal Investigation (IRS-CI) is responsible for investigating potential criminal violations of the U.S. Internal Revenue Code and related financial crimes, such as money laundering, currency violations, tax-related identity theft fraud, and terrorist financing that adversely affect tax administration. This division is headed by the Chief, Criminal Investigation appointed by the IRS Commissioner.

=== Programs ===
Volunteer Income Tax Assistance (VITA) and Tax Counseling for the Elderly (TCE) are programs that the IRS runs to train volunteers and provide tax assistance and counseling to taxpayers. Volunteers can study e-course material, take tests, and practice using tax-preparation software. Link & Learn Taxes (searchable by keyword on the IRS website), is the free e-learning portion of VITA/TCE program for training volunteers.

=== Structure ===
- Commissioner of Internal Revenue
  - Deputy Commissioner for Services and Enforcement
    - Assistant Deputy Commissioner for Services and Enforcement
    - Large Business and International Division – administers tax laws governing businesses with assets greater than $10 million
    - Small Business/Self-Employed Division – administers tax laws governing small businesses and self-employed taxpayers
      - Collection – collects delinquent taxes and secures filing of delinquent tax return
      - Examination – reviews returns to ensure taxpayers have complied with their tax responsibilities
      - Operations Support – centralized support services
    - Taxpayer Services – administers tax laws governing individual wage earners
      - Customer Assistance, Relationships and Education – assist taxpayers in satisfying their tax responsibilities
      - Return Integrity and Compliance Services – detecting and preventing improper refunds
      - Customer Account Services – processing taxpayer returns
      - Operations Support – internal management and support services
    - Tax Exempt and Government Entities Division – administers tax laws governing governmental and tax exempt entities
      - Government Entities/Shares Services – manages, directs, and executes nationwide activities for government entities as well as provides divisional operational support
      - Employee Plans. – administers pension plan tax laws
      - Exempt Organizations – determining tax exempt status for organizations and regulating the same through examination and compliance checks
    - Criminal Investigation Division – investigates criminal violations of tax laws and other related financial crimes
      - International Operations – conducts international investigations of financial crimes and provides special agent attaches in strategic International locations
      - Operations, Policy, and Support – plans, develops, directs, and implements criminal investigations through regional field offices
      - Refund and Cyber Crimes – identifying criminal tax schemes and conducting cybercrime investigations
      - Strategy – internal support services
      - Technology Operations and Investigative Services – management of information technology
    - Office of Online Services
    - Return Preparer Office
    - Office of Professional Responsibility
    - Whistleblower Office
  - Deputy Commissioner for Operations Support
    - Assistant Deputy Commissioner for Operations Support
    - Chief, Facilities Management and Security Services
    - Chief Information Officer
    - Chief Privacy Officer
    - Chief Procurement Officer
    - Chief Financial Officer
    - IRS Human Capital Officer
    - Chief Risk Officer
    - Chief Diversity Officer
    - Chief Research and Analytics Officer
  - Chief of Staff
  - Chief, Communications and Liaison
  - National Taxpayer Advocate
  - Chief Counsel
  - Chief, IRS Independent Office of Appeals

== Tax collection statistics ==
U.S. Treasury Department estimates of unpaid taxes indicate that over half of all unpaid taxes are attributable to the top 5% of earners.

Summary of collections before refunds by type of return, fiscal year 2021:

Type of return	Number of returns	Gross collections to the nearest million US$
Individual Income tax	167,915,264	2,294,051
Employment taxes	33,865,353	1,258,171
Corporate income tax	2,143,717	419,009
Excise taxes	1,276,921	58,290
Gift tax	282,054	4,621
Estate tax	3,241,024	54,004
Total	208,724,333	4,088,146

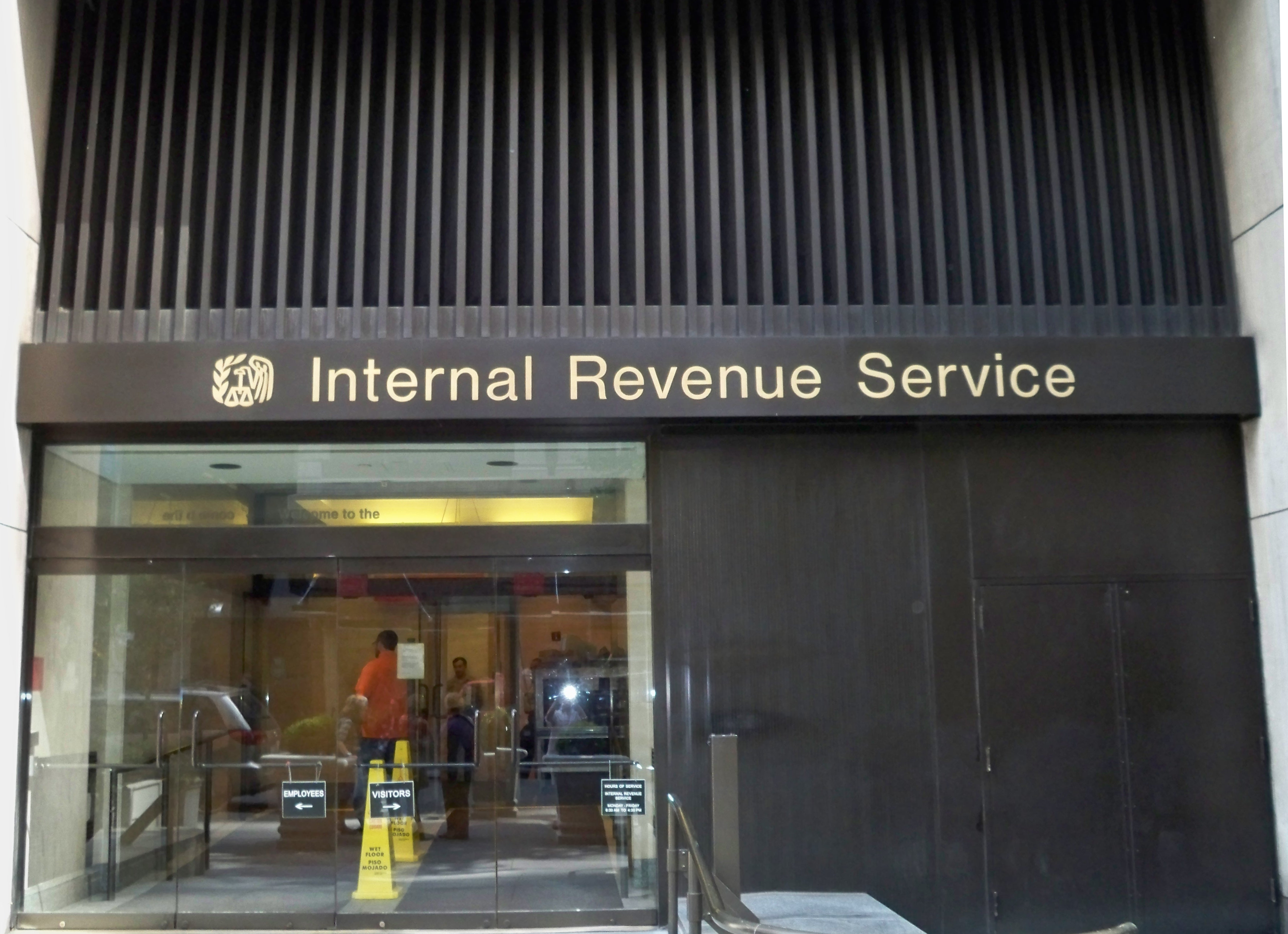
New York City field office for the IRS

For fiscal year 2009, the U.S. Congress appropriated spending of approximately $12.624 billion of "discretionary budget authority" to operate the Department of the Treasury, of which $11.522 billion was allocated to the IRS. The projected estimate of the budget for the IRS for fiscal year 2011 was $12.633 billion. By contrast, during Fiscal Year (FY) 2006, the IRS collected more than $2.2 trillion in tax (net of refunds), about 44 percent of which was attributable to the individual income tax. This is partially due to the nature of the individual income tax category, containing taxes collected from working class, small business, self-employed, and capital gains. The top 5% of income earners pay 38.284% of the federal tax collected.

As of 2007, the agency estimates that the United States Treasury is owed $354 billion more than the amount the IRS collects. This is known as the tax gap.

The gross tax gap is the amount of true tax liability that is not paid voluntarily and timely. For years 2008–2010, the estimated gross tax gap was $458 billion. The net tax gap is the gross tax gap less tax that will be subsequently collected, either paid voluntarily or as the result of IRS administrative and enforcement activities; it is the portion of the gross tax gap that will not be paid. It is estimated that $52 billion of the gross tax gap was eventually collected resulting in a net tax gap of $406 billion.

In 2011, 234 million tax returns were filed allowing the IRS to collect $2.4 trillion out of which $384 billion were attributed to mistake or fraud.

=== Outsourcing collection and tax-assistance ===
In September 2006, the IRS started to outsource the collection of taxpayers debts to private debt collection agencies. Opponents to this change note that the IRS will be handing over personal information to these debt collection agencies, who are being paid between 29% and 39% of the amount collected. Opponents are also worried about the agencies' being paid on percent collected, because it will encourage the collectors to use pressure tactics to collect the maximum amount. IRS spokesman Terry Lemons responds to these critics saying the new system "is a sound, balanced program that respects taxpayers' rights and taxpayer privacy". Other state and local agencies also use private collection agencies.

In March 2009, the IRS announced that it would no longer outsource the collection of taxpayers debts to private debt collection agencies. The IRS decided not to renew contracts to private debt collection agencies and began a hiring program at its call sites and processing centers across the country to bring on more personnel to process collections internally from taxpayers. As of October 2009, the IRS has ceased using private debt collection agencies.

In September 2009, after undercover exposé videos of questionable activities by staff of one of the IRS's volunteer tax-assistance organizations were made public, the IRS removed ACORN from its volunteer tax-assistance program.

== Administrative functions ==
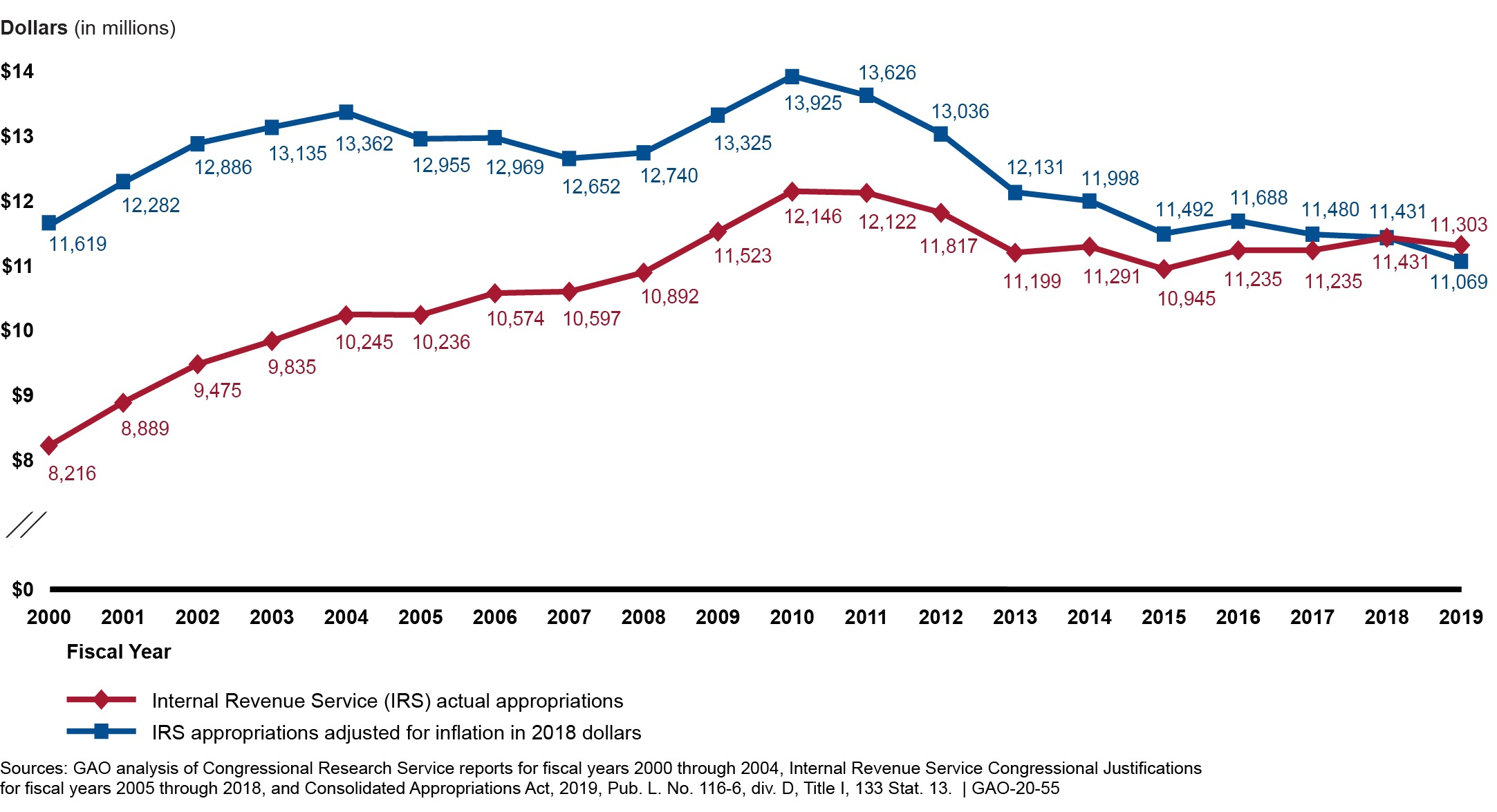
IRS appropriations, 2000–2019 Nominal appropriations Adjusted for inflation

The IRS publishes tax forms which taxpayers are required to choose from and use for calculating and reporting their federal tax obligations. The IRS also publishes a number of forms for its own internal operations, such as Forms 3471 and 4228 (which are used during the initial processing of income tax returns).

In addition to collection of revenue and pursuing tax cheaters, the IRS issues administrative rulings such as revenue rulings and private letter rulings. In addition, the Service publishes the Internal Revenue Bulletin containing the various IRS pronouncements. The controlling authority of regulations and revenue rulings allows taxpayers to rely on them. A letter ruling is good for the taxpayer to whom it is issued and gives some explanation of the Service's position on a particular tax issue. Additionally, a letter ruling reasonably relied upon by a taxpayer allows for the waiver of penalties for underpayment of tax.

As is the case with all administrative pronouncements, taxpayers sometimes litigate the validity of the pronouncements, and courts sometimes determine a particular rule to be invalid where the agency has exceeded its authority. The IRS also issues formal pronouncements called Revenue Procedures. These guide taxpayers through different processes, such as correcting prior tax errors. The IRS's own internal operations manual is the Internal Revenue Manual, which describes the clerical procedures for processing and auditing tax returns for almost any circumstance. For example, the Internal Revenue Manual includes special procedures for processing tax returns from the President and Vice President of the United States.

In addition to the foregoing procedures, the IRS also engages in formal rulemaking in order to provide its own formal interpretation of a statute, or when the statute itself directs that the secretary of the treasury shall provide for such rulemaking. The IRS initiates the formal regulation process by publishing a notice of proposed rulemaking (NPRM) in the Federal Register which announces the proposed regulation, the date of the in-person hearing, and the process for interested parties to have their views heard either in person at the hearing in Washington, D.C., or by mail. Following the statutory period provided in the Administrative Procedure Act the Service decides on the final regulations "as is", or as reflecting changes, or sometimes withdraws the proposed regulations. Generally, taxpayers may rely on proposed regulations until final regulations become effective. For example, human resource professionals are relying on the October 4, 2005, Proposed Regulations (citation 70 F.R. 57930–57984) for the Section 409A on deferred compensation (the so-called Enron rules on deferred compensation to add teeth to the old rules) because regulations have not been finalized.

The IRS oversaw the Homebuyer Credit and First Time Homebuyer Credit programs instituted by the federal government from 2008 to 2010. Those programs provided United States citizens with money toward the purchase of homes, regardless of income tax filings.

== Labor union ==
Most non-supervisory employees at the IRS are represented by a labor union. The exclusive labor union at the IRS is the National Treasury Employees Union (NTEU). Employees are not required to join the union or pay dues. The IRS and NTEU have a national collective bargaining agreement.

In pursuing administrative remedies against the IRS for certain unfair or illegal personnel actions, under federal law an IRS employee may choose only one of the three forums below:

- NTEU, or
- United States Merit Systems Protection Board (MSPB), or
- United States Office of Special Counsel (OSC).

Employees are also required to report certain misconduct to TIGTA. Federal law prohibits reprisal or retaliation against an employee who reports wrongdoing.

== Controversies ==
The IRS has been accused of abusive behavior on multiple occasions. Testimony was given before a Senate subcommittee that focused on cases of overly aggressive IRS collection tactics in considering a need for legislation to give taxpayers greater protection in disputes with the agency.

Congress passed the Taxpayer Bill of Rights III on July 22, 1998, which shifted the burden of proof from the taxpayer to the IRS in certain limited situations. The IRS retains the legal authority to enforce liens and seize assets without obtaining judgment in court.

In 2002, the IRS accused James and Pamela Moran, as well as several others, of conspiracy, filing false tax returns and mail fraud as part of the Anderson Ark investment scheme. The Morans were eventually acquitted, and their attorney stated that the government should have realized that the couple was merely duped by those running the scheme.

In 2004, the law licenses of two former IRS lawyers were suspended after a federal court ruled that they defrauded the courts so the IRS could win a sum in tax shelter cases.

In 2013, the Internal Revenue Service became embroiled in a political scandal in which it was discovered that the agency subjected conservative or conservative-sounding groups filing for tax-exempt status to extra scrutiny, though liberal groups were also targeted.

On September 5, 2014, 16 months after the scandal first erupted, a Senate Subcommittee released a report that confirmed that Internal Revenue Service used inappropriate criteria to target Tea Party groups, but found no evidence of political bias. The chairman of the Senate Permanent Subcommittee on Investigations confirmed that while the actions were "inappropriate, intrusive, and burdensome", the Democrats have often experienced similar treatment. Republicans noted that 83% of the groups being held up by the IRS were right-leaning; and the Subcommittee Minority staff, which did not join the Majority staff report, filed a dissenting report entitled, "IRS Targeting Tea Party Groups".

On May 25, 2015, the agency announced that over several months criminals had accessed the private tax information of more than 100,000 taxpayers and stolen about $50 million in fraudulent returns. By providing Social Security numbers and other information obtained from prior computer crimes, the criminals were able to use the IRS's online "Get Transcript" function to have the IRS provide them with the tax returns and other private information of American tax filers. On August 17, 2015, IRS disclosed that the breach had compromised an additional 220,000 taxpayer records. On February 27, 2016, the IRS disclosed that more than 700,000 Social Security numbers and other sensitive information had been stolen.

The Internal Revenue Service has been the subject of frequent criticism by many elected officials and candidates for political office, including some who have called to abolish the IRS. Among them were Ted Cruz, Rand Paul, Ben Carson, Mike Huckabee, and Richard Lugar. In 1998, a Republican congressman introduced a bill to repeal the Internal Revenue Code by 2002. In 2016, the Republican Study Committee, which counts over two-thirds of House of Representatives Republicans as its members, called for "the complete elimination of the IRS", and Republican representative Rob Woodall of Georgia has introduced a bill every year since he entered Congress in 2011 to eliminate income taxes and abolish the IRS. As of 2016, support for Woodall's bill has grown to 73 co-sponsors.

In 2022, Representative Matt Gaetz of Florida introduced a bill to disarm the IRS after the agency had drawn public attention for a $700,000 purchase of ammunition.

Over 20,000 taxpayers were erroneously marked as deceased in 2022. This prevents taxpayers from filing their taxes or receiving their refunds.

The IRS has been criticized for its reliance on legacy software. Systems such as the Individual Master File are more than 50 years old and have been identified by the Government Accountability Office as "facing significant risks due to their reliance on legacy programming languages, outdated hardware, and a shortage of human resources with critical skills".

Critics have accused the IRS of failing to protect confidential taxpayer information. In one incident, thousands of tax returns were leaked without authorization, due to information security failures. Internal government reports have also indicated that sensitive information stored on microfilms has not been kept secure or properly recorded, creating security risks for taxpayers.

In May 2024, the Senate Finance Committee investigated whether the IRS failed to control a tax break offered by the Puerto Rico government, known as Act 22, to attract the wealthy to Puerto Rico.

== See also ==
- HM Revenue and Customs, the UK equivalent
- Canada Revenue Agency, the Canadian equivalent
- IRS penalties
- Tax evasion in the United States
