= Internal Revenue Service Restructuring and Reform Act of 1998 =

1998 taxation legislation

- Other short titles: Taxpayer Bill of Rights III
- Acronyms (colloquial): RRA 98
- Enacted by: the 105th United States Congress

Citations
- Public law: Pub. L. 105–206 (text) (PDF)
- Statutes at Large: 112 Stat. 685

Codification
- Titles amended: 26 U.S.C., the Internal Revenue Code of 1986

Legislative history
- Introduced in the House of Representatives as H.R. 2676 by Rep. Bill Archer (R-TX) on October 21, 1997; Committee consideration by House Ways and Means Committee; House Oversight and Reform Committee; House Rules Committee; Senate Finance Committee

The Internal Revenue Service Restructuring and Reform Act of 1998, also known as Taxpayer Bill of Rights III (Pub. L. 105–206 (text) (PDF), 112 Stat. 685, enacted July 22, 1998), resulted from hearings held by the United States Congress in 1996 and 1997. The Act included numerous amendments to the Internal Revenue Code of 1986. The bill was passed in the Senate unanimously, and was seen as a major reform of the Internal Revenue Service.

== Provisions ==
=== Individuals ===
The Act provides that individuals who fail to provide their taxpayer identification numbers are not allowed to take the earned income credit for the year in which the failure occurs.

Individuals are allowed to deduct interest expense paid on certain student loans.

The exclusion, from income, of gain on the sale of a principal residence (up to $250,000 for individuals or $500,000 on a joint return) is pro-rated for certain taxpayers.

The use of a continuous levy—a levy attaching to both property held on the date of levy and to property acquired after that date—must be specifically approved by the Internal Revenue Service (IRS) before the levy is effective.

=== Business and investment ===
The Act changed the holding period for long-term capital gain treatment from eighteen months to twelve months, effective for tax years that begin after December 31, 1997.

=== Structure and function of the IRS ===
The Act mandated the replacement of geographic regional divisions of the IRS with units designed to serve particular categories of taxpayers.

The Act also provided a five-year term of office for the Commissioner of Internal Revenue. The Act also provided that the National Taxpayer Advocate will be appointed by the Secretary of the Treasury, and will report directly to the Commissioner of Internal Revenue.

The Act created an IRS Oversight Board to ensure, among other things, that taxpayers are properly treated by IRS employees.

The IRS was barred from using the term "illegal tax protester".

=== Taxpayer rights or behavior of IRS personnel ===
The Act created a limited privilege for taxpayers with respect to certain communications made between a taxpayer and a "federally authorized tax practitioner" in non-criminal proceedings.

The Act allows for civil damages of up to $100,000 where an IRS office or employee negligently disregards the tax statutes or regulations.

The Act limits the use of certain financial status audit techniques by IRS employees.

The Act also provides that unless the Commissioner of Internal Revenue decides otherwise, an IRS employee must be fired if the employee has been found, in a final administrative or judicial proceeding, to have engaged in any of the following kinds of conduct:

(1) willful failure to obtain the required approval signatures on documents authorizing the seizure of a taxpayer's home, personal belongings, or business assets;

(2) providing a false statement under oath about a material matter involving a taxpayer or a taxpayer representative;

(3) with respect to a taxpayer, or a taxpayer representative, or a fellow employee of the Internal Revenue Service, the violation of any right under the U.S. Constitution or any civil right under various specific federal statutes;

(4) falsifying or destroying documents to conceal mistakes made by any employee with respect to a matter involving a taxpayer or a taxpayer representative;

(5) assault or battery on a taxpayer, a taxpayer representative, or other employee of the Internal Revenue Service, but only if there is a criminal conviction, or a final judgment by a court in a civil case, with respect to the assault or battery;

(6) violations of the Internal Revenue Code of 1986, or of Department of Treasury regulations, or of policies of the Internal Revenue Service, to retaliate against or harass a taxpayer, or a taxpayer representative, or a fellow employee of the Internal Revenue Service;

(7) willful misuse the provisions of section 6103 of the Internal Revenue Code (relating to confidentiality of tax returns and tax return information) to conceal information from a congressional inquiry;

(8) willful failure to timely file any tax return required under the Internal Revenue Code, unless the failure is due to reasonable cause and is not due to willful neglect;

(9) willful understatement of a Federal tax liability, unless the understatement is due to reasonable cause and is not due to willful neglect;

(10) threatening to audit a taxpayer to extract personal gain or benefit.

In fiscal year 2008, the IRS substantiated 320 Section 1203 allegations. Of these, 311 were due to employees' failure to file a federal tax return or understatement of their tax liability, and would not have affected taxpayers.

Stephen A. Whitlock implemented the Service's plan for mitigation of penalty under Section 1203 of the Restructuring and Reform Act of 1998 and set up the processes and procedures for the Commissioner's Review Board.

=== Tax collection activities ===
The Act also provided that certain assessments and levies must have the approval of IRS legal counsel.

The Act also provided that the IRS cannot seize a personal residence to satisfy a liability of $5,000 or less.

The Act provides for changes in the due process rights afforded to taxpayers after the filing of a notice of Federal tax lien.

The IRS was also required by the Act to follow certain guidelines in the Fair Debt Collection Practices Act.

The Act also changes certain procedures relating to taxpayers' offers in compromise of tax liabilities and Installment Agreement between taxpayers and the IRS with respect to payment of taxes.

=== Judicial proceedings ===
The Act increased, from $10,000 to $50,000, the designated maximum amount that may be at issue in simplified "small tax case" actions filed in the United States Tax Court.

The Act also changed certain rules regarding the burden of proof in court proceedings in connection with Federal taxes.
