= TaxAudit =

American financial services company

- Company type: Corporation
- Industry: Tax audit representation
- Founded: 1988; 38 years ago
- Headquarters: Folsom, California, United States,
- Key people: Jake J. Sindt (CEO)
- Website: taxaudit.com

TaxAudit is the public brand name of American tax firm TaxResources, Inc., which specializes in tax representation for individuals and small businesses, providing audit defense and tax debt relief services. TaxResources, Inc. was founded in 1988. The firm became the exclusive provider of Intuit Corporation's TurboTax Audit Defense in 1999. TaxAudit is the largest audit defense firm in the United States. They are headquartered in Folsom, California, with additional offices in Southern California.

== Overview ==
TaxAudit is a membership organization that offers prepaid audit defense and representation services when a member receives an income tax audit. They also provide audit defense services for taxpayers who are not members and tax debt relief services.

== TurboTax ==
Since 1999, TaxAudit has been the provider of TurboTax audit defense.
