= California Tax Education Council =

US nonprofit organization

The California Tax Education Council (CTEC) is a private nonprofit quasi-public benefit organization that is mandated by the State of California. CTEC is responsible for providing a list of its approved tax education providers and verifying nonexempt tax preparers have met the state’s minimum requirements to prepare tax returns for a fee.

The responsibility for approving tax schools was transferred from the California Department of Consumer Affairs to CTEC by the California State Legislature and Governor, effective July 1, 1997.

== Summary ==
In 1996, the California State Legislature passed the Tax Preparers Act in an effort to help protect taxpayers against fraudulent and incompetent tax preparers.

The CTEC Board of Directors is composed of unpaid volunteers appointed to the board by certain Qualified Organizations. The board includes several committees that carryout the duties of the council.
