= Customer Account Data Engine =

Customer Account Data Engine 2
- Developers: IRS, IBM, Northrop Grumman, et al.
- Written in: Java, SQL, COBOL
- Operating system: Z/OS
- Platform: IBM mainframe, IBM DB2

Customer Account Data Engine (CADE) is the name of two Internal Revenue Service (IRS) tax processing systems, used for filing United States income tax returns. Work on the original CADE, designed to replace the Individual Master File (IMF) system, was begun in 2000 and stopped in 2009. The original CADE is in active use; for instance, in 2009, it was used to process over 40 million tax returns.

In 2009, work began on CADE 2, with an initial planned implementation date of 2014 for major functionality. However, CADE 2's major functionality is not expected to be used until 2023 (as of 2021) and the full system is not expected to be implemented until 2030.

== Development ==
Development of CADE was first discussed in 2000 in the IRS Modernization Plan, with an original operational date of November 1, 2006. Programming and development began in 2003, but actual processing on the system was delayed until 2005. The system initially processed only 1040EZ tax returns, the simplest type of electronic tax returns. In 2006, the capacity was increased for the system to begin processing a limited number of more complex 1040 forms and other support forms. In 2007, the system began to process Schedule C forms and other more complex tax forms.

Because the system is unable to handle the full load of IRS tax returns, a hybrid approach is used by the IRS, where the majority of tax returns are still processed with the existing, older system (IMF). Current loads and tax returns processed by CADE are used for testing purposes to verify system functionality.

Basic CADE functionality includes:

- Ability to change client addresses manually
- Process Married Filing Jointly & Separately without dependents (Married Once) returns
- Process “Clean” Dependents (Dependents that are clearly legitimate) returns
- Process Head-of-Household without Dependents or with “Clean” Dependents returns
- Process Annual Archiving of tax returns
- Process Limited Name Changes on Tax Returns
- Process 1040 Schedules A, B, and R
- Process 1040A Schedules 1, and 3
- Ability to match tax return data to Social Security Administration (SSA) information for verification.
- Ability to interface with and update Census Bureau statistics
- Process 1040 Schedules C, E & F w/o EIN supporting forms, including Sch. SE
- Process 1040 Schedule D and supporting forms

== Benefits ==
=== Benefits to the public ===
CADE will increase the speed of tax return processing. Under the current system, processing tax returns can take as long as one week and taxpayers have to wait between 14 and 35 days for the IRS to deposit their refund or mail them a check. Using CADE, tax returns will be generally completed within 24 hours and deposits issued within 48–72 hours. Check mailing times have not yet been determined, but there is expected to be at least a one-week wait.

=== Benefits to the IRS ===
The purpose of CADE is to replace the current IRS processing and database system that the IRS has been using since 1969. CADE should provide superior security and advanced processing techniques. CADE will be capable of superior security and fraud protection mechanisms with automated detection of tax return errors and inconsistencies. This will be done in part by interfacing with other government systems to verify information. CADE will also provide superior in-house functionality for the IRS to access information, reports, compliance issues, notices, and revenue accounting. The system also provides superior internal security by logging information accessed by IRS employees.

=== Compatibility ===
CADE is planned to eventually interface with the following IRS and governmental database systems for enhanced tracking and reporting:

- Refund Information File (RFIF)
- Questionable Refund Program/Refund Interest Program/Electronic Tax Administration (QRP/RIP/ETA)
- Duplicate Direct Deposit (DDD)
- Statistics of Income (SOI)
- 701 Exec, Microfilm Replacement System (MRS)
- IMF Weekly Reports
- Return to CPE and IMF
- Taxpayer Address Request (TAR) – Legacy Account Formatted File (LAFF) Summary
- Corporate Files Online (CFOL)
- Interim Revenue Accounting Control System (IRACS) Recap Data
- Interim Revenue Accounting Control System (IRACS) Refund Data
- Financial Management Information Systems (FMIS)
- Reciprocal Accounting Control Record (RACR)
- Individual Master Files (IMF)
- Electronic Certification System (ECS)
- Microfilm Replacement System (MRS)
- Individual Return Transaction File Online (IRTFOL)
- Return Transaction File (RTF)
- Refund Timeliness Program (RTP)
- Enterprise System Management (ESM)
- Taxpayer Account Transcripts
- Send to Current Processing Environment (CPE)
- LARS-format Balance and Control Data
- Balancing Reports
- Security Administration System (SAS) Reports
- Service Center Input Processing Automation System (SCIPAS) Reports
- Accountability Acceptance Vouchers (AAV) Reports
- Obligation Balance Validation Reports
- Weekly Obligation Balance Data
- CADE Initialization to IMF
- IMF Annual Conversion
- CPE for Address Change – this information goes to the following CPE systems:
  - Enhanced Entity Index File (EEIF)
  - Key Index File (KIF)
  - Name Search File (NSF)
  - National Account Profile (NAP)
  - Address Error Report
- CADE R2CPE Reports
- CPE for Discriminant Index Function (DIF) Processing
- Social Security Administration Self Employment Data
- US Census Bureau Economic Data (Census)

== Impact on industry ==
CADE is expected to impact the tax preparation and tax bank product industry in a significant way. By enabling deposits to be made within 72 hours, the new system will render refund anticipation loans obsolete. It is also expected to greatly increase the demand for e-file.

Taxpayers who do not have established bank accounts to receive direct deposit will still have a minimum of one week wait time for checks by mail.

== See also ==
- IRS e-file
- Modernized e-File
