= IRS Direct File =

Tax filing service provided by the United States Government

- Website type: Tax prep
- Available in: English; Spanish
- Founded: 2024 (Discontinued in 2026)
- Area served: 25 states: Alaska, Arizona, California, Connecticut, Florida, Idaho, Illinois, Kansas, Maine, Maryland, Massachusetts, Nevada, New Hampshire, New Jersey, New Mexico, New York, North Carolina, Oregon, Pennsylvania, South Dakota, Tennessee, Texas, Washington state, Wisconsin, Wyoming,
- Owners: Internal Revenue Service (IRS)
- Creators: USDS and 18F
- Services: Tax filing service
- Website: directfile.irs.gov
- Commercial: No

Direct File was a free, online government service that allowed eligible taxpayers to file their federal tax returns directly with the Internal Revenue Service (IRS). Direct File was designed to be guided, multilingual, interview-based, and accessible to taxpayers who have a variety of attitudes, aptitudes, abilities, and access needs.

The service was introduced by the Joe Biden administration for the 2024 tax season. The program was opposed by the Republican Party and by private tax-preparation software firms. The second Donald Trump administration suspended the program in November 2025. During its existence, the service received favorable ratings by users of the service, and was estimated to save each taxpayer who used it an average of $160 in filing fees and time, totaling $11 billion in fees and time costs annually, and helping families attain $12 billion in additional tax credits.

== Background ==
During the 2021 tax filing season, the two most used tax-filing software programs (TurboTax and H&R Block) no longer participated in the Free File Program after the companies deliberately hid the free option from taxpayers. Through the program, commercial tax software companies in the Free File Alliance offer a free filing option to eligible U.S. taxpayers. In early 2022, because the two largest members of the Free File Alliance no longer provided free support to taxpayers through the program, there were renewed calls for the IRS to develop and offer their own free tax-filing option that was simple and easy to use and laid the groundwork for other modernization efforts for taxpayers.

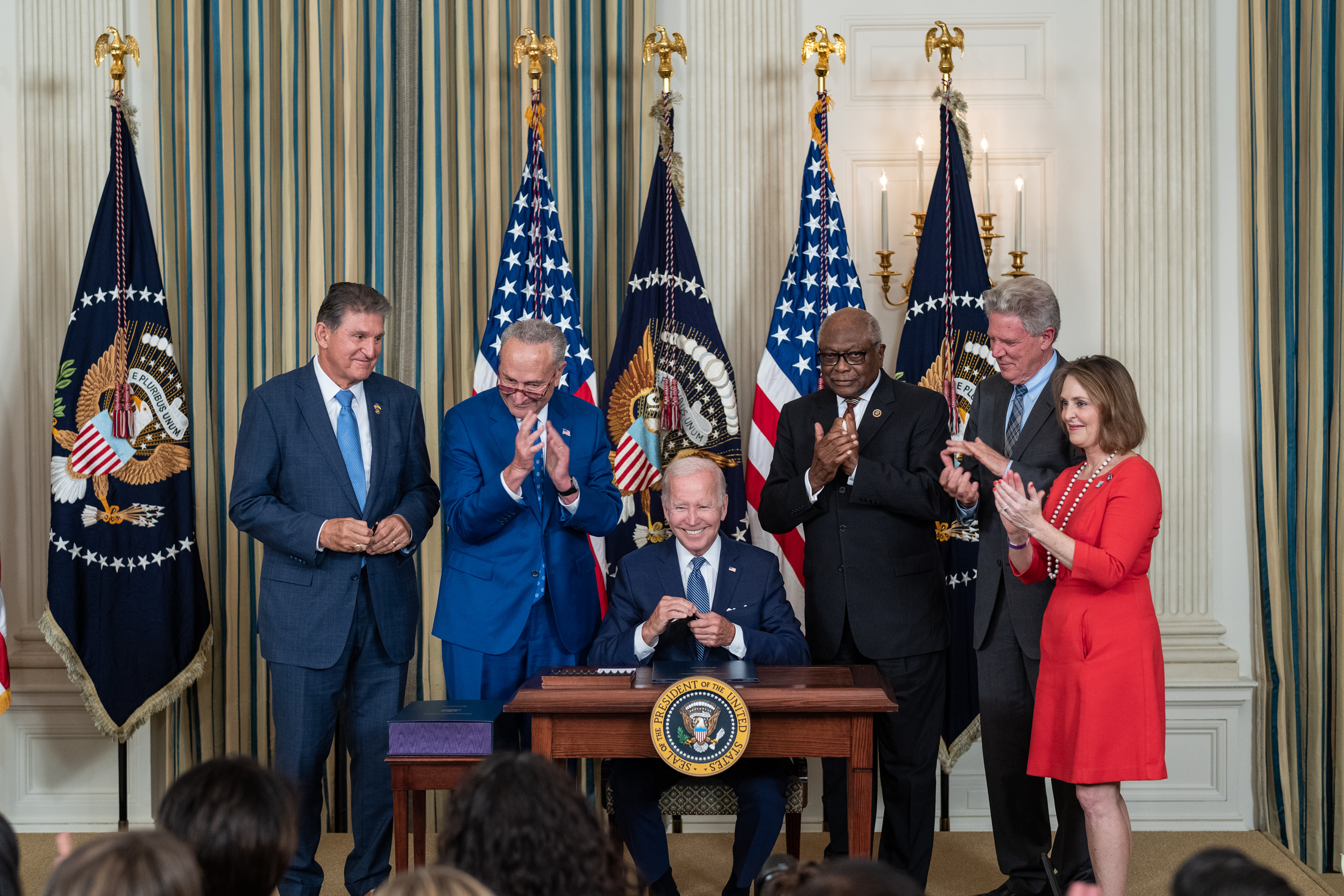
Signing of the Inflation Reduction Act.

In 2022, President Joe Biden signed into law the Inflation Reduction Act, which included funding for the IRS to study and report on costs and feasibility of launching a free, government-run electronic tax filing program. In May 2023, the IRS delivered the report to Congress outlining the feasibility of the potential free filing system. Following the report Secretary of the Treasury Janet Yellen directed IRS Commissioner Danny Werfel and the IRS to develop a limited pilot to further test the concept.

Starting in the tax-filing season 2024, the IRS announced the launch of the Direct File pilot. The initial pilot was developed with support from technology teams within the federal government, U.S. Digital Service and 18F, as well as additional private-sector teams working closely with IRS and Treasury staff.

== Overview ==
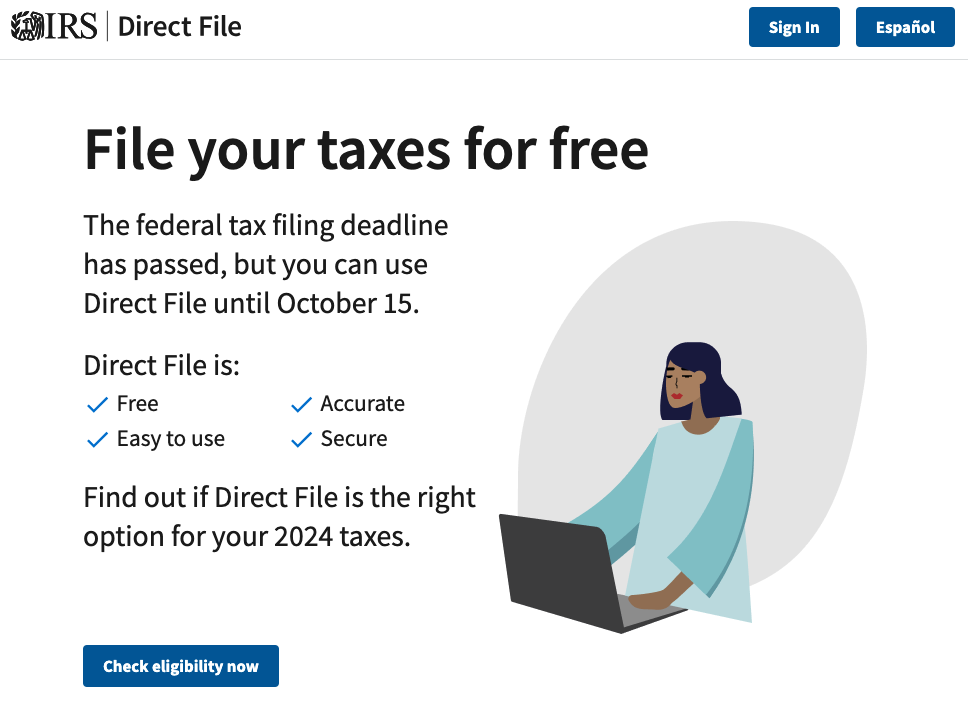
IRS Direct File screenshot

The Direct File pilot program launched in the tax-filing season of 2024, allowing eligible taxpayers from 12 participating states to file their taxes for free. The team under the direction of IRS Commissioner Danny Werfel, launched the 2024 pilot in phases that allowed the team to start small to get it right before scaling to more taxpayers using iterative principles. From an invitation to all states through the Federation of Tax Administrators, states opted into participating in the initial pilot.

Direct File was designed to be guided, multilingual in both English and Spanish, mobile-first, interview-based, and accessible to taxpayers who have a variety of attitudes, aptitudes, abilities, and access needs. Throughout the experience, taxpayers were also given the option to talk with an IRS customer support representative, view the math behind the refund or liability, access other IRS tax resources, and be guided to file their State tax return when applicable. Over the course of the 2024 pilot, more than 3 million taxpayers learned about their eligibility, and approximately 140,803 taxpayers submitted accepted federal tax returns. Taxpayers who used the pilot received over $90 million in refunds, and $35 million in balances due.

Because of the success of the 2024 pilot, IRS and Treasury moved to make the program permanent. In the 2025 tax filing season, Direct File expanded to 25 states and also broadened the number of tax situations it supported to better meet the needs of taxpayers. The additional scope include additional tax credits such as the child and dependent care credit, saver's credit, and the elderly and disabled credit on top of the existing earned-income credit and child tax credit.

== Impact ==
On average, people spend 9 hours and roughly $160 on filing taxes annually, with the burden translating to over an estimated 9 million people who may not be filing and receiving the benefits they may be entitled to each year. Additional research indicated that Direct File saves a taxpayer an average of $160 in filing fees, totaling $11 billion in fees and time costs annually and $12 billion in additional tax credits to families who may not receive them if they do not file.

From post filing surveys, taxpayers rated their experience using Direct File as "excellent" or "above average" and 86% stated it increased their trust in the IRS.

According to Don Moynihan, government scholar, "one of the most tangible federal government innovations of recent years was Direct File, the long-sought effort to allow taxpayers a free and user-friendly means to report their taxes."

== Under the second Trump administration ==
During the Senate confirmation hearing, Treasury Secretary Scott Bessent stated he supported Direct File during the 2025 filing season but did not commit to the long-term future of the program. During the hearing, he stated "I will commit that for this tax season...Direct File will be operative."

In February 2025, Senator Ron Wyden announced that the Department of Government Efficiency (DOGE) was at the IRS; an email was sent to the agency beforehand, asking officers to identify all "non-essential" contracts for termination. Later that month, Elon Musk tweeted "deleted" in reference to a tweet about the Direct File program. IRS saw an immediate drop in usage after the tweet. At the same time, DOGE leaders have discussed creating a similar mobile app that allows people to file their taxes. Wired reported that plans to end direct file followed a meeting between a DOGE member and Free File Inc. (formerly the Free File Alliance).

The 2025 budget reconciliation bill led by Trump and Congressional Republicans mandates the elimination of Direct File. Separately, both of the technical teams that helped develop Direct File with IRS have been eliminated or greatly reduced in capacity by DOGE efforts.

Senator Elizabeth Warren, a supporter of Direct File, stated that the system "gives Americans an easy-to-use, free way to file their taxes — and everybody who uses Direct File loves it. Donald Trump sabotaged the program to give a massive handout to giant tax prep companies instead." A tax expert commented, "ending Direct File is another gift from this administration to large corporations, this time to the multibillion-dollar tax prep industry that profits from you filing your taxes."

In May, 2025, IRS staff released most of the codebase on Github hoping it would allow organizations, states, administrations, and international community build and contribute to the IRS work. Open sourcing the code "is just good government" stated Merici Vinton, one of the leaders of the work.

The One Big Beautiful Bill Act directs the IRS to launch a task force to find a replacement to Direct File using public-private partnerships and provides $15 million to the Treasury Department to research alternatives. Only 3% of eligible taxpayers have used Free File, the existing public-private partnership program. The final version of the Act did not include a provision requiring IRS to eliminate Direct File. In July 2025, IRS Commissioner Bill Long stated the program is gone and "I don't care about Direct File. I care about direct audit."

The Trump administration's cancellation of Direct File is expected to result in higher prices and revenue for financial software company Intuit and tax preparation services company H&R Block, which spent millions lobbying for the end of the program and no longer have to compete with the free tax filing option.

== See also ==
- U.S. Department of Treasury
