= Teaspiller =

- Developer(s): Vemdara, LLC
- Operating system: Web-based
- Type: Accounting software
- License: Proprietary software
- Website: www.teaspiller.com

Teaspiller was a US-based web application for customers to find accountants and hire them to do their taxes and accounting online. In 2013 the company was acquired by Intuit, Inc and added to its TurboTax product line. The Teaspiller employees and code were all acquired and the product was renamed as "TurboTax CPA select".

It enabled accountants to work remotely with clients (share files, send secure messages, schedule appointments), as well as find new clients looking for their specific skills through a complex search algorithm. This was done through extended profiles containing licensing information, professional histories, user ratings, peer endorsements, association memberships, and practice areas.

The service had been called an H&R Block killer by Business Insider as it helped customers find accountants to prepare tax returns online. As of 2011 it had 20,000 US accountants listed on the site. The application was built using the Django framework.

== History ==
Teaspiller was built by Vemdara, LLC, a web company based in New York and founded in 2009 by Amit Vemuri (a former VP at Travelocity). The web application was launched in 2010.

In 2013 the company was acquired by Intuit as part of their TurboTax product line and renamed as "TurboTax CPA select".
