= H&R Block Tax Software =

Set of financial software packages

The H&R Block logo

H&R Block Tax Software, formerly called H&R Block at Home, is a set of software packages for American income tax preparation offered by H&R Block. They are a main competitor of Intuit's TurboTax and Cinven's TaxAct. As of 2014, both the online and software versions of the product go by the flagship name, H&R Block. It was previously called "TaxCut". and from 2008 to 2013 named "H&R Block at Home".

H&R Block offers in-person tax filing and consumer tax software for online tax preparation and electronic filing (e-file) from their website.

There are a variety of software and online products offered by H&R Block, including, H&R Block Online Free, H&R Block Online Deluxe, H&R Block Online Premium, H&R Block Basic Tax Software, H&R Block Deluxe Tax Software, H&R Block Premium Tax Software and H&R Block Premium & Business Tax Software. Either the online or software versions will prepare and file one's federal and state income tax returns with the IRS with the option of electronically filing (e-filing) and direct depositing an applicable tax refund into a specified bank account.
