= Republic Bank & Trust Company =

American Bank

- Type: Public
- Traded as: Nasdaq: RBCAA (Class A); Russell 2000 Component
- Industry: Banking
- Founded: 1982
- Headquarters: Louisville, Kentucky, United States
- Key people: Steven E. Trager (CEO); Bernard M. Trager (founder and chairman)
- Services: Banking
- Number of employees: 1000
- Website: www.republicbank.com

Republic Bank & Trust Company is a Louisville, Kentucky-based bank.

== History ==
In 1977, Republic Bank of Shelby County was formed in Shelbyville, Kentucky by Bernard Trager. Five years later, in 1982, Republic Bank & Trust Company was founded and headquartered in Louisville, Kentucky. In 1983, Republic Bank & Trust Company acquired Republic Savings Bank in Benton, Kentucky. In 1994, all three banks were merged under the Republic Bank & Trust Company name.

Throughout the 1980s and 1990s the bank opened several banking centers throughout communities in Kentucky. In 1987, the bank's operations were moved to a newly constructed office tower in downtown Louisville.

In 1998, Republic Bancorp, Inc. was formed as a holding company for Republic Bank & Trust Company and an initial public offering of 2.14 million shares of Class A common stock was completed. The company also acquired Refunds Now, a national refund anticipation loan and check provider. In the mid-2000s, Refunds Now's name was changed to Tax Refunds Solutions.

In 1999, Republic Bank started Online Banking Operations, as part of the larger trend of expansion of electronic commerce.

In 2001, Republic Bank & Trust Company of Indiana was formed under Republic Bancorp, Inc. This bank was merged back into the Republic Bank & Trust Company in December 2006.

In the mid-2000s, Republic Bank and Trust began to issue its own title insurance policies as part of its own real estate transactions, as part of the verdict of Countrywide Home Loans Inc. v. Kentucky Bar Ass'n., which established that the issuing of title insurance was not the practice of law.

In October 2006, Republic Bancorp acquired Tampa, Florida-based GulfStream Community Bank for $18.1 million.

In January 2012, Republic Bancorp acquired Tennessee Commerce Bank.

In September 2012, Republic Bancorp acquired First Commercial Bank in Bloomington, MN.

In October 2022, it was announced that Republic Bankcorp would acquire C Bank in Cincinnati, Ohio.

== Recognition ==
In recent years Republic has been recognized in the industry for its performance. In 2009, Sandler O'Neil listed Republic as the 10th best performing bank Over $3 billion in assets, and in 2010 ranked 5th overall in the same list. Republic has been ranked #1 out of 155 mid-size banks by Freddie Mac in 2009 for its servicing of mortgage loans.

== Predatory lending ==
Critics charge that Republic uses aggressive marketing techniques to promote high-interest loans, such as payday loans and tax refund anticipation loans to "hard-up borrowers". In a February 17, 2006, letter to the bank, the Federal Deposit Insurance Corporation (FDIC) "cited inherent risks associated with payday lending activities and asked the bank to consider ending this line of business," according to a filing with the U.S. Securities and Exchange Commission. This was prompted by a letter to the FDIC from over 80 national consumer groups complaining about Republic's abusive practices in payday loans.

Half of Republic's income for the first nine months of 2008 was attributed to fees and interest associated with making refund anticipation loans.

== Locations ==
Republic Bank & Trust Company operates banking centers in 5 states: Kentucky, Tennessee, Ohio, Indiana, and Florida.
