= Modernized e-File =

Modernized e-File (MeF) is an electronic system for filing tax returns with the Internal Revenue Service (IRS) of the United States.

The MeF system describes tax forms in terms of XML and supports web-based filing. Modernized e-File was originally introduced in 2004, exclusively for corporate tax returns. Initially, there was only support for Form 1120 and related forms, but each year additional corporate tax forms were supported.

Beginning with tax year 2009, the IRS will extend the Modernized e-File program to cover the 1040 series of forms for income tax returns filed by individuals. The IRS expects to accept the first MeF-based individual income tax filings in 2010. In the initial phase, MeF for individual returns will support form 1040, schedules A, B, C, D, E, EIC, M, R, SE, as well as the additional forms 1099-R, 2106, 2210, 2441, 4562, 4868, 8283, 8812, 8829, 8863, 8880, 8888, and W-2. XML schemas for Form 1040 MeF are available on the IRS web site.

== See also ==
- Customer Account Data Engine
- IRS e-file
- Summary of 2011 Modernized E-File Program
