= Tax rebate discounting =

Practice of purchasing a taxpayer's federal refund in Canada

Tax rebate discounting is a process in Canada where a tax preparation firm (a discounter) acquires a client’s right to a federal refund of tax in exchange for immediate payment that is less than the full expected refund. The practice is regulated by the federal Tax Rebate Discounting Act and its regulations, which are administered by the Canada Revenue Agency (CRA).

== Legal framework ==
Under the Act, the minimum amount a discounter must pay a client at the time of the transaction (the minimum consideration) equals:

- 85% of the refund, if the estimated refund is C$300 or less; or
- C$255 plus 95% of the portion of the refund that exceeds C$300, if the estimated refund is more than C$300.

The Act treats any preparation or filing charge related to the discounting transaction as part of the discount itself. Charging any additional fee beyond the discount is an offence.

The definition of a refund of tax under the Act includes overpayments under the Income Tax Act, as well as overpayments of Employment Insurance premiums and Canada Pension Plan contributions, and any related interest.

== Registration and required forms ==
Firms that discount refunds must be CRA-registered EFILERS and must obtain a CRA discounter code by filing Form RC76.

At the time of the transaction, the discounter must:

- pay the client at least the minimum consideration by cash or a negotiable instrument payable on demand in Canada; and
- provide a Statement of Discounting Transaction in the prescribed form (Form RC71).

After CRA assesses the return, the discounter must promptly send the client a notice of the actual refund amount received (Notice of the Actual Amount of the Refund of Tax), in the prescribed form (Form RC72).

== Process and payment rules ==
CRA may pay the refund directly to the discounter when a right to the refund has been acquired. Any amount the discounter receives that exceeds the estimated refund by C$10 or more is deemed to be held in trust for the client and must be paid to the client, or remitted to the Receiver General if unpaid within 30 days.

Discounters must keep records of each discounting transaction for three years and make them available to CRA or a designated provincial consumer official upon request.

== Offences and penalties ==
It is an offence to pay less than the minimum consideration, to charge extra fees related to the discount, to fail to give required statements or notices, to fail to keep records, or to provide false or misleading information in relation to a discounting transaction. A person who commits an offence under the Act is liable on summary conviction to a fine up to C$25,000. Proceedings must begin within two years after the matter arose.

== GST/HST treatment ==
For GST/HST purposes, a person who provides discounting services that fall under the Act is treated as a listed financial institution, which engages special GST/HST rules.

== Provincial and territorial notes ==
Quebec law prohibits discounting of Quebec provincial income tax refunds. Federal refunds for Quebec residents are still governed by the federal Act. Provincial consumer protection legislation may also apply to contract formation and disclosures.

== See also ==
- Refund anticipation loan (United States)
- EFILE
