= Merici Vinton =

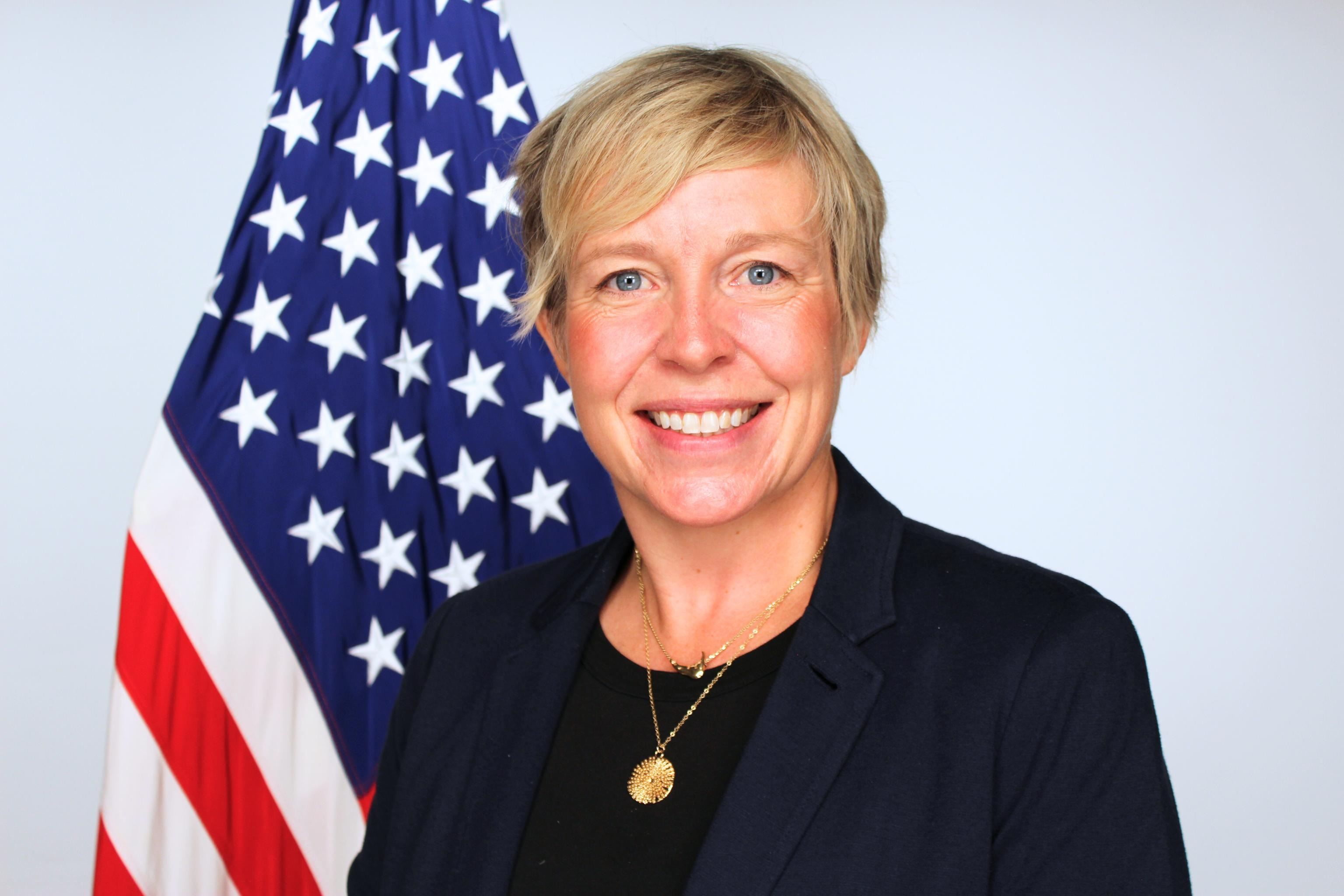
Portrait of Merici Vinton

Merici Vinton is an American civic technologist, government digital services leader, and public policy advocate. She is best known as a chief architect of IRS Direct File, the United States federal government's first free, online tax filing system, which she developed from its inception in 2021 until early 2025. After departing the US Digital Service (USDS) following its takeover by Elon Musk's Department of Government Efficiency (DOGE), Vinton became a prominent public voice on government technology, digital service delivery, and the dismantling of federal digital capacity under the second Trump administration.

== Early life and education ==
Vinton grew up on a ranch approximately thirty miles south of Gordon, Nebraska, in a small rural community. She attended a one-room schoolhouse, which she has said gave her a formative front-row seat to local government in action. When community needs arose, she observed citizens forming committees and engaging in collective problem-solving, an experience she has credited with shaping her civic orientation.

== Career ==
=== Early career in civic technology (2008–2012) ===
Vinton worked on technology and public engagement roles with the 2008 Obama presidential campaign, the Sunlight Foundation, and the organization that became AmeriCorps. These roles laid the groundwork for her 2010 hiring as the first employee of the Consumer Financial Protection Bureau's (CFPB) technology team, where she helped build the agency's consumer complaint database and established an open-source, GitHub-first working philosophy aligned with the CFPB's founding pro-transparency principles.

=== Work in the United Kingdom (2012–2021) ===
Vinton spent approximately nine years based in London, where she continued working on digital government transformation projects. After moving to London, Merici co-founded Ada's List, a global community of women in technology. Another notable achievement during this period was leading the London Borough of Camden's digital transformation of its entire operations effectively overnight during the COVID-19 pandemic. She has described this time as a formative period during which she developed a comparative perspective on how other governments, particularly the UK, approached digital public services.

=== US Digital Service: Child Tax Credit (2021–2022) ===
Upon returning to the United States, Vinton joined the US Digital Service (USDS), a White House technology unit created to improve federal digital services. Her initial assignment was leading USDS's work on the Child Tax Credit expansion, which had been created under the March 2021 American Rescue Plan. The work required helping families across the country access a significant new child benefit and doing so meant they needed to file a tax return. It was during this work that she identified the absence of a free, government-run online tax filing option and became one of the core architects of the effort to build one.

=== IRS Direct File: Architecture, launch, and expansion (2021–2025) ===
Vinton served as deputy service owner of IRS Direct File from its early development through her departure from USDS in early 2025, working alongside product lead Chris Given and designer Jen Thomas. The team grew from seven people at the outset to 75 on the product team alone by launch. The pilot launched in March 2023 for taxpayers in 12 states; in its first year, 86% of users reported that Direct File increased their trust in the IRS. A 2025 filing season report found that 94% of users rated their experience as "excellent" or "above average," up from 90% in the pilot year, with a Net Promoter Score of +80.

In its second filing season (2025), the program expanded to 25 states and approximately 296,531 taxpayers successfully submitted returns using the tool. The Economic Security Project projected the program would eventually generate $11 billion in annual net savings for taxpayers.

=== DOGE takeover and departure from USDS (2025) ===
On Inauguration Day, January 20, 2025, an executive order converted USDS into the US DOGE Service under Elon Musk's direction, catching staff entirely by surprise. On the evening of February 14, roughly a quarter of the staff were dismissed and immediately cut off from all systems prompting Vinton to depart voluntarily.

=== Advocacy and public commentary (2025–present) ===
Following her departure from USDS, Vinton became a prominent public commentator on government technology including sharing lessons on Direct File. In April 2025, after the Associated Press reported the Trump administration planned to discontinue the program, she published "Goodbye IRS Direct File, Hello Inefficiency" in the Federation of American Scientists, arguing the cancellation was contrary to genuine government efficiency. She gave interviews to Channel 4 News (March 2025), CNN (April 2025), MeidasTouch Network, and The Majority Report, among others.

In May 2025, Vinton joined the Economic Security Project's Future of Tax Filing Fellowship alongside former Direct File colleagues Chris Given and Jen Thomas, and former Code for America program director Gabriel Zucker. She also convened a coalition of 40 leaders from government, civic technology, and advocacy in Washington, D.C., to chart the future of public-interest tax filing. The fellowship focused on documenting Direct File's decisions for future administrations, supporting states in building free filing tools using its open-source codebase, and developing tools to help taxpayers identify unclaimed credits. In June 2025, the IRS released most of the Direct File source code on GitHub in accordance with the SHARE IT Act.

Vinton argues that governments should apply the same user-focused, technology-driven approach used to build IRS Direct File across entire agencies, not just individual products. She has argued that the civic technology sector's pattern of building excellent adjacent services without addressing underlying institutional problems is no longer sufficient, given that only 22% of Americans trust the federal government to do what is right.
