= TurboTax =

US tax preparation software

- Developer: Intuit, Inc.
- Release: 1984; 42 years ago
- Operating system: Windows, Macintosh, Android, iOS
- Type: Tax software
- License: Proprietary
- Website: turbotax.intuit.com

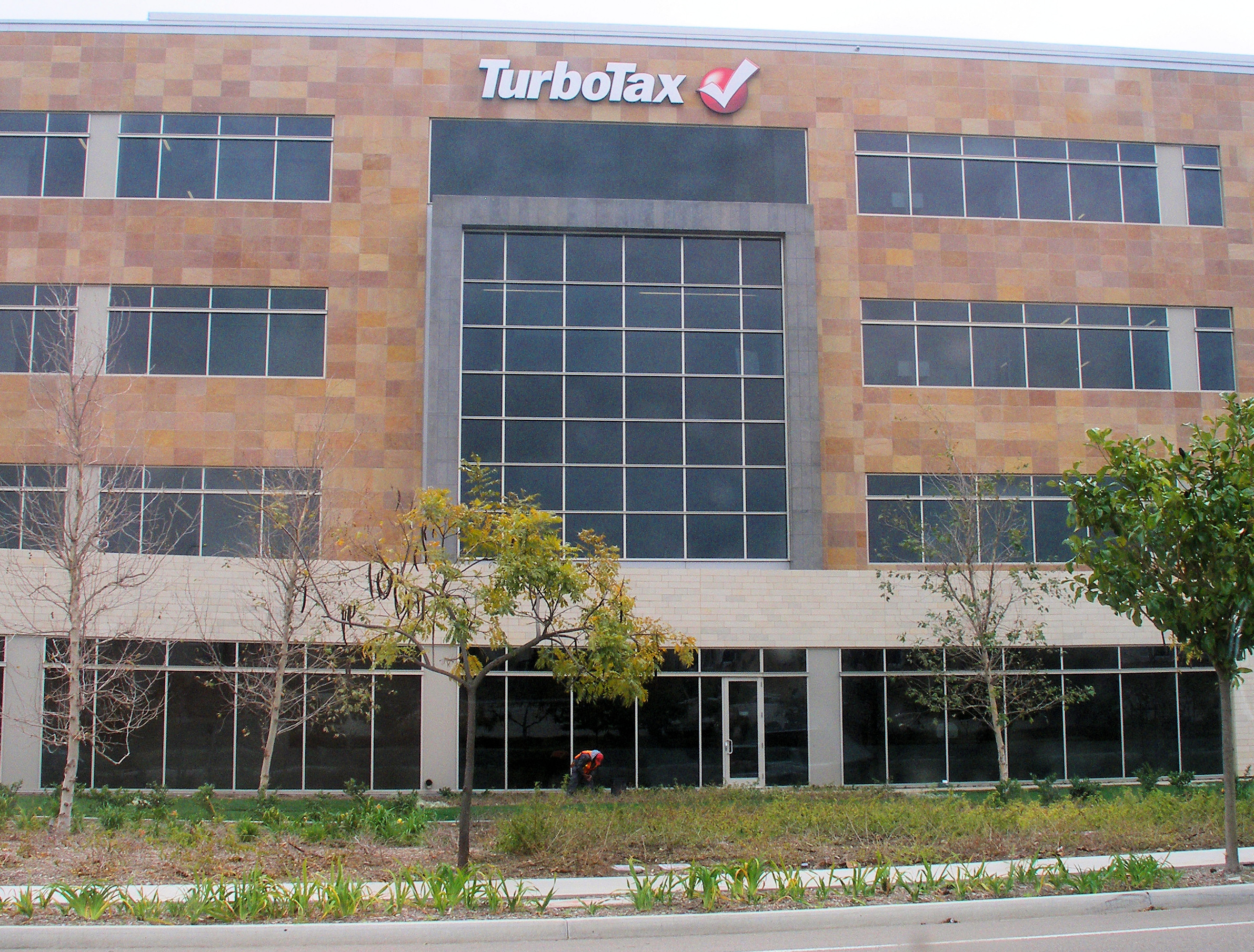
Intuit Consumer Tax Group headquarters in San Diego (where TurboTax is developed)

TurboTax is a software package for preparation of American and Canadian income tax returns, produced by Intuit. TurboTax is a market leader in its product segment, competing with H&R Block Tax Software and TaxAct. TurboTax was developed by Michael A. Chipman of Chipsoft in 1984 and was sold to Intuit in 1993.

The company has been subject of controversy over its political influence and deceptive business practices. Intuit, the maker of TurboTax, has engaged in a multi-million-dollar lobbying campaign against the Internal Revenue Service (IRS) creating its own online system of tax filing like those that exist in most other wealthy countries. Intuit is under investigation by multiple state attorneys general, as well as New York State Department of Financial Services.

As part of an agreement with the IRS Free File program, TurboTax allowed individuals making less than $39,000 a year to use a free version of TurboTax; a 2019 ProPublica investigation revealed that TurboTax deliberately made this version hard to find, even through search engines, and that it deceptively steered individuals who search for the free version to TurboTax versions that cost money to use. TurboTax has tricked military service members into paying to use the filing software by creating and promoting a "military discount" and by making the free version hard to find when many service members are in fact eligible to use the software for free.

== Overview ==
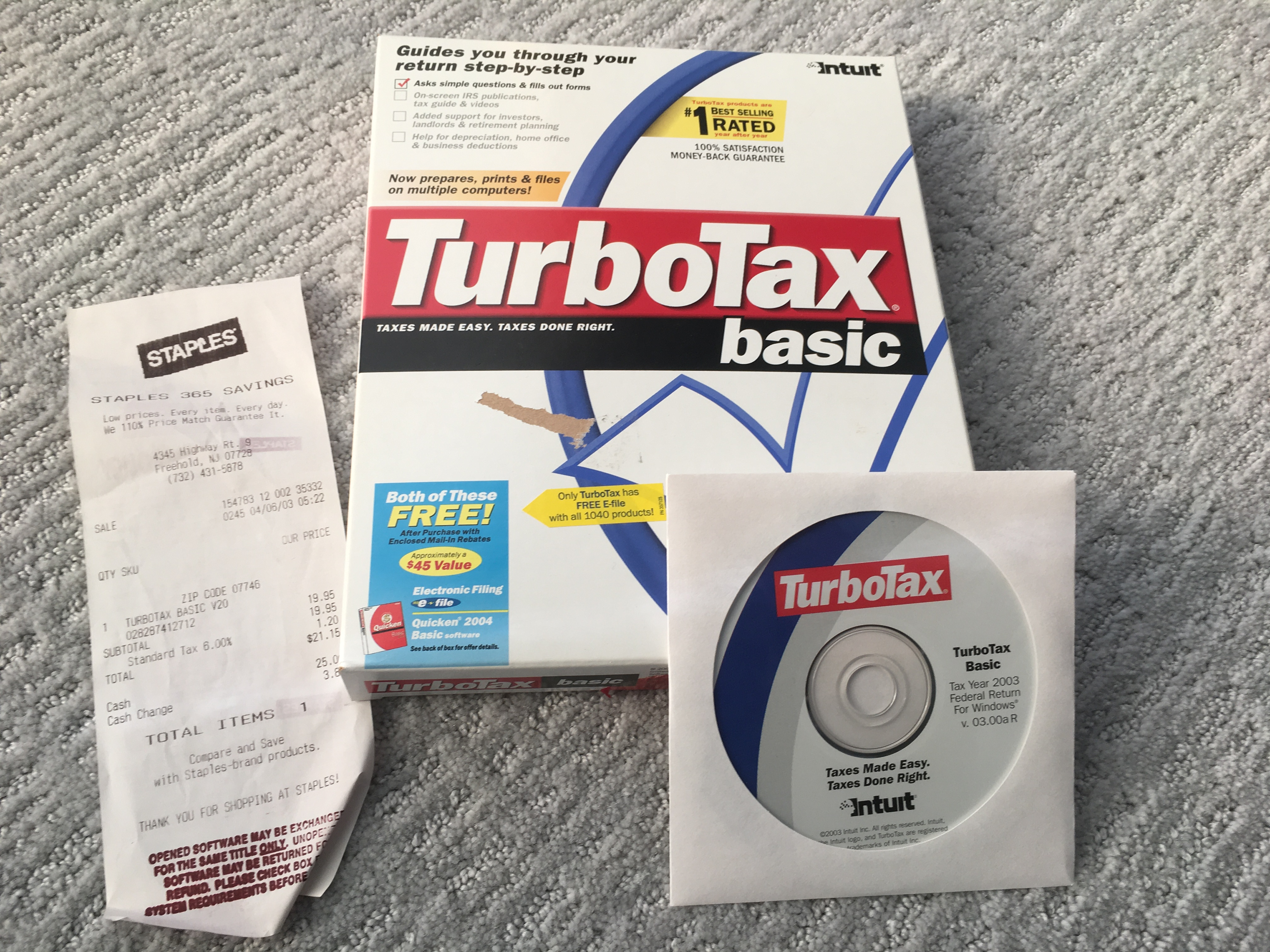
Packaging for TurboTax Basic 2003

Intuit Consumer Tax Group is based in San Diego, California. Intuit Corporation, which owns Intuit, is headquartered in Mountain View, California.

There are a number of different versions, including TurboTax Deluxe, TurboTax Premier, etc. TurboTax is available for both federal and state income tax returns. The software is designed to guide users through their tax returns step-by-step. The TurboTax software provides taxpayers additional support for their self-prepared returns by offering Audit Defense from TaxResources, Inc.

Typically, TurboTax federal software is released late in the year and the state software is released in mid-January to mid-February. TurboTax normally releases its new versions as soon as the IRS completes revisions to the forms and approves the TurboTax versions, usually late in the tax year. The process is similar for states that collect income taxes.

In 2001, TurboTax saved financial institution passwords entered by users to servers at Intuit and the home computer. The programming error was reportedly fixed, but as of 2012 TurboTax offers no option to download a data file directly from the financial institution. Instead, it prompts the user for their login name and password at the financial institution or permits the data to be entered by hand.

In 2003, Intuit faced vocal criticism for its TurboTax activation scheme. The company responded by removing the product activation scheme from its product. In 2005 TurboTax extended its offering by allowing any taxpayer to use a basic version of its federal product free as part of the Free File Alliance. By 2006 that offer has been limited to free federal online tax preparation and e-file for taxpayers whose adjusted gross income is $28,500 or less (or $52,000 for those in the military) and those 50 or under. TurboTax has received a number of complaints regarding its advertising of the free version. For filers who use this basic version of the software, federal filing is free. However, state tax filing is not free, and the cost of using TurboTax to file state returns is not presented to the user until they've already completed entering their information for federal returns.

In 2008, Intuit raised the price of TurboTax for desktop customers by $15 and included a free e-filing for the first return prepared. The company's new "Pay Per Return" policy was criticized for adding a $9.95 fee to print or e-file each additional return after the first, including returns prepared for members of the same household. On December 12, 2008, the company announced that it had rescinded the new policy.

On January 21, 2009, TurboTax received considerable public attention at the Senate confirmation hearing of Timothy F. Geithner to be the United States Secretary of Treasury. Geithner had testified that he used TurboTax to prepare his tax returns for the years 2001 to 2004 but had incorrectly handled the self-employment taxes due as a result of his being employed by the International Monetary Fund. Geithner made it clear that he took responsibility for the error, which was discovered in a subsequent IRS audit, and did not blame TurboTax. Geithner paid $42,702 in back taxes. Intuit responded by releasing a statement saying: "TurboTax, and all software and in-person tax preparation services, base their calculations on the information users provide when completing their returns."

On July 15, 2021, Intuit announced its withdrawal from the Free File Alliance, effective after the tax season concluding in October 2021, stating that "due to the limitations of the Free File program and conflicting demands from those outside the program, we are not able to continue in the program".

== Canada ==
Intuit also offers a separate product for Canadian tax returns, which is also branded as TurboTax, but was previously known as QuickTax. The French-language version of the software retained its original name, ImpôtRapide, until it was rebranded as TurboImpôt in 2017.

== Popularity ==
A 1990 American Institute of Certified Public Accountants member survey found that 10% of respondents used TurboTax to prepare returns, in second place behind Lacerte (16%) and ahead of 1040 Solutions (8%).

== Criticism ==
=== Blocking search engines from indexing its "free file program" page ===
US citizens making up to $72,000 per year are eligible for free preparation and filing of tax forms through the IRS Free File program. However, TurboTax's "free file program" page (https://turbotax.intuit.com/taxfreedom/) contains specific HTML tags (noindex, nofollow) which block search engines from indexing it. TurboTax has been deceiving customers which were eligible for the free submission into signing up for their commercial product. Starting December 30, 2019, under a new agreement from the IRS, TurboTax can no longer hide their free version services from search results.

=== Writing to the boot track ===
The 2003 version of the TurboTax software contained digital rights management that tracked whether it had previously been installed on a computer by writing to sector 33 on the hard drive. This allowed it to track if it was on a computer previously, even through reinstalling the operating system. This also caused it to conflict with some boot loaders that store data there, rendering those computers unbootable.

=== Opposition to return-free filing ===
Intuit, the owner of TurboTax, spent more than $11 million on federal lobbying between 2008 and 2012. Intuit "opposes IRS government tax preparation", particularly allowing taxpayers to file pre-filled returns free, in a system similar to the established ReadyReturn service in California. The company also lobbied on bills in 2007 and 2011 that would have barred the Treasury Department, which includes the IRS, from initiating return-free filing. An Intuit spokeswoman said in early 2013 that "Like many other companies, Intuit actively participates in the political process." She said that return-free filing had "implications for accuracy and fairness in taxation." This led journalist Dylan Matthews to propose a boycott of the company in 2017.

In its 2012 Form 10-K, Intuit said that "We anticipate that governmental encroachment at both the federal and state levels may present a continued competitive threat to our business for the foreseeable future."

=== Repositioning of versions ===
In January 2015 it became known that the Deluxe version no longer supports IRS Schedules C, D, E, and F in interview mode. Although the Deluxe version still allows entry into those schedules by means of "form mode", doing so may result in the loss of the ability to file electronically. In addition, the Premium version no longer supports Schedule C or F in interview mode. Intuit was widely criticized for these changes and responded with short-term mitigation, although it has not reversed the decision. On February 5, 2015, Intuit sent a second email apology to current and former customers regarding the decision to remove specific schedules from the Deluxe and Premium versions. Intuit also apologized for their poorly received initial apology sent on January 27. In the February 5 message Intuit announced that they would reverse course in their 2015 Deluxe and Premium versions, including the schedules that were historically included in the software.

=== Fraudulent return claims ===
In an article by Brian Krebs on February 15, 2015, it was reported that Intuit Inc. temporarily suspended the transmission of state e-filed tax returns due to a surge in complaints from consumers about refunds already claimed in their name.

In a later article on February 22, 2015, Krebs reported that it was alleged by two former employees that Intuit knowingly allowed fraudulent returns to be processed on a massive scale as part of a revenue boosting scheme. Both employees, former security team members for the company, stated that the company had ignored repeated warnings and suggestions on how to prevent fraud. One of the employees was reported to have filed a whistleblower complaint with the US Securities and Exchange Commission.

=== Diverting stimulus funds away from customers ===
In 2021, some individuals who used TurboTax for their tax filings were unable to access stimulus checks sent by the government because TurboTax diverted the checks to old and unused bank accounts for the customers.

=== Deceptive advertising of its "free" tax filing products ===
On March 29, 2022, the Federal Trade Commission announced that they would take legal action against Intuit, the parent company of TurboTax in response to deceptive advertising of its free tax filing products. The commission reported that the majority of tax filers cannot use any of TurboTax's free products which were advertised, claiming that it has misled customers to believing that tax filers can use TurboTax to file their taxes. In addition, tax filers who earn farm income or are gig workers cannot be eligible for those products. Intuit announced that they would take counter action, announcing that the FTC's arguments are "not credible" and claimed that their free tax filing service is available to all tax filers.

On May 4, 2022, Intuit agreed to pay a $141 million settlement over the misleading advertisements. In May 2023, the company began sending over 4 million customers their settlement checks, which ranged from US$30 to $85. In January 2024, the FTC ordered Intuit to fix its misleading ads for "free" tax preparation software - for which most filers wouldn't even qualify.

As of March 2024, Intuit has stopped providing its free TurboTax service.

=== Ontario Child Tax Care Credit miscalculation ===
In 2025, Global News reported that TurboTax claimed financial credits for customers in Ontario that they were not eligible for. The Ontario Child Tax Care Credit, started during the COVID-19 pandemic, allows eligible families to claim up to 75% of their eligible child care expenses. Though only households earning less than CA$150,000 were eligible, TurboTax allegedly "defaulted to calculating child care expense credits based solely on the income of the lower-earning spouse" on joint tax returns. This led to the Canada Revenue Agency demanding penalties and interest in the tens of thousands of dollars from several TurboTax customers. TurboTax argued that the software's calculations were accurate and blamed users for the error.
