= IRS Volunteer Income Tax Assistance Program =

Grant program initiative

- Abbreviation: VITA
- Services: Tax preparation assistance
- Parent organization: Internal Revenue Service
- Website: IRS VITA site

The Volunteer Income Tax Assistance (VITA) grant program is an Internal Revenue Service (IRS) initiative in the United States that supports free tax preparation services for the underserved through various partner organizations.

VITA service helps low- to moderate-income individuals, persons with disabilities, the elderly, and limited English speakers file their taxes each year. IRS awards matching funds to partner organizations throughout the country. The IRS awarded $18 million in grants for FY2019.

== Description ==
VITA was founded in 1971 by Gary Iskowitz at California State University, Northridge.

Since the 1970s, the program has grown to several thousand sites nationwide, partnering with non-profit organizations, local municipalities, and colleges and universities. In Tax Year 2015, 3.7 million VITA tax returns were filed with a 94% accuracy rate. VITA provides services to taxpayers making $67,000 or less per year.

== Volunteers ==
VITA volunteers include greeters, intake specialists, and tax preparers. All volunteers must pass a code of conduct exam and an intake interview/quality review exam.

The VITA tax returns are prepared by IRS tax law-certified volunteers. The volunteers are taught how to use tax software and specific tax law each year. They must pass a tax law exam to receive basic or advanced certification. The passing score is 80%. Certificates expire at the end of the tax year and must be renewed.

VITA has other optional certifications. These include certificates for Military personnel, International tax issues, Foreign Student returns, and Puerto Rico returns. Some military bases participate in VITA with IRS agents, training service members to complete military tax returns. Foreign students' returns are prepared at major public universities such as Arizona State University by more advanced experts.

The complication of applying tax codes and the risk of being taken advantage of by paid tax preparation services is diminished with the presence of over 4,000 nationwide VITA sites. One of the focal points of VITA is raising taxpayer awareness and receipt of the Earned Income Tax Credit (EITC) and Child Tax Credit (CTC). These two credits have a long history of poverty alleviation within the US, they originated during the 1970s War on Poverty in the Tax Reduction Act of 1975.

As of 2017, the Tax Cuts and Jobs Act contributed to the over complication of tax filing. The statistics researched by the non-profit Prosperity Now proves VITA to be a relevant necessity in poverty reduction. Today, tax preparation remains a highly unregulated industry and around 60% of all taxpayers turn to a paid preparation service. The longevity of the VITA program is dependent on funding being approved and provided by Congress. The last official act to support the IRS initiative was made in 2017. The Volunteer Income Tax Assistance Permanence Act of 2017 ensured that low-income workers and under-served communities would gain assistance from VITA. Specifically, the bill “directs the Internal Revenue Service (IRS) to establish a Community Volunteer Income Tax Assistance Matching Grant Program to provide matching funds for the development, expansion, or continuation of tax preparation programs to assist low-income taxpayers and members of under-served populations.”

== Tax law certification levels ==
Certifications	Parts of Tax Law Covered *Not All Inclusive*
Basic	Filing and dependency status; Basic income, such as salaries & wages, interest, and dividends; Disability Income; The Earned Income Credit; Education Credits; Disability Income
Advanced	Self-Employment Income; Calculating the taxable amount of retirement distributions; Sales of Stock, Bonds, or Real Estate and other Capital Transactions; Tip Income; Cancellation of Debt *Previously was its own certification; Marketplace Insurance, ("Obamacare")
Puerto Rico I/II	Income and deductions relating to Puerto Rican residents, and mainland US Residents with Puerto Rico sourced income
International	U.S. Citizens living abroad or with non-U.S. sourced income
Foreign Student	Non-citizen students and scholars living in the United States on; non-immigrant student visas.
Military	Rental of home due to deployment or other ordered absence; Military Moving Expenses

== VITA services ==
There are also a number of tax topics that are "out-of-scope" for the program regardless of a tax preparer's certification. Even professionally licensed volunteers are prohibited from providing advice to taxpayers on out-of-scope topics in the capacity of a volunteer.

Can Prepare	Cannot Prepare
Forms 1040 (including 1040-EZ and 1040-A) – Federal Tax Return; Schedule A – Itemized Deductions; Schedule B – Interest and Dividends; Schedule C/C-EZ – Business Expenses; Simple Schedule D – Capital Gains and Losses; Simple Schedule E for Royalties or income reported on Schedule K-1; Schedule EIC – Earned Income Credit; Schedule SE – Self Employment Tax; Form 2441 – Child Care Expenses; Form 8863 – Education Credits; Form 1040NR; Most State Tax Forms; Returns with K-1 Income, fiduciary pass-through's only; Form 8889 & HSA's; Schedule R	Schedule C – Business Expenses with: A net loss exceeding $10,000; Deductions for depreciation; Deductions for business use of the home; Complex Schedule D – Capital Gains and Losses; Schedule E – Rental Income, except for military rental income; Dual Status Tax Returns (When a noncitizen filer is a nonresident and resident in the same tax year); Income from pass-through entities including: S-Corporations ("Sub-S's"); Partnerships; Form 1120, 1041, or 1065; Schedule F - Farm Income; Responses to IRS Notices for issues other than an amended return; Tax Returns for taxpayers who have declared bankruptcy or intend to; Married Filing Separately may be treated as out of scope.; Tax For Certain Children with Unearned Income, or "Kiddie Tax" returns
