= IRS e-file =

System for submitting tax documents

E-file is a system for submitting tax documents to the Internal Revenue Service (IRS) electronically, typically via the Internet or a direct connection, without the need for paper submissions. E-filing is available to both individual taxpayers and tax professionals. Tax preparation software with e-filing functionality includes standalone desktop applications and web-based platforms. Tax professionals commonly use commercial tax preparation software provided by major vendors to file returns on behalf of clients. Of the 139.3 million US returns filed in 2007, 79.98 million (or about 57.4 percent) were filed electronically. In 2010, a total of 129.3 million US returns were filed, and 93.4 million were filed electronically: in three years the percentage of returns filed electronically increased to 72.3 percent of total returns. In 2018, 89% of tax returns were filed electronically.

Taxpayers can e-file free using the IRS Free File service, either using an authorized IRS e-file provider's tax software, if eligible, or by using online Free File Fillable Forms from the Free File Alliance. Prior to 2020, the use of a third party was required for IRS e-file, and it was not possible to e-file directly through the IRS website.

In 2020, the IRS made direct e-filing possible through IRS Free File Fillable Forms available to taxpayers of any income level. The Republican Party and commercial tax preparation companies have criticized this free electronic tax filing system and sought to end it.

== History ==
The IRS started electronic filing in 1986 to lower operating costs and paper usage. Since then, additional features have been added. In 1987 Electronic Direct Deposit was added as a form of payment. Milestones have been set and broken throughout the years. In 1990 4.2 million returns were reached and in recent years a record of 1 billion 1040's have been E-filed. E-filing originally used the processing system developed in 1969 by the IRS but, since 2003, the IRS has been developing a new enhanced processing system called CADE.

For tax-filing season 2024, the IRS announced a pilot of Direct File, where people can calculate and submit their federal taxes and some state taxes in partnership with select state tax agencies for free. This initiative came as a result of the 2022 Inflation Reduction Act, signed into law by President Joe Biden.

== Types of e-file providers ==
The IRS accepts electronic submission of a variety of tax forms through their IRS Authorized e-file Providers. The IRS offers e-filing to most forms ranging from 1040's to 2290's to 990's.

=== Individual returns ===
Individuals have the option of both free and paid tax software. Recently a feature from the IRS called Free File allows users to file their individual tax returns for free. It is also possible to go through an authorized e-file company that files Form 1040 with a service charge. Free File is free, it's an easy step by step system for those who make less than $64,000 annually and a more detailed form of filing for those who make above $64,000. For those who make more than $64,000 a year, the Free File is not step-by-step but an actual Form 1040 that can be completed electronically.

=== Business returns ===
Businesses and self-employed taxpayers can choose from a variety of commercial e-file services depending on their individual needs. Some of the forms that fall under business returns include Form 2290 (truck tax), Form 1099 (reporting payments to individuals other than employees). IRS has no set pricing for each form, so each filing company sets their own price accordingly. IRS has a list of authorized websites that do e-filing for some forms.

=== Tax exempt organization returns ===
Tax exempt organizations may file the annual information return IRS Form 990, Form 990-EZ and Form 990-N with a variety of independent tax software providers. As with the business returns, the IRS does not set prices; each e-filing company sets their own.

== Authorized filers ==
IRS e-file providers must be authorized by the IRS. The IRS provides a list of authorized e-file providers on some forms. The authorized providers must pass the testing every year. The IRS changes the order of the certified providers list daily for fairness.

== See also ==
- Electronic Tax Administration Advisory Committee
- Electronic tax records
- Free File Alliance
- Refund anticipation loan
- Modernized e-File
