= Electronic Tax Administration Advisory Committee =

Panel of the U.S. Department of the Treasury

The Electronic Tax Administration Advisory Committee (ETAAC) is a panel of the United States Department of the Treasury authorized under the Federal Advisory Committee Act. ETAAC panel members serve as volunteers that are appointed by the Secretary of Treasury and serve a three-year term. ETAAC's primary purpose is to provide continued input into the development and implementation of the Internal Revenue Service’s strategy for electronic tax administration. ETAAC researches, analyzes, considers and makes recommendations on a wide range of electronic tax administration issues. Each June, ETAAC presents an annual report to the United States Congress on the IRS’s progress with electronic tax administration. ETAAC also provides an organized public forum for the discussion of electronic tax administration issues in support of the overriding goal that electronic filing should be the preferred and most convenient method of filing tax and information returns to the IRS.

== Mission and composition ==
ETAAC helps convey to the IRS the public’s perception of the IRS's electronic tax administrative activities, offers constructive observations about current or proposed policies, programs and procedures, and suggests improvements. The ETAAC researches, analyzes, considers, and makes recommendations on a wide range of electronic tax administrative issues and provides input into the development of a strategic plan for electronic tax administration. ETAAC discussions focus on solutions to problems, as well as, constructive observations of electronic tax administrative issues. ETAAC's public forums provide an opportunity for industry and academic leaders to offer collective advice on electronic tax administration issues facing the IRS.

== Members ==
Name	Location	Biography	Term of Office			
Timur Taluy (chair)		CEO and co-owner of FileYourTaxes.com	10/1/2023–10/1/2024			
Vernon Barnett (co-chair)		Commissioner of the Alabama Department of Revenue	10/1/2023–10/1/2024			
Ronald Gilson	Springville, UT	co-owner of Krkcr Inc.	10/1/2023–10/1/2026			
Robert Grennes	Indianapolis, IN	Commissioner of the Indiana Department of Revenue (DOR)	10/1/2023–10/1/2026			
Douglas Harding	Ellington, CT	Tax Corrections Principal examiner at the Connecticut Department of Revenue Services	10/1/2023–10/1/2026			
Andrew Jennison	Vienna, VA	Director, Government Relations, at CGI Technologies and Solutions	10/1/2023–10/1/2026			
Carol Lew	Laguna Hills, CA	Shareholder with Stradling, Yocca, Carlson and Rauth in Newport Beach, California	10/1/2023–10/1/2026			
Amy Wang Miller	Washington, DC	Director, Public Policy at Carta Inc.	10/1/2023–10/1/2026			
Stephanie Plaza	Easton, PA	Senior Lead Product Manager at Wolters Kluwer	10/1/2023–10/1/2026			
Mark Steber	Sarasota, FL	Chief Tax Officer with Jackson Hewitt Tax Service	10/1/2023–10/1/2026	Jonathan Lunardini	State of California FTB	10/1/2021 - 10/2/2024

== Past members ==
Name	Location	Biography	Term of Office
Jim Buttonow (Chair)	Greensboro, NC	Director of Tax Practice and Procedure Services - H&R Block	10/1/2013–10/1/2016
Troy Thibodeau (Vice Chair)	Minneapolis, MN	Executive Vice President - Convey Compliance Systems, Inc.	10/1/2013–10/1/2016
Shaun Barry	Rockville Centre, NY	Principal Fraud & Security Intelligence - SAS Institute	10/1/2012–10/1/2015
Mark Castro	Woodinville, WA	Government Liaison, General Manager - Petz Enterprises	10/1/2012–10/1/2015
Everard Lee Davenport	Washington, DC	Principal - Davenport Consulting	10/1/2013–10/1/2016
Steve Lewis	Sarasota, FL	Vice President, Online and Mobile Applications - Jackson-Hewitt	10/1/2012–10/1/2015
Kevin Richards	Springfield, IL	Director of Tax Forms Management - H&R Block	10/1/2014–10/1/2017
Stephanie Salavejus	Newport News, VA	Vice President & Chief Operations Officer - Peninsula Software	10/1/2014–10/1/2017
Kelli Wooten	Boston, MA	Director - Markit CTI Tax Solutions PRO-TAX and Of Counsel - Burt, Staples & Manner LLP	10/1/2014–10/1/2017

== See also ==
- IRS e-file
- Electronic tax records
