= TaxSlayer =

Privately held tax preparation and tax software company based in Augusta, Georgia

TaxSlayer LLC
- Type: Private
- Industry: Tax software
- Founded: 1965; 61 years ago
- Founder: Aubrey Rhodes, Sr.
- Headquarters: Augusta, Georgia
- Key people: Jamie Saxe (CEO)
- Products: Tax preparation; Tax return software
- Website: taxslayer.com

TaxSlayer LLC (formerly known as TaxSlayer.com) is a privately held tax preparation and tax software company based in Augusta, Georgia. The company offers online tax preparation for American consumers and tax professionals.

In 2015, Internal Revenue Service (IRS) awarded TaxSlayer with the exclusive five-year contracts for the Volunteer Income Tax Assistance (VITA) and Tax Counseling for the Elderly (TCE) programs, which provide online tax filing and preparation assistance for taxpayers who are low-income, elderly, disabled, or who have limited English language proficiency.

In 2010, the company built its headquarters building in Evans, Georgia, a large suburb of metro Augusta. In 2017, the company purchased a building in Downtown Augusta’s Innovation Zone.

The company is also known for its sports sponsorships, such as the TaxSlayer Gator Bowl, a major college football bowl game in Jacksonville, Florida previously known as the Gator Bowl. Other sports sponsorships have included: Dale Earnhardt Jr., NASCAR and the JR Motorsports team, as well as three PGA Tour golfers.

== History ==
In the early 1960s, Aubrey Rhodes Sr. established Rhodes-Murphy & Co., a full-service tax preparation company headquartered in Georgia, and continues to serve clients today. The company established a subsidiary, Rhodes Computer Services, to develop tax preparation software intended for tax preparers in addition to DIY client base.

Four years later, Rhodes Computer began selling taxation software known as "TaxSlayer Pro" to tax preparers and accountants throughout the United States. TaxSlayer was named for the original email address of Jimmy Rhodes, son of Aubrey and the president and CEO at the time.

In 1998, the firm began developing TaxSlayer.com to market its software to individuals. In January 2016, leadership of TaxSlayer passed to the third generation of the Rhodes family, including Brian Rhodes, Scott Rhodes and Ashleigh Wilder. The company subsequently invested in renovating a historic building in downtown Augusta, Georgia to establish an innovation and technology campus.

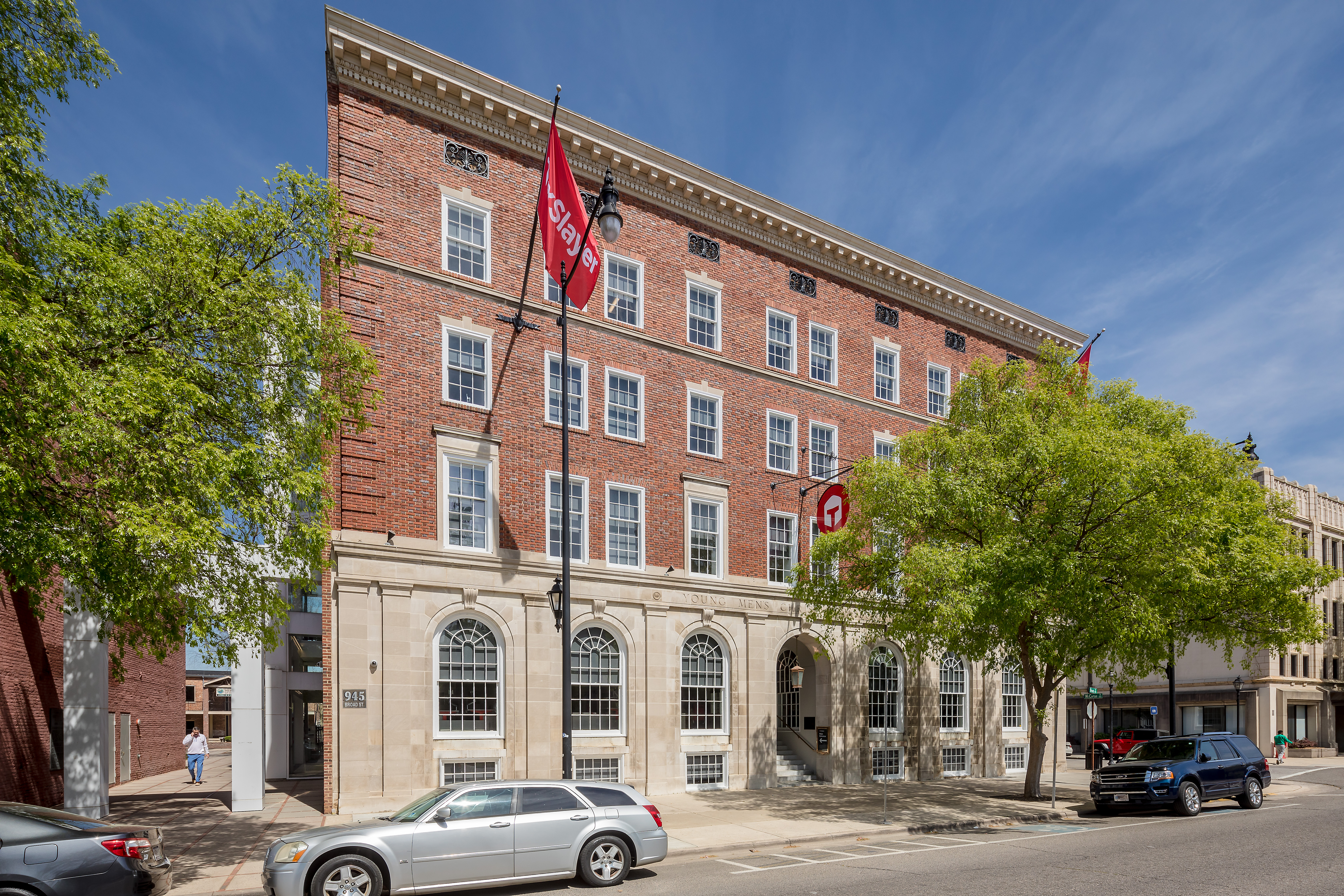
TaxSlayer headquarters located in Augusta, Georgia.

== Product offerings ==
TaxSlayer produces software for several different market segments: consumers, professional tax preparers and the IRS VITA (Volunteer Income Tax Assistance) and TCE (Tax Counseling for the Elderly) program volunteers. TaxSlayer’s consumer products allow taxpayers to electronically file their taxes online each year. The product provides different packages to provide varying levels of assistance to customers when filing tax returns.

TaxSlayer Pro is designed to be licensed by members of tax preparation practices and small to mid-sized accounting firms. It offers software for both desktop and cloud-based tax preparation. TaxSlayer Pro has been evaluated in surveys of tax preparation software conducted by the National Association of Tax Professionals (NATP)

== Government partnerships ==
=== IRS VITA/TCE ===
TaxSlayer maintains a continuing partnership with the Federal VITA and TCE programs. Both programs provide tax preparation assistance to Americans who may require assistance filing. VITA provides IRS-trained tax preparers who help those who are disabled, are low income, or limited in English proficiency, while TCE provides a similar service to the elderly. Both use TaxSlayer-provided software to aid them in their work.

=== Free File Alliance ===
TaxSlayer has participated in the IRS Free File program, which allows eligible taxpayers to prepare and electronically file federal income tax returns without charge. By participating in this program, TaxSlayer guarantees free preparation and e-filing to taxpayers who meet a set of income criteria.

== Sports sponsorships ==
The company is also known for its sports sponsorships, such as the Gator Bowl, a College football bowl game in Jacksonville, Florida, officially known as the TaxSlayer Gator Bowl, and Richard Childress Racing, as well as three PGA Tour golfers.

=== TaxSlayer Center ===
The TaxSlayer Center was a 12,000-seat arena located in Moline, Illinois, of the Quad Cities region. TaxSlayer purchased the naming rights to the stadium for a contract of more than $3.3 million, as part of a sponsorship agreement with the city. Later, those rights were transferred to Vibrant Credit Union.

=== College football ===
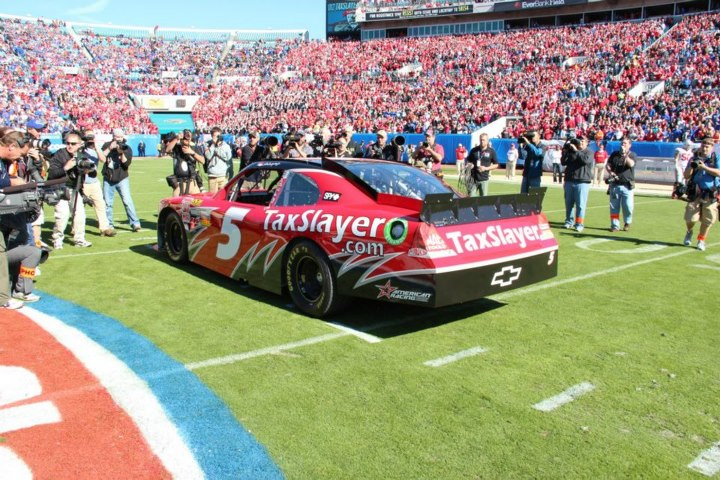
The TaxSlayer.com Nationwide Series car on the field during the 2012 Gator Bowl coin toss

In 2014 the company struck a new six-year deal with Gator Bowl Sports to rename the bowl the TaxSlayer Bowl beginning in 2015. In 2018, the game's name was updated to the TaxSlayer Gator Bowl, restoring "Gator" to the title to reflect the bowl's historic identity.

TaxSlayer.com has also been an associate sponsor of the Armed Forces Bowl and BBVA Compass Bowl.

=== NASCAR ===
TaxSlayer has been a primary sponsor of several top-tier NASCAR drivers, such as Bobby Labonte, Dale Earnhardt Jr., Regan Smith, and Myatt Snider.

=== Professional golf ===
TaxSlayer has sponsored PGA Tour golfers Patrick Reed, Henrik Norlander and Kevin Kisner.
