= Free File Alliance =

Group of tax preparation companies in the United States

Logo

The Free File Alliance is a consortium of tax preparation companies that operate a public-private partnership with the Internal Revenue Service (IRS) to provide free electronic tax filing services through the IRS Free File program for eligible United States taxpayers. To qualify for the program in tax year 2025, taxpayers must have an adjusted gross income (AGI) of $89,000 or less, as set by the IRS. However, participating companies may impose additional requirements and restrictions. The Free File program represents a public-private partnership between the IRS and private tax software providers, allowing lower- and middle-income taxpayers to file their taxes at no cost.

Free File Alliance is a 501(c)(4) organization registered as Free File, Inc., and based in Clifton, Virginia. Its executive director is Tim Hugo. While many of the Free File Companies offer free state income tax returns, some companies do charge additional fees of $10 to $30 to electronically prepare state returns.

As of the 2021 tax filing season, the two most used tax-filing software programs (TurboTax and H&R Block) no longer participate in the Free File program. With the two largest members of the Free File Alliance ending their participation in the Free File Program, there have been renewed calls for the IRS to develop and offer its own free tax-filing software to taxpayers.

For tax-filing season 2024, the IRS announced a pilot of Direct File, where people can calculate and submit their federal taxes and some state taxes in partnership with select state tax agencies for free. This initiative came as a result of the two largest members of the Free File Alliance ending their participation as well as the 2022 Inflation Reduction Act, signed into law by President Joe Biden. The second Trump administration canceled the Direct File program in November 2025.

== Members ==
For tax year 2024, there were 8 participating Alliance members with the following requirements to qualify to use their software for free under the Free File program:

- FreeTaxUSA.com, AGI of $48,000 or less (or less than $84,000 if active duty military). Free state return included.
- OnLine Taxes (OLT), AGI of $48,000 or less (or less than $84,000 if active duty military). Free state return included.
- TaxAct.com, AGI of $84,000 or less AND age between 20 and 59 or active military. Free state return in some states.
- TaxSlayer.com, AGI of $48,000 or less (or less than $84,000 if active duty military) or eligible for the Earned Income Tax Credit (EITC). Free state return in some states.
- FileYourTaxes.com, AGI between $8,500 and $84,000 AND age 64 or younger or active duty military. Free state return in some states.
- 1040NOW.net, AGI of $76,000 or less AND resident of certain states (or less than $84,000 if active duty military) or eligible for the Earned Income Tax Credit (EITC). No free state returns.
- ezTaxReturn.com, AGI of $84,000 or less AND age between 17 and 91 AND resident of certain states (or less than $84,000 if active duty military). No free state returns.
- 1040.com, AGI between $17,000 and $84,000 (or less than $84,000 if active duty military). Free state return in some states.

The free state and federal tax filing services provided by MyFreeTaxes, sponsored by the charitable organization United Way, and Cash App, which sells targeted advertising based on return data, are unrelated to the Free File program.

== Criticism ==
=== Significant under-use ===
In a typical year, about 70% of filers (roughly 100 million people) are eligible to use Free File, but only about three million do, according to Tim Hugo, the FFA's executive director. In 2019, for example, only 2.7% of the 104 million taxpayers eligible for Free File used it, while 34.5 million taxpayers eligible for Free File actually paid for tax software offered by companies in the Free File Alliance.

==== Difficult to use ====
A 2019 audit of the Free File system by the Treasury Inspector General for Tax Administration found that "the process taxpayers must follow to participate in the Free File Program is obscure and complex, and there is a lack of adequate advertising and oversight of the Program by the IRS".

==== Deliberate efforts to hide Free File services ====
The Free File Alliance has taken deliberate steps to hide its free services so that most filers continue to use paid tax preparation services. Methods used by the FFA to hide its free services and steer filers towards paid services include deliberately hiding free services from Google search results, deceptively marketing commercial tax preparation services as free and then upselling users paid services even when they are eligible for Free File, not including links to Free File services on their websites (TurboTax's Free File service, for instance, was not available on TurboTax.com), using dark patterns to push users towards paid services, and using confusing naming practices (for example, TurboTax called its Free File service the "Freedom Edition").

=== Lobbying efforts ===
The Free File Alliance (FFA) was largely organized by Intuit, and guided by a former lobbyist for the company. In 2019, ProPublica reported that tax preparation agencies used the Free File Alliance to head off the potential "encroachment" by the IRS, which could offer its own tax preparation service or introduce return-free filing. In exchange for Intuit, H&R Block, and other members providing Free File options, the IRS was restricted from providing its own free filing tool.

In 2020, the rule barring the IRS from designing its own filing service was lifted and providers were prohibited from hiding Free File options from search results. Despite publicly announcing their support for the changes, Intuit (the maker of TurboTax), as well as H&R Block, announced that they would be leaving the Free File Alliance.

=== Paid ancillary services ===
In 2007, Alliance members agreed to remove controversial ancillary offerings such as refund anticipation loans from the program, after half of Free File users making ancillary purchases stated their purchases were not intended.

== See also ==
- Tax preparation in the United States
- IRS e-file
- IRS Direct File
- Income tax in the United States
- Public-private partnerships in the United States
