= Income tax audit =

Examination of businesses or individual tax return by state tax authorities in the U.S.

In the United States, an income tax audit is the examination of a business or individual tax return by the Internal Revenue Service (IRS) or state tax authority. The IRS and various state revenue departments use the terms audit, examination, review, and notice to describe various aspects of enforcement and administration of the tax laws.

The IRS enforces the U.S. Federal tax law primarily through the examination of tax returns that have the highest potential for noncompliance. According to the IRS, "[t]his identification is determined using risk-based scoring mechanisms, data driven algorithms, third party information, whistleblowers and information provided by the taxpayer. The objective of an examination is to determine if income, expenses and credits are being reported accurately."

== Audit process ==
=== Selection process ===
Generally, the IRS will contact a taxpayer who has been selected for audit by mail, rather than initiating an audit by phone call or in person.

=== Providing documentation ===
The following are examples of documentation that the IRS may request: receipts, invoices, bank statements, and cancelled checks. Some electronic versions of documentation are acceptable. A good practice is to organize these documents by their tax year, and to provide the total amount summary in addition to the detailed transaction. If the taxpayer cannot provide source documentation for a particular amount, the taxpayer may explain why the document was missing and how the amount was calculated. The IRS will often ask that the taxpayer send only copies of these documents, as originals can get lost or damaged.

=== Review process ===
Examinations of documents are conducted either by mail or in a taxpayer’s home, business, or an accountant’s office. In-person review is preferred if a large amount of documentation is required. Further instructions and contact information is provided in the IRS Notice Letter.

=== Concluding an audit ===
The IRS or a tax authority can audit a tax return supported by its documentation and either conclude that there is no change, the taxpayer agreed, or the taxpayer disagreed. "No change" means the original amount owed or being refunded in the original tax return shall remain the same. On the other hand, IRS can propose a new amount in which the taxpayer can either agree or disagree with such amount. By agreeing, the taxpayer must sign an agreement and may have to pay the additional amount. If a taxpayer disagrees, they may request a meeting with an IRS manager, file an appeal, or participate in an Appeal Mediation, where an appeal officer will help resolve the case.

== Purpose ==
The purpose of a tax audit or a return examination is to determine whether reports filed with the taxing authorities are correct. The tax agencies identify and resolve taxpayer errors.

== Selection methods ==
There are several different methods used to select individuals and businesses for examination.

=== Third party documentation ===
Employers and financial institutions, among other organizations, are required by law to send documentation (W-2's and 1099's, for example) to the IRS. The IRS uses software to ensure that the numbers on a tax return match the numbers the IRS receives from third parties. If the documentation does not match, the return may be examined.

=== DIF score ===
When a tax return is filed, the IRS uses computer software called the Discriminant Index Function System (DIF) to analyze the return for oddities and discrepancies. Once the return has been processed through DIF, it is given a score. If the DIF score is high enough (i.e. a large amount of oddities or discrepancies are found), that tax return may be selected for examination. The formulas the IRS use to create the DIF software and analysis are a closely guarded secret.

=== UIDIF score ===
Filed tax returns are also subjected to an evaluation called the UIDIF, or the Unreported Income Discriminant Index Function System. This evaluation involves the analysis of tax returns based on a series of factors to determine a tax return's potential for unreported income. Returns that are found to have a high UIDIF score (i.e. the likelihood of unreported income) and a high DIF score may be selected for examination. The IRS formulas used to calculated UDIF are secret, but it is commonly thought that the IRS uses statistical comparisons between returns to determine UIDIF potential.

=== Random selection ===
The IRS selects a certain number of income tax returns to be audited each year through random selection. No errors need to be found for the Enforcement branch to examine a tax return. However, the likelihood of being subject to such an examination increases with an individual's statistical deviation from a 'normal' return. For instance, if the average single taxpayer with a yearly income of $60,000 were to contribute $550 to charitable contribution, and such an individual submitted a return claiming a $15,000 charitable contribution, then their income return would be more likely to get audited. Random selection exams tend to be more extensive and time-consuming than other forms of review.

==== Controversy ====
The practice of random selection has been a source of controversy for many years. The practice was suspended for a short time in the early 2000s amid criticism that the audits were too burdensome and intrusive. The IRS revived the practice in the fall of 2006.

In April 2019, Propublica reported that IRS audit selection methodology, with its emphasis on Earned Income Tax Credit (EITC) claimants, resulted in a higher audit rate of low-income African-Americans in U.S. counties located in the Southern states, Hispanic taxpayers in counties along the Texas-Mexico border, and certain counties with a high percentage of Native Americans.

=== Related examination ===
The IRS sometimes selects taxpayers who are involved with other taxpayers who have recently been selected for audits, such as business partners or investors.

== Audit rate ==
Below are the audit rates from the IRS website data for 2018 individual income tax returns.

Total positive income	Total returns filed in TY2018	Returns examined*	Percent covered
No total positive income	688,753	33,168	4.82
$1 under $25,000	49,364,340	207,726	0.42
$25,000 under $50,000	36,664,872	91,508	0.25
$50,000 under $75,000	21,730,391	45,773	0.21
$75,000 under $100,000	13,988,214	30,199	0.22
$100,000 under $200,000	22,077,272	52,540	0.24
$200,000 under $500,000	7,377,133	18,381	0.25
$500,000 under $1,000,000	1,249,264	4,993	0.40
$1,000,000 under $5,000,000	566,107	6,211	1.10
$5,000,000 under $10,000,000	41,434	806	1.95
$10,000,000 and above	26,517	2,307	8.70

== Taxpayer rights & tax audit representation ==
When a return is selected for examination, the taxpayer has certain rights during the process.

=== Taxpayer rights ===
Each state will have its own version of taxpayer rights with respect to state taxes. With respect to U.S. federal income taxation, the taxpayer has the following rights:

- A right to professional and courteous treatment by IRS employees.
- A right to privacy and confidentiality about tax matters.
- A right to know why the IRS is asking for information, how the IRS will use it and what will happen if the requested information is not provided.
- A right to representation, by oneself or with an authorized representative.
- A right to appeal disagreements, both within the IRS and before the courts.
- A right to be provided with all information concerning with any changes on tax administration

A taxpayer is required to submit to the auditor only information relating to the specific year listed in the audit notice.

=== Tax audit representation ===
Audit representation, also called audit defense, occurs when a tax or legal professional stands in on behalf of a taxpayer during an examination. Federal law and all states allow a taxpayer to have an authorized representative. The representative must have permission to practice before the IRS or state, and specific credentials are required. The types of representatives who are allowed to represent taxpayers before the IRS in income tax audits include attorneys, certified public accountants (CPAs), and enrolled agents.

== See also ==
- Taxation in the United States
- Tax evasion in the United States
- Payroll taxes in the United States
- Federal Insurance Contributions Act tax
- Corporate tax in the United States
- Internal Revenue Service
- Performance bond
- Contingent workforce
- Freelance marketplace
