= CalFile =

Tax preparation program

CalFile is the current tax preparation program/service of the California Franchise Tax Board (FTB).

ReadyReturn is the former tax preparation program initiated by the FTB as a pilot in 2005, tax returns for the 2004 tax year, based on their 2003 tax data, went out to 51,850 taxpayers receiving a "pre-populated" form based on financial information reported to the FTB by employers and banks. Recipients were single, no-dependents, standard-deduction, only-wage-income, one-employer, with a maximum adjusted gross income of $139,917. The purpose of ReadyReturn was to make it easier for taxpayers to file their returns, and to make the filing process more accurate and faster.

CalFile and ReadyReturn at one point coexisted for different taxpayer categories. In 2015, ReadyReturn's best features were included in CalFile, and ReadyReturn was no longer a separate program.

== ReadyReturn ==
=== Background ===
More than 20 other countries implement prepopulated returns for some of their taxpayers. Denmark began a prefilled return program in 1988, and has an 80-percent participation rate. Chile, Finland, Malta, New Zealand, Norway, and Sweden have similar programs available to most taxpayers. Singapore, South Africa, Spain, and Turkey have similar programs available to at least 30 percent of taxpayers. Australia, Estonia, France, Hong Kong, Iceland, Italy, Lithuania, and Poland have similar programs available and are used by some taxpayers.

In the 1990s, Michigan offered return-free filing but dropped the program due to lack of participation, Louisiana planned but dropped implementation due to Y2K problems, and Minnesota proposed but did not enact return-free filing.

In March 2017, the effort to establish ReadyReturn in California was the subject of an episode of NPR's Planet Money podcast.

=== Origins ===
In 2004, the FTB staffers told Joseph Bankman, a leading scholar in the field of tax law, a clinical psychologist, and professor of law and business at Stanford Law School, that they realized that they had all the data they needed to fill out Californians' tax returns for millions of Californians whose entire income came from one job.

In 2005, Joseph Bankman worked with the state of California to create ReadyReturn, a pilot study with a completed tax return prepared by the state (not an individual or tax professional) that was available to single, no-dependant, standard-deduction, one-employer, wages-only taxpayers for the 2005 filing season.

When the FTB launched the ReadyReturn website, Intuit sued and lobbied California legislators to kill the program.

=== Methodology ===
In the pilot, taxpayers were allowed to file the return as given to them, to modify and then file it, or to ignore it and file however they normally would. Of the 50,000 participants in the pilot, 38,500 chose to ignore the return and approximately 11,500 filed it. A survey of pilot participants found more than 90 percent said they saved time using ReadyReturn and that it was more convenient than the system they had used previously. 99 percent said they would use it again the next year. 0.3 percent of ReadyReturn filings contained errors versus 3.1 percent of non-ReadyReturn filings.

=== Opposition ===
Between 2001 and 2010, Intuit Inc., maker of the tax-preparation software TurboTax, spent more than $1.7 million (equivalent to $2.51 million in 2025) on lobbying in an attempt to kill ReadyReturn. A bill to provide explicit statutory authorization for ReadyReturn and to make the program permanent died without a vote in the 2006 session of the California State Legislature. California State Controller Steve Westly said he was stunned by the response from taxpayers who used the program as part of the pilot project, about 96 percent of whom said it is a service government should provide, and one they would use again,

"I absolutely have come to believe that ReadyReturn is the right thing to do".
—California Controller, Steve Westly

No ReadyReturn forms were used for the 2006 tax year, but the FTB revived it on their own for the 2007 tax year, expanding it to cover one million Californians.

=== Reception ===
In 2012, 88,652 California taxpayers used the system, and, with paper returns costing more than seven times a ReadyReturn return to process, it saved the state an estimated $125,000. 99 percent stated they were satisfied with ReadyReturn, 97 percent stated this is the type of service government should provide, 96 percent stated it was more convenient than how they filed in the past, 95 percent stated it saved them time, and 98 percent stated they would use it again.

== CalFile ==
CalFile is the current free tax preparation program, initiated by the FTB, to file state tax returns online directly to the FTB. It is available to single users with incomes under $203,341 and married users with incomes under $406,687 and takes 20 minutes to complete a return for most users, with direct deposit refunds usually within 7 to 10 days.

=== History ===
CalFile became available in 2003. In 2011, 6.4 million filers were eligible. Some features of ReadyReturn are now part of CalFile.

=== Economics ===
Dennis J. Ventry Jr. professor at UC Davis School of Law, who specializes in tax policy and legal ethics, describes it as a "a reliable, voluntary, safe and free way to calculate and file [...] taxes". The FTB says CalFile annually saves taxpayers somewhere between $4 million and $10 million in tax preparation fees, and the state of California saves approximately $500,000 in digitization overhead and administrative costs.

=== Opposition ===
CalFile has faced lobbying campaigns by market competitors in private tax-preparing software like Intuit. These lobbying campaigns have dissuaded the Internal Revenue Service (IRS) commissioner from implementing a free online federal tax preparation program. ProPublica notes that Intuit's product TurboTax "rests on a shaky foundation, one that could collapse overnight if the US government did what most wealthy countries did long ago and made tax filing simple and free for most citizens".
