= Free File =

United States government service

The IRS Free File Program is a public-private partnership between the Internal Revenue Service and private-sector tax software companies that enables U.S. taxpayers to prepare and electronically file their federal income tax returns at no cost using the companies' tax software. The program is operated in partnership with commercial tax software companies that are members of the Free File Alliance, who provide free tax preparation software to eligible taxpayers with an adjusted gross income (AGI) below $89,000 for Tax Year 2025. This income threshold is adjusted annually, and is designed to cover the lowest 70 percent of American income earners. In addition, free fillable tax forms are available to all taxpayers as part of the program, regardless of income.

More than 77 million American taxpayers have used the Free File service to file their federal income tax returns (and often state income tax returns) since the program's inception in 2003. Using a conservative savings estimate of $30 per return, the IRS Free File Program has saved taxpayers more than $2.3 billion that they otherwise would have spent for tax preparation during this period.

Through the program, 70 percent of U.S. taxpayers are eligible to use commercial software for free to file their tax returns and almost all taxpayers can use free fillable electronic versions of paper forms to electronically file their tax returns. Over the life of the program, about 3 million taxpayers have used the free tax software each year. The private-sector tax preparation companies and some Members of Congress have encouraged the IRS to promote the Free File Program more actively to increase its annual usage. The program costs the federal government nothing to operate, other than the time of three agency staffers who administer it for IRS. In 2019, investigations by ProPublica asserted that companies such as Intuit (makers of TurboTax) and H&R Block misled taxpayers into paying for tax preparation services despite qualifying under the Free File Program.

As of the 2021 tax filing season, two of the most used tax-filing software programs (TurboTax and H&R Block) no longer participate in the Free File Program, although usage of Free File continued to increase despite their departure. With the two largest members of the Free File Alliance ending their participation in the Free File Program, there were renewed calls for the IRS to develop and offer their own free tax-filing software to taxpayers which led to the creation of IRS Direct File.

== History ==
In November 2001, the U.S. Office of Management and Budget's (OMB) Quicksilver Task Force established 24 e-government initiatives that were a part of the President's Management Agenda. These initiatives were designed to improve Government to Government, Government to Business, and Government to Citizen electronic capabilities.

One initiative, IRS Free File, instructed the IRS to provide free and secure online tax return preparation and filing services to taxpayers. In accordance with this OMB directive, the IRS began working in partnership with the tax software industry to develop a solution. The result was the formation of the Free File Alliance, LLC, a group of tax software companies which provide free commercial online tax preparation and electronic filing services.

According to investigations by the news organization ProPublica, TurboTax maker Intuit allegedly engaged in practices that hid the Free File Program from eligible taxpayers, and attempted to trick eligible taxpayers into paying for services they might be eligible to receive for free.

In 2020, H&R Block ended its participation in the Free File Program. In July 2021, Intuit announced that its TurboTax product would no longer participate in the Free File Program effective as of the 2021 tax season. For tax-filing season 2026, eight tax software companies are participating in the Free File Program.

== Free File Alliance ==
The Free File Alliance is a consortium of commercial tax preparation software providers that offer their brand-name tax software products for free to lower and middle-income tax filers. Each member is allowed to set eligibility requirements for their software products. However, the cumulative offers must allow 70 percent of U.S. taxpayers - approximately 100 million people - to be eligible for at least one product. Each year, the income limit for eligibility is adjusted to reach 70 percent of the taxpayers. The income limit for 2026 (tax year 2025) is set at $89,000, though some Free File software providers choose to set the income threshold lower. Agreements between the IRS and the Free File Alliance are publicly available. The latest memorandum of understanding was signed in 2024 and runs through 2029.

== Free File Software ==
The Free File Program, a public-private partnership between IRS and private-sector tax software companies, allows lower- and middle-income taxpayers to use name-brand tax preparation software to prepare and file tax forms for free.

For Tax Year 2025, anyone whose adjusted gross income is $89,000 or less will be eligible for at least one software product. There are eight products from which to choose. Each software provider sets its own eligibility requirements, generally related to income, state residency, age, military service or eligibility for the earned income tax credit. Free File is free for federal tax returns only. However, some Free File Alliance members offer state return software for a fee or for free. Most of the software products, but not all, use an interview format in which you are asked questions and your answers are used to populate the electronic form. This format helps taxpayers get the tax credits and deductions to which they are eligible. It also means taxpayers do not have to be experts in income tax law. Alliance members cannot sell any refund anticipation loan products or other products through the Free File service.

To use IRS Free File, taxpayers generally go through the IRS website. There, taxpayers can find a tax software product one of two ways. They can review a list of companies and their offers. Or, they can use a simple web tool that asks a few questions - such as income, state residency and age - and the tool will locate those software products for which taxpayers are eligible. Once a taxpayer chooses a product, they will be directed off the IRS.gov site and onto the Alliance member's website to complete their federal tax return.

== Free File Fillable Forms ==
Another component of Free File is Free File Fillable Forms, which is available to all taxpayers, including taxpayers whose adjusted gross incomes (AGI) are greater than $89,000. It is an alternative to Free File Software, although both are free. Free File Fillable Forms is operated by a private organization, the Free File Alliance and not the IRS. Though IRS links to it, they do not endorse it or any product.

Free File Fillable Forms is an electronic version of IRS paper forms. Free File Fillable Forms does not include any elaborate cross-checking or question-and-answer formats (such as is found in many of the Free File Software packages), instead it is a simple fill-in-the blank format (however, it does perform math calculations). Free File Fillable Forms is best for taxpayers who are comfortable preparing their own tax returns or who have been long-time paper filers. There are no income restrictions for using Free File Fillable Forms. It does not support any state tax returns.

== See also ==
- IRS Direct File
