= Form 2290 =

U.S. federal tax form

Form 2290 (Heavy Highway Vehicle Use Tax Return)
- Subject: Heavy Vehicle Use Tax
- Purpose: Report and pay HVUT on highway motor vehicles with a taxable gross weight of 55,000 lb or more

Official website
- https://www.irs.gov/forms-pubs/about-form-2290

Form 2290, officially the Heavy Highway Vehicle Use Tax Return, is a United States federal tax form issued by the Internal Revenue Service (IRS). It is used to report and pay the Heavy Vehicle Use Tax (HVUT) on highway motor vehicles with a taxable gross weight of 55,000 pounds or more that operate on public highways. Revenues from the HVUT are deposited into the Highway Trust Fund to support road construction and maintenance.

== Purpose and scope ==
Form 2290 is used to figure and pay HVUT on vehicles 55,000 pounds or more; to pay tax when a previously suspended vehicle exceeds the mileage use limit during the period; to report and pay additional tax when a vehicle’s taxable gross weight increases into a new category; to claim suspension when use is expected to be 5,000 miles or less (7,500 for agricultural vehicles); and to claim a credit or refund for vehicles that were destroyed, stolen, sold, or used under the mileage limit.

== Filing requirements ==
The tax period runs from July 1 through June 30 of the following year. The due date for filing Form 2290 and paying the tax is the last day of the month following the month the vehicle was first used on a public highway.

When the IRS accepts the return, it stamps and returns Schedule 1, which serves as proof of payment. This stamped Schedule 1 is typically required for vehicle registration with state departments of motor vehicles.

In July 2026, the IRS released a draft revision of Form 2290 (Rev. July 2026) covering the tax period from July 1, 2026 through June 30, 2027.

Any individual or entity must file Form 2290 and Schedule 1 for the tax period if a taxable highway motor vehicle is registered, or required to be registered, in their name under U.S., District of Columbia, Canadian, or Mexican law at the time of its first use during the period and the vehicle has a taxable gross weight of 55,000 pounds or more. Filers may be individuals, LLCs, corporations, partnerships, nonprofits, or other organizations; disregarded entities and QSubs must file under their own EINs for excise tax purposes.

To complete Form 2290, filers must have (1) an Employer Identification Number (EIN)—a Social Security number cannot be used—(2) the Vehicle Identification Number (VIN) of each vehicle, and (3) the taxable gross weight of each vehicle.

U.S. Customs and Border Protection requires proof of HVUT payment (Schedule 1) for Canadian or Mexican vehicles entering the United States, and state motor vehicle departments generally require Schedule 1 as proof of payment for registration.

A vehicle qualifies as a logging vehicle if it is used exclusively to transport products harvested from a forested site (including timber processed by sawing, chipping, or milling before leaving the site) and is registered as used exclusively in transporting harvested forest products. Logging vehicles are taxed at reduced HVUT rates.

HVUT is prorated when a vehicle is first used after July; the tax is based on the number of months remaining in the period using the Partial-Period Tax Tables in the instructions (Table I for non-logging vehicles and Table II for logging vehicles).

If the taxable gross weight of a vehicle increases so that it falls into a new weight category, the filer must report and pay additional tax for the remainder of the period as an amended return, indicating the month of the increase.

Filers should use the check boxes on Form 2290 when applicable: mark “Final return” if there are no longer vehicles to report; mark “Amended return” only to report additional tax from a weight increase or when a suspended vehicle exceeds the mileage-use limit; and mark “VIN correction” to correct a VIN shown on a previously filed Schedule 1 for the same tax period and attach an explanation.

=== Penalties ===
Penalties and interest may apply for late filing or late payment. Taxpayers who believe they had reasonable cause may request penalty relief by writing to the IRS or by following the penalty-relief procedures described by the IRS.

== Electronic filing ==
The IRS requires taxpayers reporting 25 or more vehicles on Form 2290 to file electronically, though e-file is encouraged for all filers.

The IRS maintains a list of approved MeF software providers that have passed its Assurance Testing System; these providers can transmit Form 2290 returns but are not affiliated with the IRS.

Electronic filing allows payment by credit or debit card, electronic funds withdrawal with the e-filed return, or through the Electronic Federal Tax Payment System (EFTPS).

== Industry coverage and impact ==
Industry publications frequently report on filing deadlines and compliance challenges faced by carriers. For example, Transport Topics and FreightWaves have published annual reminders noting the August 31 deadline for filing and paying the Heavy Vehicle Use Tax (HVUT).

Publications such as Overdrive magazine also provide guidance for owner-operators on how to file Form 2290, what documentation is required, and how to avoid related penalties.

== See also ==
- Highway Trust Fund
- Federal Motor Carrier Safety Administration
- Internal Revenue Service
