= Tax audit representation =

Tax audit representation, also called audit defense, is a service in which a tax or legal professional stands in on behalf of a taxpayer (an individual or legal entity) during an Internal Revenue Service (IRS) or state income tax audit.

== Overview ==
In the United States, during an income tax audit or examination, the IRS and all states allow a taxpayer to have an authorized representative. The representative must be authorized to practice before the IRS or state, and specific credentials are required. The types of representatives who are allowed to represent taxpayers before the IRS in income tax audits include attorneys, certified public accountants, and enrolled agents.

An audit representative develops the strategy used to defend the taxpayer's position. He or she assists the taxpayer in preparing all documents requested by the taxing authority and typically attends all meetings and handles correspondence on behalf of the taxpayer.

== Pre-paid audit representation ==
While many tax professionals offer audit representation services to their clients, some companies offer pre-paid services. In an August, 1979 article in the Journal of Accountancy, Professors Ray Roberts, CPA and Philip Storrer, CPA proposed the idea of "prepaid tax return audit fees". Addressing the high costs of retaining professional help during an audit, the professors suggested to fellow accountants that they offer their clients the opportunity to prepay audit representation fees for a small amount.
