= National Consumer Law Center =

US non-profit organization

- Company type: Nonprofit organization
- Genre: Advocacy, Consumer advice
- Founded: 1969
- Founder: Robert F. Drinan
- Headquarters: Boston, Massachusetts, United States
- Revenue: 12,170,618 United States dollar (2017)
- Total assets: 35,032,375 United States dollar (2022)
- Number of employees: 51 to 200
- Website: www.nclc.org

The National Consumer Law Center (NCLC) is an American nonprofit organization headquartered in Boston, Massachusetts, specializing in consumer issues on behalf of low-income people. Legal services, government, and private attorneys, as well as community organizations, work with the center to advocate for state and federal consumer reform. NCLC was founded in 1969 out of the Boston College School of Law.

== Focus areas ==
NCLC represents low-income individuals with a focus on consumer issues, such as credit card debt, mortgage lending, and student loans. NCLC also offers fellowships and externships to law students in the scope of public interest work.

In 2019, NCLC testified before the U.S. House of Representatives Committee on Financial Services regarding “Who’s Keeping Score? Holding Credit Bureaus Accountable and Repairing a Broken System."

In 2023, NCLC petitioned the Consumer Financial Protection Bureau to address its Fair Credit Reporting Act rulemaking and requirements regarding debt collection.

In 2025, NCLC supported the Homebuyers Privacy Protection Act, which restricts the use of “trigger leads” in the mortgage industry. Industry groups like the American Bankers Association and Mortgage Bankers Association also supported the bill, which was signed into law in September 2025.

== Publications ==
NCLC publishes treatises on consumer law and practice manuals for attorneys. These resources are available through the organization's digital library. NCLC also produces resources for consumers, including the book Surviving Debt, which provides advice from consumer law experts on navigating various forms of debt.
