= Tax preparation in the United States =

Tax preparation is the process of preparing tax returns, particularly income tax returns, on behalf of a taxpayer, typically for compensation. Taxpayers may complete their own returns, either manually or with the assistance of tax preparation software and online services. Alternatively, tax preparation may be conducted by licensed professionals such as attorneys, certified public accountants (CPAs), or enrolled agents, as well as by unlicensed tax preparation businesses. Some U.S. states impose licensing requirements for individuals or entities that prepare tax returns for compensation, which may apply to federal, state, or both types of tax returns.

United States income tax laws are considered to be complicated, leading many taxpayers to seek outside assistance with taxes (53.5% of individual tax returns in 2016 were filed by paid preparers). Commercial tax preparation companies have extensively lobbied against the Internal Revenue Service (IRS) creating its own free online system of tax filing like those that exist in most other wealthy countries.

The Free File Alliance provides free tax preparation software for individuals with less than $72,000 of adjusted gross income for tax year 2020. People who make more than $72,000 can use Free File Fillable Forms, electronic versions of U.S. Internal Revenue Service (IRS) paper forms. The IRS under the Joe Biden administration introduced a free electronic tax filing system, enabling individuals to avoid buying services from commercial tax preparation companies. The Republican Party and tax preparation companies have criticized this free electronic tax filing system and sought to end it.

== National registration of paid preparers ==
In 2007, the IRS estimated that there were between 900,000 and 1.2 million paid preparers.

Until 2011, the IRS did not have a requirement for national registration of paid tax return preparers in the United States. Effective January 1, 2011, new rules required the registration of almost all paid federal tax return preparers. Many of the new rules, however, were soon struck down by a federal court.

The new rules had required that some paid preparers pass a national tax law exam and undergo continuing education requirements. Persons who are certified public accountants (CPAs), attorneys or enrolled agents were required to register, but were not required to take the exam and were not subject to the continuing education requirements.

For purposes of the registration requirement, the IRS had defined a "tax return preparer" as "an individual who, for compensation, prepares all or substantially all of a federal tax return or claim for refund." Beginning in mid-2011, tax return preparers (other than CPAs, attorneys, and enrolled agents and a few others) had generally been required to take and pass a competency test to become a registered tax return preparer.

Tax return preparers who had a Preparer Tax Identification Number (PTIN) before testing was to become available were to have until December 31, 2013, to pass the competency test. New tax return preparers would have been required to pass the competency test before they could obtain a PTIN. The IRS had indicated that the new rules would have applied to all kinds of federal tax returns, including income taxes and payroll taxes. A new continuing education requirement of 15 hours per year would have been imposed on tax return preparers (except for CPAs, attorneys, enrolled agents, and a few others).

In 2013, however, the United States District Court for the District of Columbia struck down most of these rules in the Loving case, holding that the Internal Revenue Service had no authority to require competency exams for tax preparers. The Court did indicate its decision did not affect the PTIN requirement. This requirement remains in effect.

All tax return preparers, including those tax return preparers who are attorneys, certified public accountants, or enrolled agents, are still required to have a PTIN. This rule continues to be effective for preparation of any federal tax returns after December 31, 2010.

The office of the National Taxpayer Advocate has reported that of 76,715,982 U.S. individual income tax returns (Forms 1040, 1040A and 1040EZ) prepared by paid return preparers that were filed for the tax year 2017, a total of 39,252,790 returns were prepared by unenrolled preparers. For that tax year, a total of 22,837,596 individual returns were prepared by CPAs, and 9,509,999 were prepared by enrolled agents. The rest were prepared by attorneys and other practitioners.

== Controversy ==
=== Impact of lobbying ===
For most US taxpayers, the IRS already collects all the information needed to send them a draft tax filing like a credit card statement. Taxpayers could decide not to accept that and instead use any of the other options currently used today. Or they could simply accept the draft tax filing, sign and return it with a check in the appropriate amount if they owed anything; if not, they'd receive the indicted refund, as they would otherwise.

For-profit tax preparation companies such as Intuit, the developer of TurboTax, have lobbied for at least 20 years to prevent the IRS from offering return-free filing, simpler returns, or its own free electronic filing portal. Between 2013 and 2020, Intuit and H&R Block have each spent at least $2 million annually on lobbying.

Anti-tax activist groups, including Grover Norquist's Americans for Tax Reform, have also joined in lobbying against measures which would simplify tax returns, seeing frustration with filing as fuel for voter resistance to government growth.

This lobbying resulted in the introduction of the Taxpayer First Act of 2019. ProPublica reported that Intuit, H&R Block and other tax preparation services made it exceedingly difficult and almost impossible for a taxpayer who qualified to file for free to actually find how to do that. After the ProPublica exposé, the Free File provision was removed from the bill.

=== Federal ===
The cost of preparing and filing all business and personal tax returns is estimated to be $100 to $150 billion each year. According to a 2005 report from the U.S. Government Accountability Office, the efficiency cost of the tax system—the output that is lost over and above the tax itself—is between $240 billion and $600 billion per year. In addition to the amount collected in taxes, Americans spent roughly 6% of that amount in their efforts to comply with the law and between 12% and 30% more in doing things that would not have to be done if the tax system were more rational (though estimating the costs of compliance and efficiency losses is difficult because neither the government nor taxpayers maintain regular accounts of these costs). Beyond those issues, tax preparation businesses have been plagued with controversies over refund anticipation loans.

==== Tax Filing Simplification Act of 2022 ====
The Tax Filing Simplification Act of 2022 was introduced by Senator Warren on July 13, 2022 with 22 cosponsors. A companion bill was introduced the next day in the US House with 48 cosponsors.

The Taxpayers Protection Alliance opposed this bill, saying "giving the IRS more power to prepare tax returns is both an overreach and a conflict of interest. ... From leaked private tax information to strong-arming poor people with audits, power should be taken away from the agency." (The Markup later reported that online tax preparation software companies like Intuit / Turbotax, H & R Block and others were not adequately protecting their clients confidential data, which was being harvested and shared with Meta / Facebook, so ads could be more accurately targeted, raising questions about whether government or private companies better protects people's data. As to who is "strong-arming poor people", ProPublica and Lessig insist that tax preparation companies and big business more generally make money from blocking legislation like this.)

Similarly, the National Taxpayers Union insisted that Senator Warren's bill was "anything but simple. ... The IRS additionally already has a free option available to all taxpayers, ... a result of an agreement between the IRS and the Free File Alliance (FFA), a nonprofit coalition of tax software companies. Sen. Warren claims these companies are detrimental when they are in fact voluntarily assisting millions of taxpayers filing their tax returns for free", a claim contradicted by a ProPublica investigation.

NC Policy Watch agreed with ProPublica, saying: "The Tax Filing Simplification Act would require the IRS to give people easy access to wage and other data needed to file a tax return that the agency already has in its possession. Such a system of pre-filled tax returns is not new; other countries already do it this way, making filing taxes a zip ... . This legislation would also allow taxpayers with simple returns to choose to have the government fully prepare their tax returns ... [for] free. Why doesn’t our country make it free and easy for people to file their tax returns? Because a few big corporations profit from the current, dysfunctional system."

Neither bill received a hearing.

=== California ===
The ReadyReturn program in California, begun as a pilot in 2005 (revived in 2007 and later integrated into CalFile) sends taxpayers believed to need simple tax returns a proposed draft of a return. Taxpayers can accept or modify the draft or, if they prefer, they can ignore the draft and complete their tax return without the draft. The process is similar to receiving a credit card bill where the recipient can dispute charges they did not authorize. This system is used in countries that include Denmark, Sweden, and Spain. Intuit and the tax preparation service H&R Block have disclosed lobbying Congress against setting up a similar system for federal U.S. tax returns. Intuit spent about $3 million on lobbying in California from 2005 to 2010, where it unsuccessfully opposed the ReadyReturn program.

=== Sharing data with Meta / Facebook ===
On November 22, 2022, The Markup reported that "Tax Filing Websites [including TurboTax, H&R Block and others] Have Been Sending Users’ Financial Information to Facebook" to facilitate targeting ads.

== Companies ==
Many companies and local businesses offer tax preparation services through their branches. Some of the most well known include: H&R Block, Jackson Hewitt, and Liberty Tax Service.

== Software ==
I use the computer to do my income tax. My economic life is a mess of $2.75 parking-lot tickets and $13.89 lunch receipts, which used to pile up like fall leaves until I spent a week burrowing through them at income-tax time. Now all I do is sit down at the machine for five minutes every few nights and type in all transactions of interest to the tax man—so much in from my employers, so much out to the credit-card company. At the end of the year, I load the income-tax program into the computer, push the button marked "Run," and watch as my tax return is prepared. Since it took me only about six months to learn BASIC (and the tax laws) well enough to write the program, I figure this approach will save me time by 1993.

— James Fallows, 1982

TurboTax remains the most popular tax preparation software in the United States, with over 40 million users annually and processing over 74 million federal returns in 2024.H&R Block at Home (formerly TaxCut) is the second most popular with a 14% share. Other popular tax software includes: TaxACT at 7%, Tax Hawk (including FreeTaxUSA) at 5.9%, Credit Karma's free tax software (now owned by the Cash App) at 1.7%, and TaxSlayer at 1.5%. According to a survey by Credello, 53% of respondents filed their taxes with an online software system and 12% filed their taxes independent of a software system.

The Free File Alliance is a group of tax preparation companies that have partnered with the Internal Revenue Service to provide free electronic tax filing services to U.S taxpayers meeting certain income guidelines. In 2019, the Free File Alliance was accused by ProPublica of preventing the IRS from providing simpler options or return-free filing. They reported that most tax companies have lobbied to make it as difficult as possible for taxpayers to use their Free File options and push users to their paid services.

== See also ==
- Tax return (United States)
