= Refund anticipation loan =

Short-term consumer loan against an expected tax refund

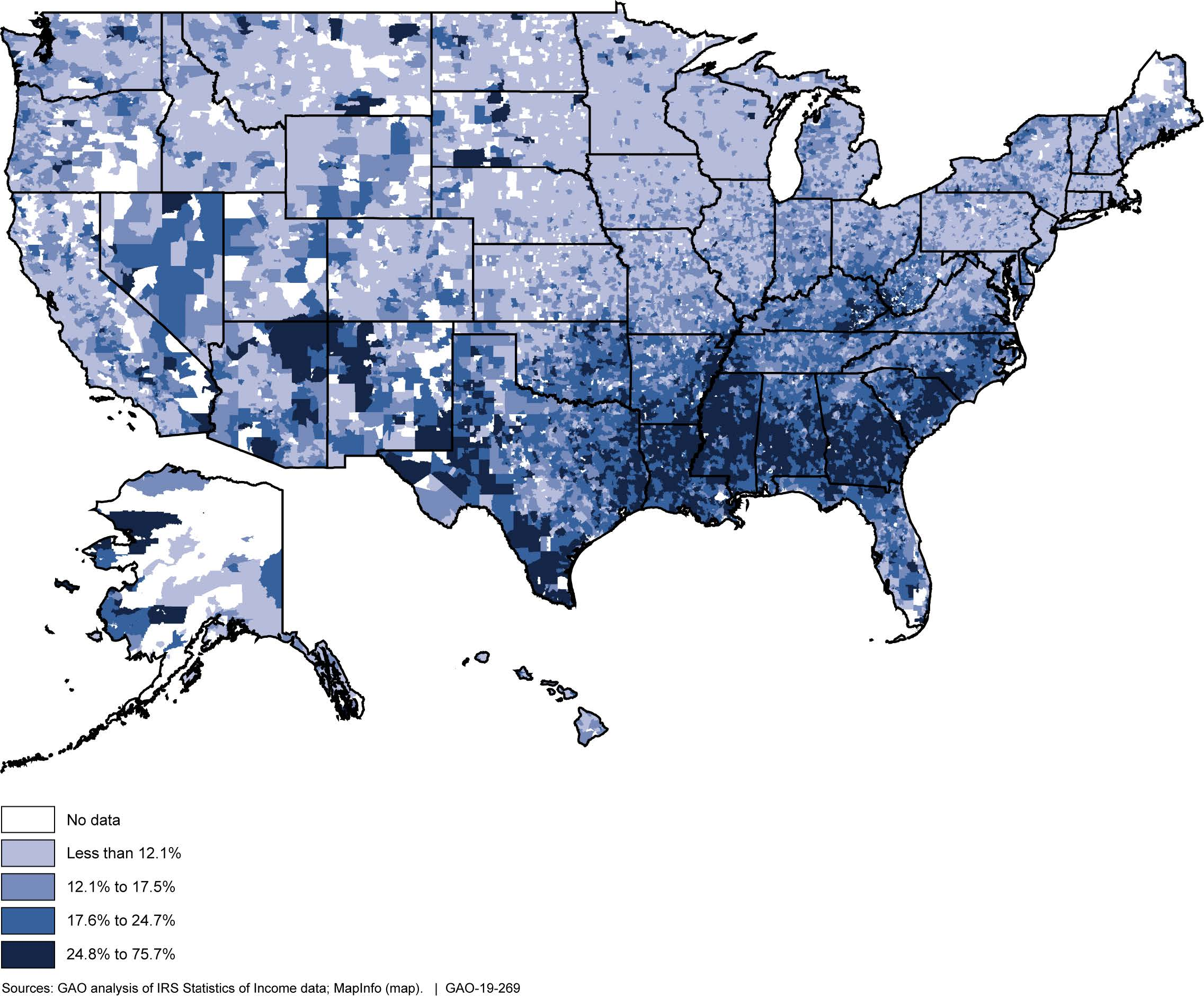
Use of tax-time financial products, such as refund anticipation loans, in 2016

Refund anticipation loan (RAL) is a short-term consumer loan in the United States provided by a third party against an expected tax refund for the duration it takes the tax authority to pay the refund. The loan term was usually about two to three weeks, related to the time it took the U.S. Internal Revenue Service to deposit refunds in electronic accounts. The loans were designed to make the refund available in as little as 24 hours. They were secured by a taxpayer's expected tax refund, and designed to offer customers quicker access to funds.

The costs to the borrower could be high compared to other lending and some consumer organizations warned consumers of the risk involved in this type of loan. They are a largely discontinued financial product and beginning with the 2013 tax filing season, they have been largely replaced with the similar refund anticipation checks (RAC), as well as a hodgepodge of other financial products.

RACs are temporary accounts which wait for the client's IRS tax refund, and which also provides a way for the client to pay for tax preparation out of the refund. Both financial products have similar fees and similar risks of third-party bank "cross-collection".

A similar process in Canada to a RAL is termed "tax rebate discounting".

== United States ==
In the United States before the 2013 tax filing season, taxpayers could apply for a refund anticipation loan through a paid professional tax preparation service, where a fee is typically charged for the preparation of the tax return. Internal Revenue Service rules prohibit basing this fee on the amount of the expected refund. An additional fee was usually charged for the services of originating a bank product and establishing a short-term bank account. By law this fee must be the same on both loan and non-loan bank products, and in 2004 the average fee was $32. The bank through which the loan was made charges finance charges.

According to the National Consumer Law Center, 12 million taxpayers used a RAL in 2004. With e-filing and IRS partnerships that help consumers e-file for free, U.S. taxpayers can generally receive their tax refunds within three weeks and sometimes as quickly as ten to fourteen days if they choose to receive their refund via direct deposit. As of 2017, 70% of US taxpayers have access to free e-file and tax preparation services. This rendered RALs less attractive to some.

== History ==
Refund advance loans began in 1985 when Ronald Smith, an accountant in Virginia Beach, VA started the practice at his accounting firm, Action Accounting & Taxes. This service of loans-on-tax-refunds was advertised in the local area between 1985 and 1987. The refund advance loans became a success from the start and a sensation in the area in 1986 and 1987 and was the first and only firm in the United States that was offering that service according to the IRS.

In 1986 a salesman from Charlie Falk's Auto asked if they could make an arrangement where Action Accounting & Taxes could prepare taxes for customers seeking to purchase cars in order to supplement their down payments on used or new car purchases. The practice of tax refunds being used in conjunction with car financing quickly spread throughout the area and then throughout the entire United States.

John Hewitt purchased Mel Jackson's Tax Service and began to offer refund anticipation loans in 1988, building a national franchise out of the idea: Jackson Hewitt Tax Service. In 1989 H & R Block joined in, co-opting into thousands of accounting firms and tax practices across the United States and becoming a billion-dollar industry. It was reported in 1989 that H & R Block had doubled its business at over 4,000 locations due to the introduction of this new refund loan service.

Refund advance loans spread to Canada through Liberty Tax Service and in time this company also moved into the United States market offering the same service. The proliferation of this tax loan practice coincided with the introduction of electronic filing by the IRS. Previous to this time refunds would take on average two to three months to come back from the IRS which is why loans on tax refund are also known as refund anticipation loans.

In 1988, Ronald Smith as well as Mr. Coplon were jointly sued by the Attorney General of Virginia in a Richmond state court for charging usurious interest. Ronald Smith was eventually dismissed from the case and it was reported by the State's Attorney at the time that the reason for his dismissal from the case was that Mr. Smith was "not culpable".

A tax preparer would, within 24 hours of submission, receive from the IRS confirmation that the submission was free of mathematical errors, and that the filer had no liens or delinquent federal student loans. This meant that there was a good chance that the IRS would pay the refund within weeks, barring fraudulent income reporting. At that point the preparer would issue the filer a check for the amount of the expected refund minus a commission. In 1995, The New York Times reported that Beneficial's $30 electronic filing fee and $59 loan fee amounted to a 250 percent APR on a refund of $1,000.

Exploitation of the system had begun by the early 1990s; filers misreported their income to inflate their refund. As a result of this, and also to discourage filers from this rather uneconomical offer, in 1994 the IRS stopped providing tax preparers with a confirmation that a deposit would take place for a certain amount and that it would begin sending refunds directly to taxpayers instead of banks that made the loan, but not having the desired effects, the confirmations were re-instated the following year.

== Controversy ==
According to the Consumer Federation of America and the National Consumer Law Center, RALs are controversial because, like payday loans and title loans, RALs are high-profit, low-risk loans marketed toward the working poor. A 2006 study by the NCLC and the Consumer Federation of America found that "Based upon the prices for RALs in 2006, a consumer can expect to pay about $100 in order to get a RAL for the average refund of about $2,150 from a commercial tax preparation chain this year".

Opponents of RALs, like the National Consumer Law Center, argue that the profit motive of the lender results in RALs being issued too often to low-income individuals who are made to believe the wait for their refund is longer than it really is, who do not realize they are taking a loan, do not understand the high interest rates charged by the loan (often exceeding 100% APR until the last two tax filing seasons), and who do not actually need the funds immediately.

== Third-party cross-collection of bank debt ("previous debt") for both RALs and RACs ==
As part of applying for both financial products, the client is directing his or her refund to the account-issuing bank. Cross-collection occurs in cases where the bank uses this occasion to collect debt owed another bank. As the IRS Taxpayer Advocate described the practice in 2006: "if a taxpayer owes money on a defaulted RAL to Bank A and subsequently attempts to buy another RAL from Bank B, Bank B is authorized to collect the outstanding debt from the RAL proceeds, transmit the funds to Bank A". It is somewhat unclear how broad the type of debt is for which banks cross-collect. This practice is often not adequately disclosed to the tax preparation client. As a lawsuit filing against H&R Block by the California Attorney General in February 2006 stated, "H&R Block does not adequately tell such customers about any alleged debts, or that when they sign the new RAL application, they agree to automatic debt collection—including collection on alleged RAL-related debts from other tax preparers or banks. These applications are denied, and the customer's anticipated refund is used to pay off the debt, plus a fee". Tax prep firms often vaguely refer to this practice merely as "previous debt".

This risk exists even if the client is only using the RAC account for purposes of taking the tax preparation fees out of the refund.

== Jan. 2011: IRS will not be providing "debt indicator" ==
On August 5, 2010, the IRS announced that for the upcoming 2011 tax filing season, the agency would no longer be providing preparers and associated financial institutions with the "debt indicator" (a one-letter code that discloses whether or not the taxpayer owes back taxes and whether or not the taxpayer owes federally collected obligations such as child support, student loans, etc.).

Taxpayers themselves will continue to have access to information about their refund through the "Where's My Refund?" feature at the irs.gov website.

In the same news release, the IRS stated it was exploring ways to allow filers to directly split off part of the refund to pay for professional tax preparation, possibly starting in January 2012. The IRS is asking for input from filers, consumer advocates, and those in the tax preparation community regarding whether this would be cost-effective.

== Jan. 2013: Major U.S. banks stop offering RALs ==
Beginning with the 2013 tax season, major U.S. banks will no longer be offering RALs. They will instead be offering similar financial products of RACs, which are not loans but are rather temporary accounts which sit empty waiting for the client's IRS refund.

== See also ==
- Payday loan, another type of low-principal, high-interest short-term loan
- Alternative financial services

== Articles ==
- "Tax Refund Loans Are Revamped and Resurrected". The New York Times, Jan. 15, 2017
- "Why Refund Anticipation Loans Are (Still) Bad News", Credit.org.
- http://www.usatoday.com/money/perfi/general/2006-09-17-refund-loans-usat_x.htm
- "E-filing can make high-fee loans unnecessary", MSNBC, 2006-02-15
