= TaxAct =

American tax preparation company

TaxAct Holdings, Inc.
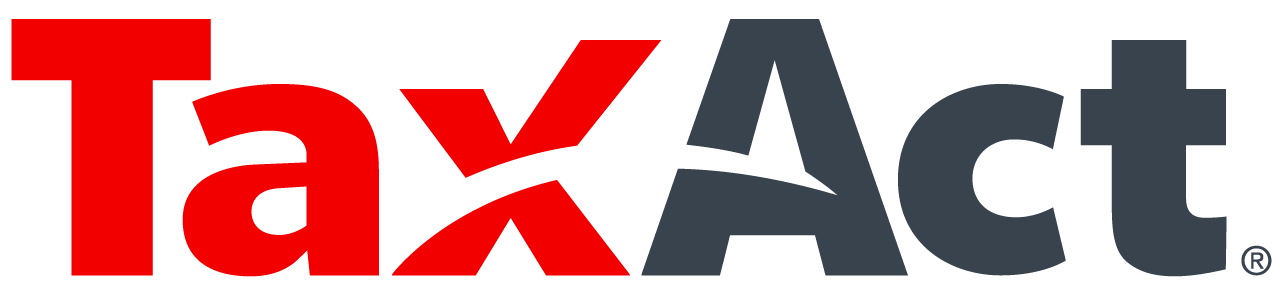
- Formerly: 2nd Story Software (1998-2013)
- Company type: Private
- Industry: Software
- Founded: 1998; 28 years ago in Cedar Rapids, Iowa, United States
- Founders: Lance Dunn; Cammie Greif; Jerry McConnell; Alan Sperfslage
- Area served: United States, Canada
- Key people: Curtis Campbell (President)
- Owner: Cinven
- Number of employees: 300 (2021)
- Website: taxact.com

TaxAct Holdings, Inc. is an American tax preparation software company based in Cedar Rapids, Iowa. The company offers its own software package "TaxAct" to individual tax registers, companies and professional affiliates. The company was founded in 1998.

== History ==
TaxAct Holdings, Inc. was founded in 1998 as 2nd Story Software by Lance Dunn, Jerry McConnell, Cammie Greif, and Alan Sperfslage.

In 2000, a cloud-based version of TaxAct software was released. In 2004, TA Associates, a private equity firm based in Boston, acquired two-thirds of the company for $89 million.

In October 2010, H&R Block said it would pay $287.5 million in cash to acquire the parent firm of TaxAct. In May 2011 the U.S. Department of Justice attempted to stop the acquisition in an antitrust lawsuit. In November 2011, a federal judge sided with the Justice Department, and both companies mutually terminated the contract.

In January 2012, 2nd Story Software was sold to Seattle-based Blucora (formerly Infospace, Inc.) for more than $287 million. In 2013, the name was officially changed to TaxAct Holdings, Inc. Subsequently, in October of the same year, TaxAct acquired Balance Financial, the company that specializes in personal finance tools and services.

In 2018, former Intuit executive Curtis Campbell was appointed as the President of the company. He led the company until 2023.

TaxAct is a member of the Free File Alliance, a free federal tax preparation and electronic filing program for eligible individual taxpayers developed through a partnership between the IRS and a group of private sector tax software companies.

In November 2022, private equity firm Cinven agreed to acquire TaxAct for about $720 million. Cinven announced it would combine TaxAct's business with Drake Software, which it acquired the previous year, under a single holding company.

== Product overview ==
TaxAct offers United States tax preparation software for individuals, small businesses, and tax professionals.

In March 2018 TaxAct Online Freelancer Edition was awarded the title of "The best tax software for independent contractors" by Business Insider.
