= Actionable information logistics =

Actionable information logistics is the supply of immediately available information to users necessary for them to deal with the situation at hand.

== Origin ==
Actionable Information Logistics emerges from two concepts: actionable information and information logistics. Actionable information means having the necessary information immediately available in order to deal with the situation at hand. Information Logistics addresses the supply of information to users. Its goal is the efficient delivery of information tailored to the user’s need. Information logistics provides a number of concepts, methods, and technologies to optimize content creation along the information value chain and delivery in accordance with user needs. Within the context of companies, Information Logistics aims at the design of business processes necessary to retrieve and compose pieces of information and to present the result to the user in an understandable way. Information-on-demand services are typical features of information logistics, as they have to fulfill user needs with respect to content, location, time and quality.

== Purposes ==
Actionable information logistics addresses people-centred design of information logistics: the user actively designs, develops and monitors processes necessary for delivery and presentation of information tailored to individual user needs. In Actionable Information Logistics the user controls the value-chain of retrieval, composition, transformation and delivery of information. Features for access to information, its refinement, and meaningful enrichment are immediately understandable and controllable by the individual user, in particular the non-tech user. Regarding helpdesks, for instance, it refers to agents describing all necessary logistic processes in order to have the adequate information at hand during the conversation with the customer.

== Limits ==
Actionable Information Logistics does not address implementation and maintenance of information technology necessary for information logistics. Much in the spirit of language-action perspective (LAP), it aims on the non-tech user compositing and orchestrating information logistics processes. Composition and orchestration can be performed by the agent, for instance, using a (natural) language for enterprise specific information logistics. This language, in turn, is machine-processable and thus can be translated into application logic.

== See also ==
- Automated storage and retrieval system
- Information logistics
