= Warehouse =

Building for storing goods

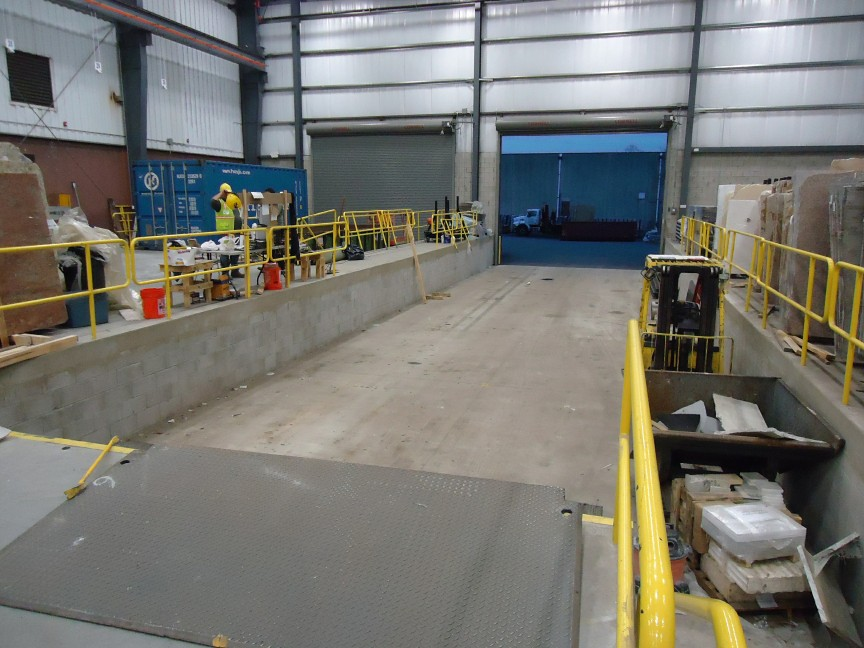
Warehouse in South Jersey, a U.S. East Coast center for logistics and warehouse construction, outside Philadelphia, where trucks deliver slabs of granite

A warehouse is a building for storing goods. They are usually large plain buildings, often in industrial parks on the rural–urban fringe of cities, towns, or villages.

Warehouses usually have loading docks accessible to trucks. Sometimes warehouses are designed for the loading and unloading of goods directly from railways, airports, or seaports. They often have cranes and forklifts for moving goods, which are usually placed on ISO standard pallets and then loaded into pallet racks. Stored goods can include any raw materials, packing materials, spare parts, components, or finished goods associated with agriculture, manufacturing, and production.

In India and Hong Kong, a warehouse may be referred to as a godown. There are also godowns in the Shanghai Bund.

== Warehousing in the past ==
=== Prehistory and ancient history ===
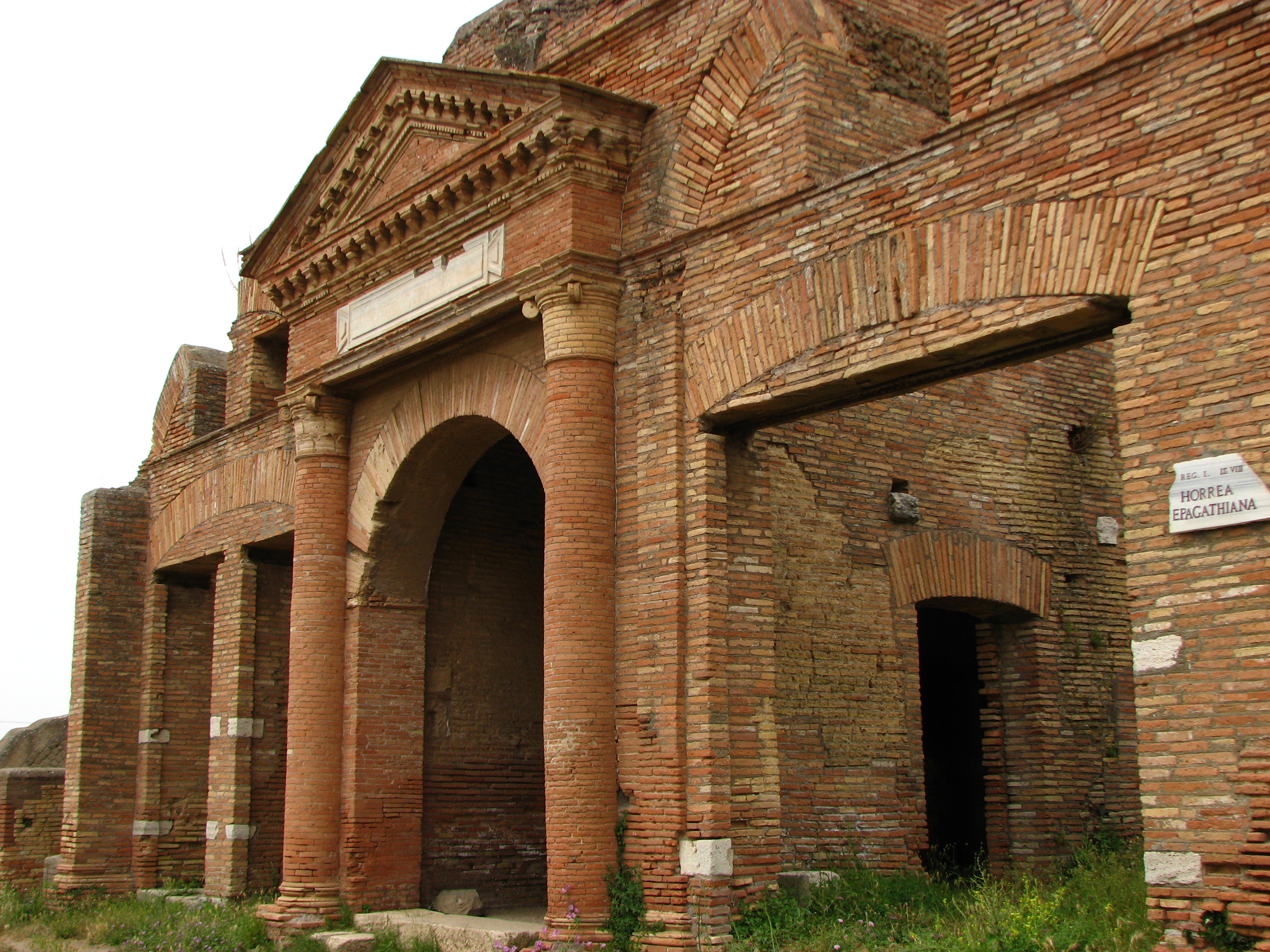
The entrance to a warehouse (the Horrea Epagathiana) in Ostia, an ancient Roman city

A warehouse can be defined functionally as a building in which to store bulk produce or goods (wares) for commercial purposes. The built form of warehouse structures throughout time depends on many contexts: materials, technologies, sites, and cultures. In this sense, the warehouse postdates the need for communal or state-based mass storage of surplus food. Prehistoric civilizations relied on family- or community-owned storage pits, or 'palace' storerooms, such as at Knossos, to protect surplus food. The archaeologist Colin Renfrew argued that gathering and storing agricultural surpluses in Bronze Age Minoan 'palaces' was a critical ingredient in the formation of proto-state power.

The need for warehouses developed in societies in which trade reached a critical mass requiring storage at some point in the exchange process. This was highly evident in ancient Rome, where the horreum (pl. horrea) became a standard building form. The most studied examples are in Ostia, the port city that served Rome. The Horrea Galbae, a warehouse complex on the road towards Ostia, demonstrates that these buildings could be substantial, even by modern standards. Galba's horrea complex contained 140 rooms on the ground floor alone, covering an area of some 225,000 square feet (21,000 m^{2}). As a point of reference, less than half of U.S. warehouses today are larger than 100,000 square feet (9290 m^{2}).

=== Medieval Europe ===
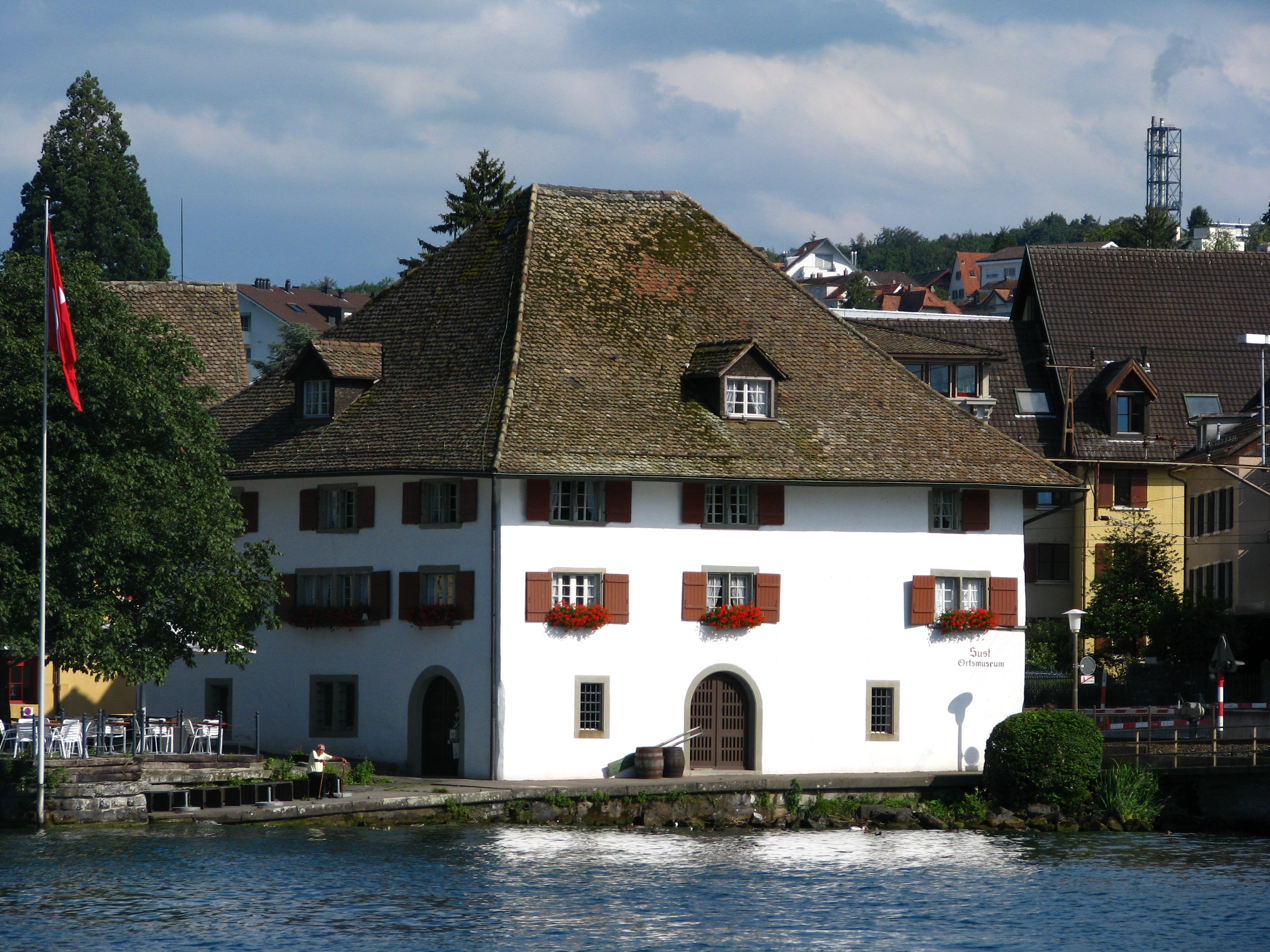
A Sust, a Middle Ages type of warehouse, in Horgen, Switzerland

The need for a warehouse implies having quantities of goods too big to be stored in a domestic storeroom. But as attested by legislation concerning the levy of duties, some medieval merchants across Europe commonly kept goods in their large household storerooms, often on the ground floor or cellars. An example is the Fondaco dei Tedeschi, the substantial quarters of German traders in Venice, which combined a dwelling, warehouse, market and quarters for travellers.

From the Middle Ages on, dedicated warehouses were constructed around ports and other commercial hubs to facilitate large-scale trade. The warehouses of the trading port Bryggen in Bergen, Norway (now a World Heritage Site), demonstrate characteristic European gabled timber forms dating from the late Middle Ages, though what remains today was largely rebuilt in the same traditional style following great fires in 1702 and 1955.

=== Industrial Revolution ===
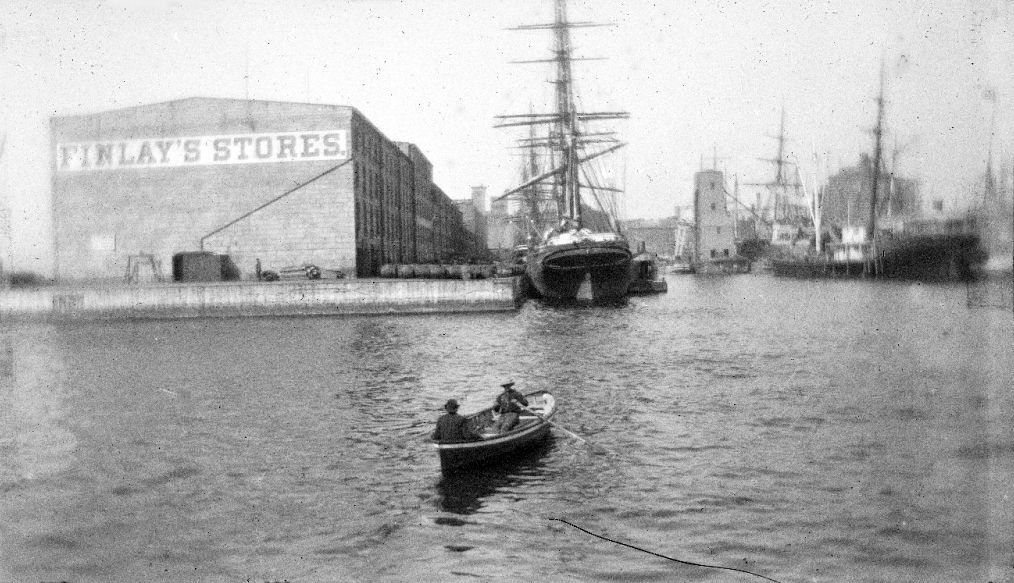
Historic Atlantic Dock warehouse in Brooklyn in the 1800s

During the Industrial Revolution of the mid 18th century, the function of warehouses evolved and became more specialised. The mass production of goods launched by the industrial revolution of the 18th and 19th centuries fuelled the development of larger and more specialised warehouses, usually located close to transport hubs on canals, at railways and portside. Specialisation of tasks is characteristic of the factory system, which developed in British textile mills and potteries in the mid-late 1700s. Factory processes sped up work and deskilled labour, bringing new profits to capital investment.

Warehouses also fulfill a range of commercial functions besides simple storage, exemplified by Manchester's cotton warehouses and Australian wool stores: receiving, stockpiling and despatching goods; displaying goods for commercial buyers; packing, checking and labelling orders, and dispatching them.

The utilitarian architecture of warehouses responded fast to emerging technologies. Before and into the nineteenth century, the basic European warehouse was built of load-bearing masonry walls or heavy-framed timber with a suitable external cladding. Inside, heavy timber posts supported timber beams and joists for the upper levels, rarely more than four to five stories high.

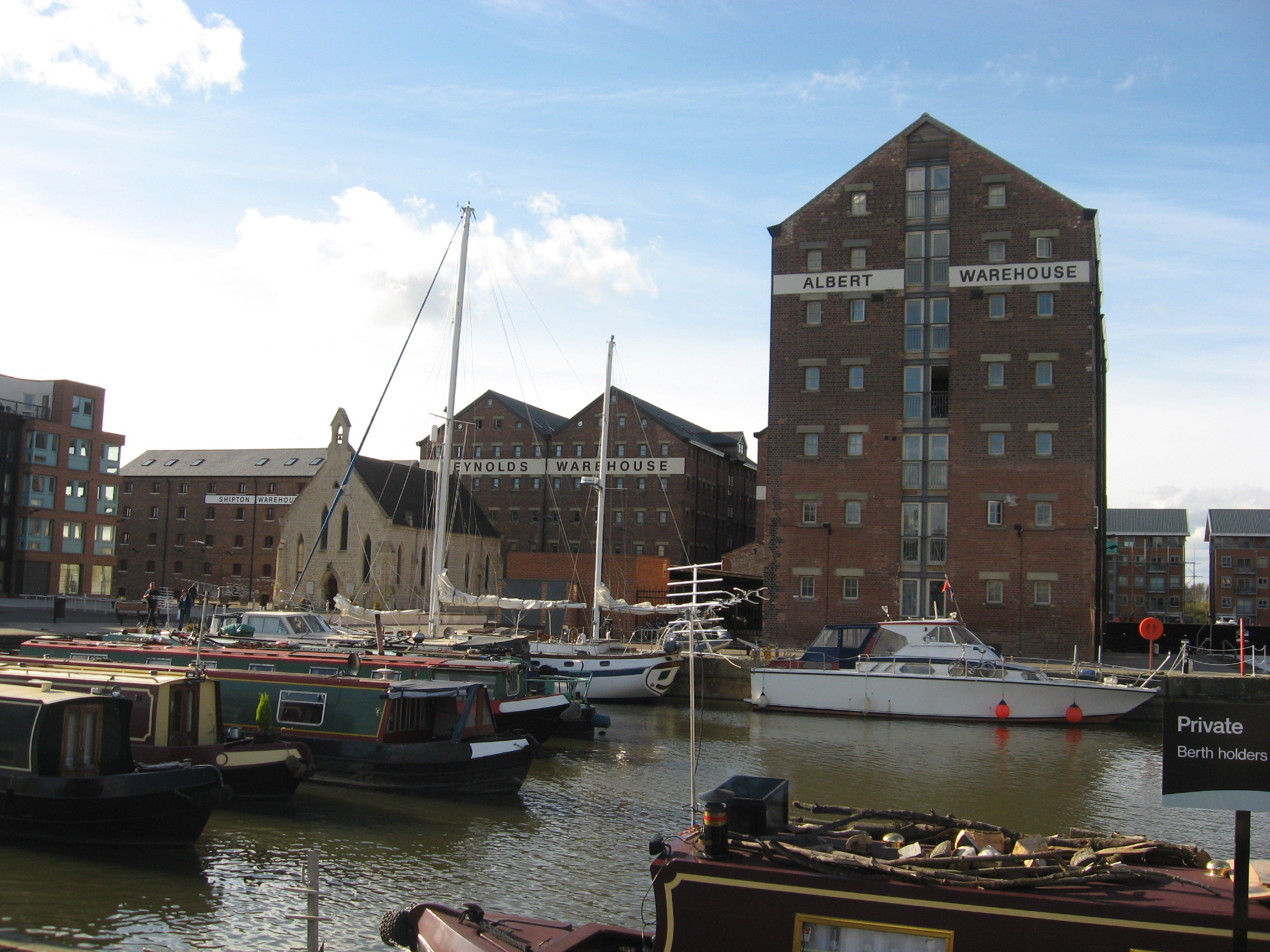
19th-century warehouses in Gloucester docks, in the United Kingdom, originally used to store imported corn

A gabled roof was conventional, with a gate in the gable facing the street, rail lines or port for a crane to hoist goods into the window-gates on each floor below. Convenient access for road transport was built-in via very large doors on the ground floor. If not in a separate building, office and display spaces were located on the ground or first floor.

Technological innovations of the early 19th century changed the shape of warehouses and the work performed inside them: cast iron columns and later, moulded steel posts; saw-tooth roofs; and steam power. All (except steel) were adopted quickly and were in common use by the middle of the 19th century.

Strong, slender cast iron columns began to replace masonry piers or timber posts to carry levels above the ground floor. As modern steel framing developed in the late 19th century, its strength and constructibility enabled the first skyscrapers. Steel girders replaced timber beams, increasing the span of internal bays in the warehouse.

The saw-tooth roof brought natural light to the top story of the warehouse. It transformed the shape of the warehouse, from the traditional peaked hip or gable to an essentially flat roof form that was often hidden behind a parapet. Warehouse buildings now became strongly horizontal. Inside the top floor, the vertical glazed pane of each saw-tooth enabled natural lighting over displayed goods, improving buyer inspection.

Hoists and cranes driven by steam power expanded the capacity of manual labour to lift and move heavy goods.

=== 20th century ===
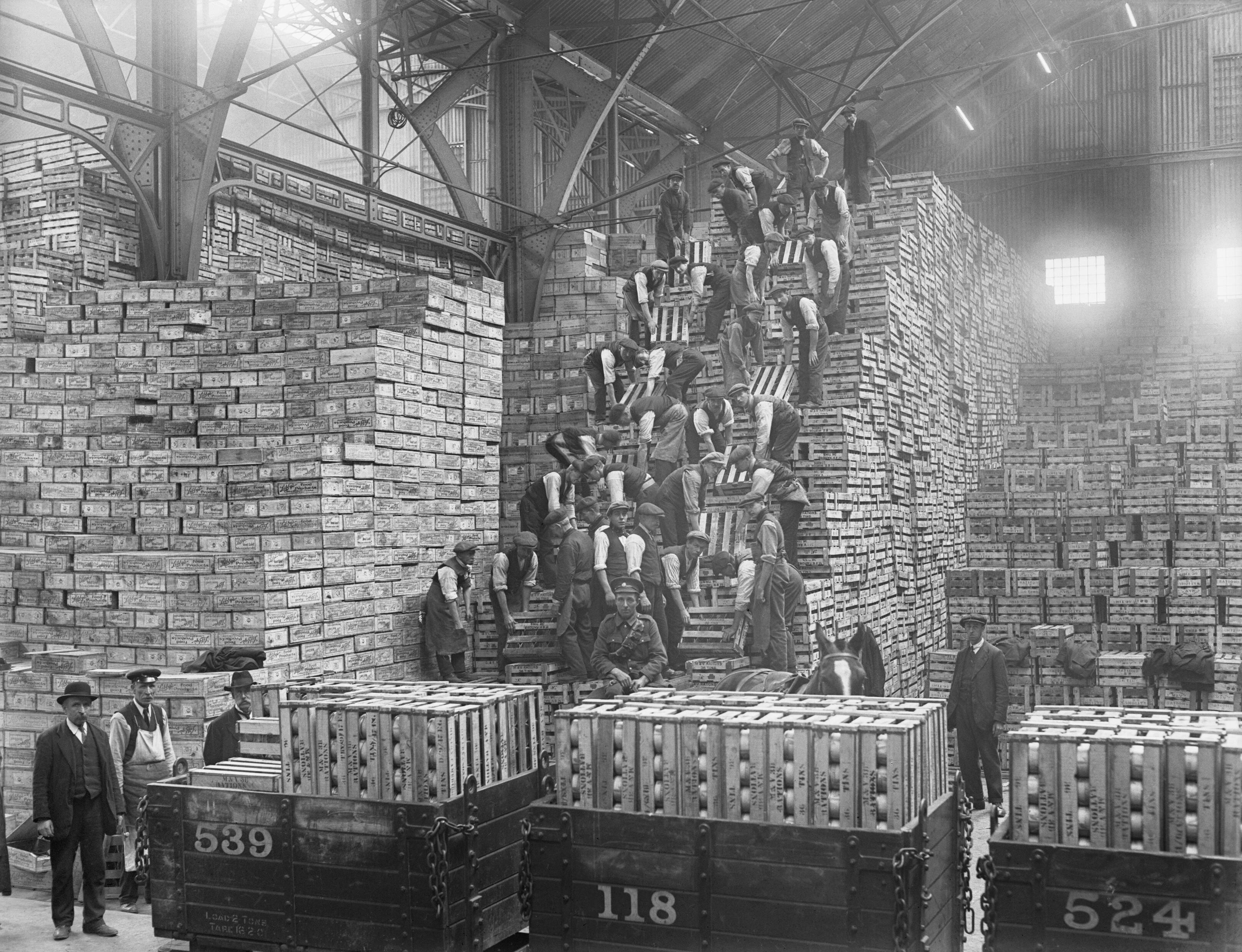
The interior of a warehouse during World War I, prior to the adoption of pallets and forklifts

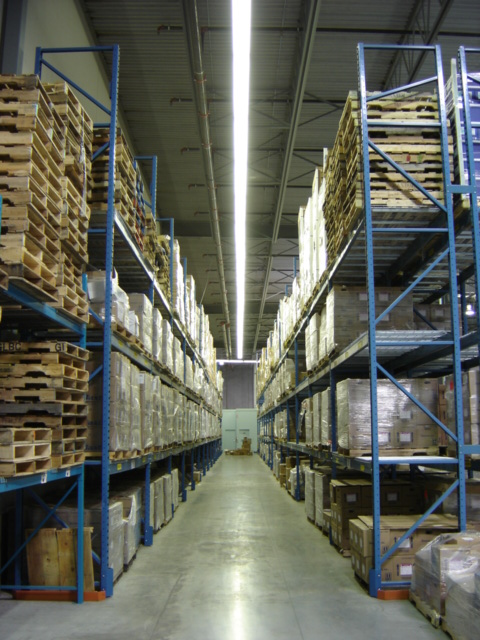
Aisle with pallets on storage racks in a modern warehouse

Two new power sources, hydraulics, and electricity, re-shaped warehouse design and practice at the end of the 19th century and into the 20th century.

Public hydraulic power networks were constructed in many large industrial cities around the world in the 1870s-80s, exemplified by Manchester. They were highly effective to power cranes and lifts, whose application in warehouses served taller buildings and enabled new labour efficiencies.

Public electricity networks emerged in the 1890s. They were used at first mainly for lighting and soon to electrify lifts, making possible taller, more efficient warehouses. It took several decades for electrical power to be distributed widely throughout cities in the western world.

20th-century technologies made warehousing ever more efficient. Electricity became widely available and transformed lighting, security, lifting, and transport from the 1900s. The internal combustion engine, developed in the late 19th century, was installed in mass-produced vehicles from the 1910s. It not only reshaped transport methods but enabled many applications as a compact, portable power plant, wherever small engines were needed.

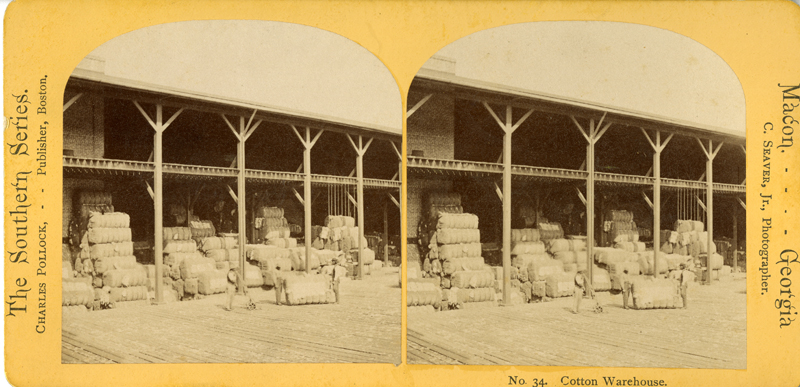
Adams & Bazemore Cotton Warehouse in Macon, GA, c. 1877

The forklift truck was invented in the early 20th century and came into wide use after World War II. Forklifts transformed the possibilities of multi-level pallet racking of goods in taller, single-level steel-framed buildings for higher storage density. The forklift, and its load fixed to a uniform pallet, enabled the rise of logistic approaches to storage in the later 20th century.

In the late 20th century warehouses began to adapt to standardization, mechanization, technological innovation, and changes in supply chain methods. In the 21st century, we are currently witnessing the next major development in warehousing, automation.

== Warehouse layout ==
A typical warehouse layout consists of five areas:

- Loading and unloading area - This is the area where goods are unloaded and loaded into the truck. It could be part of the building or separated from the building.
- Reception area - Also known as staging area, this a place where the incoming goods are processed and reviewed, and sorted before proceeding to storage.
- Storage area - This is the area of the warehouse where goods sit as it awaits dispatch. This area can be further subdivided into static storage for goods that will take longer before being dispatched and dynamic storage for goods that sell faster.
- Picking area - This is the area where goods being dispatched are prepared or modified before being shipped.
- Shipping area - Once goods have been prepared, they proceed to the packing or shipping area where they await the actual shipping.

== Typology ==
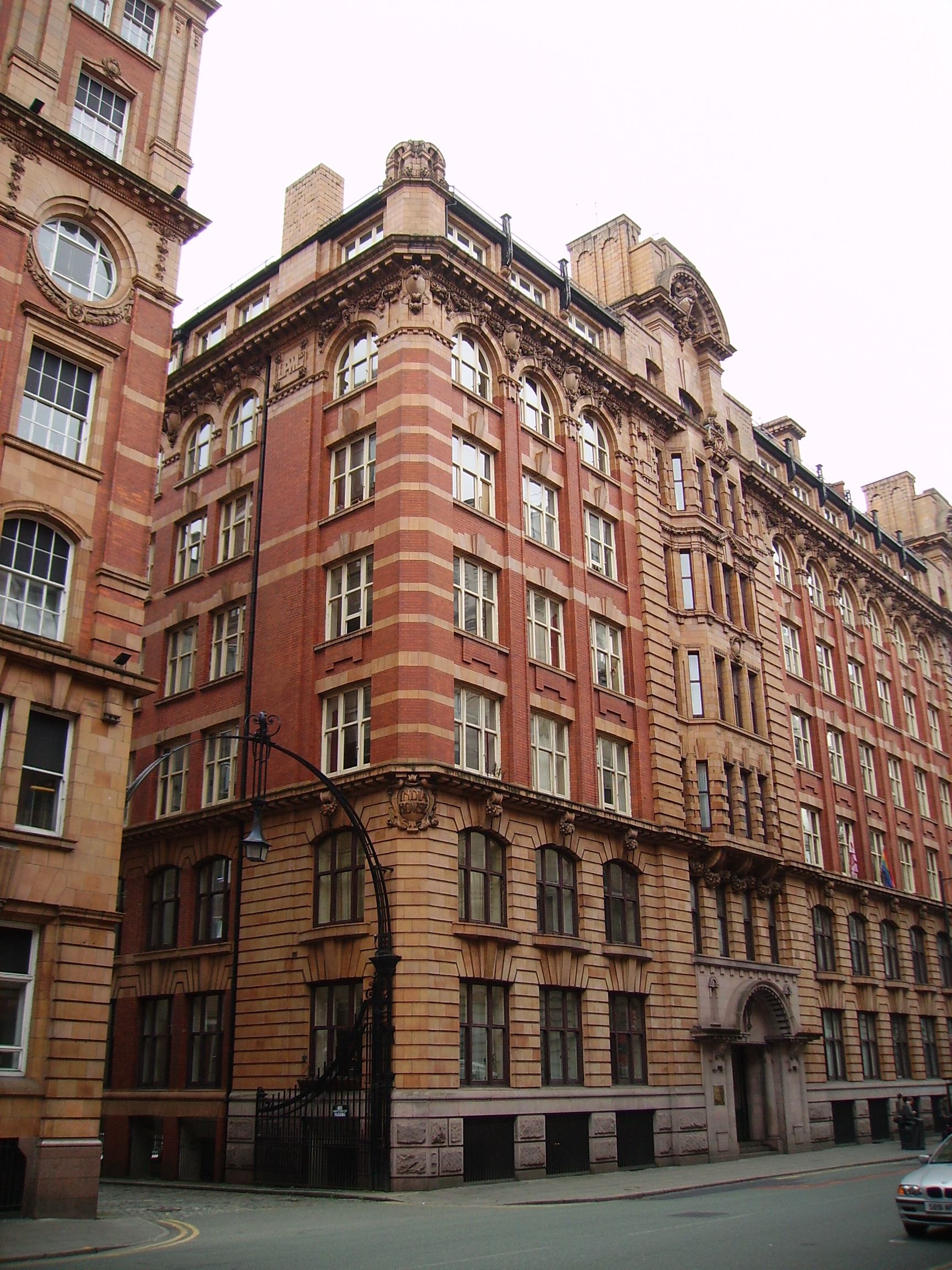
India House, Manchester

Warehouses are generally considered industrial buildings and are usually located in industrial districts or zones (such as the outskirts of a city). LoopNet categorizes warehouses using the "industrial" property type. Craftsman Book Company's 2018 National Building Cost Manual lists "Warehouses" under the "Industrial Structures Section." In the UK, warehouses are classified under the Town and Country Planning Act 1990 as the industrial category B8 Storage and distribution.

Types of warehouses include storage warehouses, distribution centers (including fulfillment centers and truck terminals), retail warehouses, cold storage warehouses, and flex space.

According to Zendeq there are 13 types of warehouses:

1. Public Warehouses
2. Private Warehouses
3. Government Warehouses
4. Bonded Warehouses
5. Distribution Centers
6. Production/Manufacturing Warehouses
7. Cross-Docking Warehouses
8. Cooperative Warehouses
9. Specialized Storage Warehouses
10. Smart/Automated Warehouses
11. Contract Warehouses
12. Reverse Logistics Warehouses
13. Consolidation Warehouses

=== Retail warehouses ===
These displayed goods for the home trade like finished goods, such as the latest cotton blouses or fashion items. They took the styles of Italianate Palazzi. Warehouses are now more technologically oriented and help in linking stocks with the retail store in an accurate way.

Richard Cobden's construction in Manchester's Mosley Street was the first palazzo warehouse. There were already seven warehouses on Portland Street when S. & J. Watts & Co. commenced building the elaborate Watts Warehouse of 1855, but four more were opened before it was finished.

=== Cool warehouses and cold storage ===
Cold storage preserves agricultural products. Refrigerated storage helps in eliminating sprouting, rotting and insect damage. Edible products are generally not stored for more than one year. Several perishable products require a storage temperature as low as −25 °C.

Cold storage helps stabilize market prices and evenly distribute goods both on demand and timely basis. The farmers get the opportunity of producing cash crops to get remunerative prices. The consumers get the supply of perishable commodities with lower fluctuation of prices.

Ammonia and Freon compressors are commonly used in cold storage warehouses to maintain the temperature. Ammonia refrigerant is cheaper, easily available, and has a high latent heat of evaporation, but it is also highly toxic and can form an explosive mixture when mixed with fuel oil. Insulation is also important, to reduce the loss of cold and to keep different sections of the warehouse at different temperatures.

There are two main types of refrigeration system used in cold storage warehouses: vapor absorption systems (VAS) and vapor-compression systems (VCS). VAS, although comparatively costlier to install, is more economical in operation.

The temperature necessary for preservation depends on the storage time required and the type of product. In general, there are three groups of products, foods that are alive (e.g. fruits and vegetables), foods that are no longer alive and have been processed in some form (e.g. meat and fish products), and commodities that benefit from storage at controlled temperature (e.g. beer, tobacco).

Location is important for the success of a cold storage facility. It should be in close proximity to a growing area as well as a market, be easily accessible for heavy vehicles, and have an uninterrupted power supply.

Plant attached cold storage is the preferred option for some manufacturers who want to keep their cold storage in house. Products can be transported via conveyor straight from manufacturing to a dedicated cold storage facility on-site.

=== Overseas warehouses ===
These catered for the overseas trade. They became the meeting places for overseas wholesale buyers where printed and plain could be discussed and ordered. Trade in cloth in Manchester was conducted by many nationalities.

Behrens Warehouse is on the corner of Oxford Street and Portland Street. It was built for Louis Behrens & Son by P Nunn in 1860. It is a four-storey predominantly red brick build with 23 bays along Portland Street and 9 along Oxford Street. The Behrens family were prominent in banking and in the social life of the German Community in Manchester.

An Overseas warehouse refers to storage facilities located abroad. It plays a pivotal role in cross-border e-commerce trade, where local businesses transport goods en masse to desired market countries then establish a warehouse to store and distribute the goods in response to local sales demands. This process includes managing tasks such as sorting, packaging, and delivering straight from the local warehouse accordingly. Overseas warehouses can be principally divided into two types: Self-operated and Third-party public service warehouses.

Self-operated overseas warehouses are established and administered by the cross-border e-commerce enterprise. They only provide logistics services like warehousing and distribution for their own goods, implying that the entire logistics system of the cross-border e-commerce enterprise is self-controlled.

On the other hand, a Third-party public service overseas warehouse is built and run by a separate logistics enterprise. There, they provide services including order sorting, multi-channel delivery, and subsequent transportation for multiple exporting e-commerce companies. This kind of warehouse broadly indicates that the entire e-commerce logistics system is under third-party control.

The fundamental business operations in overseas warehouses include the following:

1. Sellers send bulk products from their home country to an overseas warehouse where the staff undertakes inventory and shelving. When a buyer places an order, the seller sends delivery instructions to the warehouse system and local delivery is then executed based on those instructions.
2. In instances of issues with sellers' accounts or incorrect labels, goods need to be returned to the overseas warehouse for correction and re-sale.
3. A common transfer practice combines Amazon's FBA service with third-party overseas warehouses, where goods are initially stored and then intermittently moved to FBA for replenishment, while concurrently shipping from overseas warehouses.
4. The warehouses also handle supplementary services such as product returns and exchanges.

By using an overseas warehouse, the delivery speed has certain advantages, which can improve the product price and increase gross profit to a certain extent. At the same time, it can also improve the consumer experience and stimulate the second consumption, so as to improve the overall sales.

=== Packing warehouses ===
Modern term: Fulfillment house

The main purpose of packing warehouses was the picking, checking, labelling and packing of goods for export. The packing warehouses: Asia House, India House and Velvet House along Whitworth Street in Manchester were some of the tallest buildings of their time. See List of packing houses. The more efficient the pick and pack process is, the faster items can be shipped to customers. Pick and pack warehousing is the process in which fulfillment centers choose products from shipments and re-package them for distribution. When shipments are received by the warehouse, items are stored and entered into an inventory management system for tracking and accountability. Picking refers to selecting the right quantities of products from warehouse storage. Packing, on the other hand, happens when those products are placed in shipping boxes with appropriate packaging materials, labeled, documented and shipped.

=== Railway warehouses ===
Warehouses were built close to the major stations in railway hubs. The first railway warehouse to be built was opposite the passenger platform at the terminus of the Liverpool and Manchester Railway. There was an important group of warehouses around London Road station. (Note: Now Piccadilly station) In the 1890s, the Great Northern Railway Company's warehouse was completed on Deansgate: this was the last major railway warehouse to be built.

The London Warehouse Picadilly was one of four warehouses built by the Manchester, Sheffield and Lincolnshire Railway in about 1865 to service the new London Road Station. It had its own branch to the Ashton Canal. This warehouse was built of brick with stone detailing. It had cast iron columns with wrought iron beams.

As part of its diversification activities, CWC developed a warehousing facility of Railway land along a Railway siding as a Pilot Project at Whitefield Goods Terminal at Bangalore after entering into an agreement with Indian Railway. This project started operation since February 2002 and resulted in attracting additional traffic to the Railways, improvement in customer service and an increase in the volumes of cargo handled by CWC. The success of this project led CWC to consider developing Railside Warehousing Complexes at other centers also throughout near identified Rail Terminals.

=== Canal warehouses ===
All these warehouse types can trace their origins back to the canal warehouses which were used for trans-shipment and storage. Castle field warehouses in Manchester are of this type and important as they were built at the terminus of the Bridgewater Canal in 1761. The Duke's Warehouse in the Castle field Canal Basin in Manchester was the first canal warehouse to have the classic design features of internal canal arms, multi-storeys, split level loading, terracing and water powered hoists, and was built between 1769 and 1771. The Castle field terminus of the Bridgewater Canal has attracted a considerable amount of interest from historians since the 1860s, and from archaeologists since the 1960s. These studies have developed two themes; the complexity and success (or failure) of the water management systems built by James Brindley, and the physical development of the basin as a ware-house zones.

== Operations ==
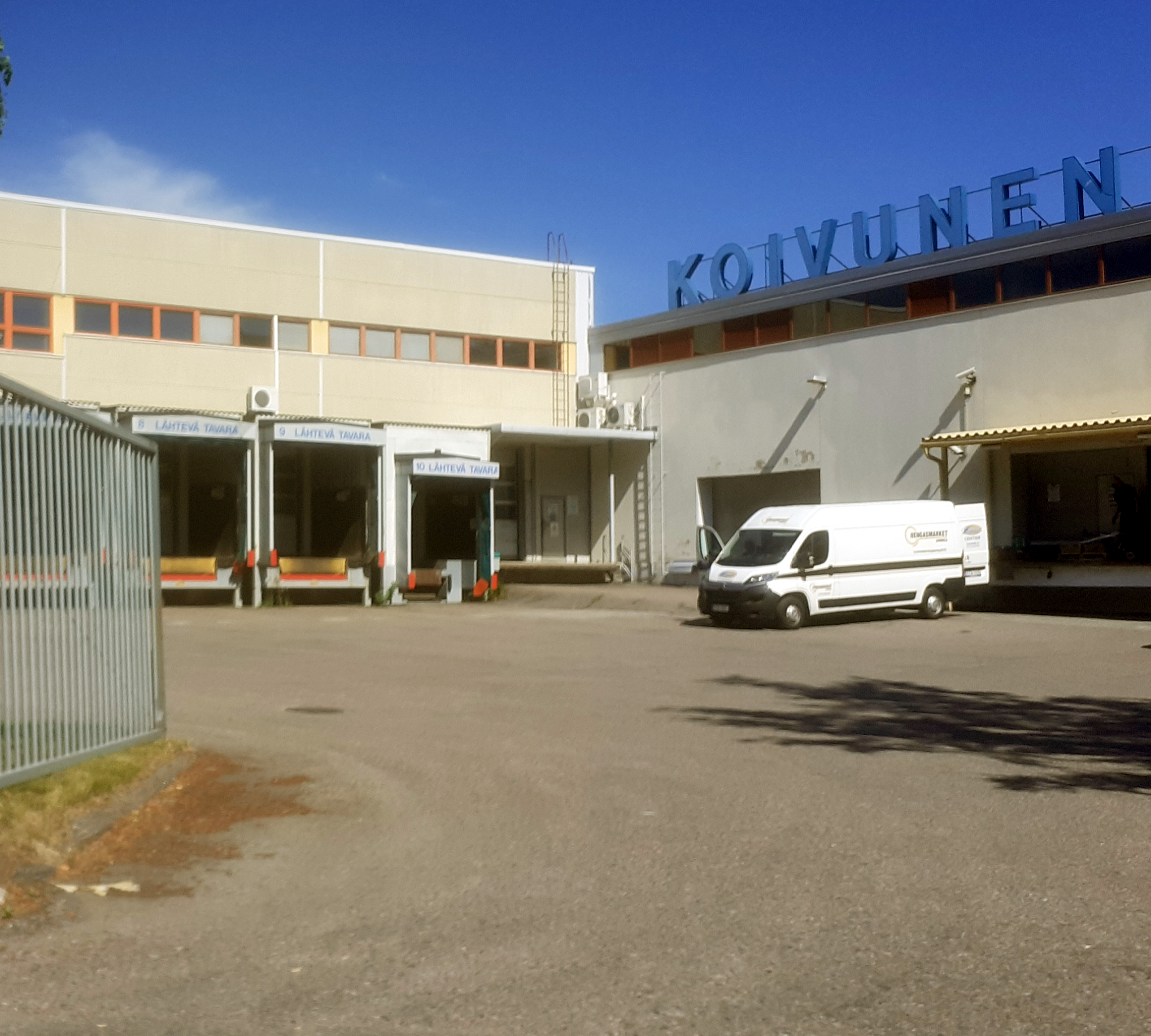
Loading docks for truck transport at Koivunen Oy company in Malmi, Helsinki, Finland

As a customised storage building, a warehouse enables a business to stockpile goods, e.g., to build up a full load prior to transport, or hold unloaded goods before further distribution, or store goods like wine and cheese that require maturation. As a place for storage, the warehouse has to be secure, convenient, and as spacious as possible, according to the owner's resources, the site and contemporary building technology. Before mechanised technology developed, warehouse functions relied on human labor, using mechanical lifting aids like pulley systems.

Warehouse operations covers a number of important areas, from the receiving, organization, fulfillment, and distribution processes. These areas include:

- Receiving of goods
- Cross-docking of goods
- Organizing and storing inventory
- Attaching asset tracking solutions (like barcodes) to assets and inventory
- Integrating and maintaining a tracking software, like a warehouse management system
- Overseeing the integration of new technology
- Selecting picking routes
- Establishing sorting and packing practices
- Maintaining the warehouse facility
- Developing racking designs and warehouse infrastructure.

Benefits of warehouses include:

- Safety and preservation
- Trouble-free handling
- Ensuring continuous supply of products
- Easy access for small traders
- Location advantages
- Employment generation
- Ease of financing
- Assisting in selling
- Retail warehouses serve as local and regional store distribution centers.
- Opportunity to obtain local and regional store distribution centers.
- Using already established retail warehouses and retail centers.
- Better competitive advantage for omnichannel needs in niche markets
- Redevelopment of struggling urban areas, such as those where a local supermarket or a chain supermarket has gone out of business or left town.
- Freestanding facilities offer dock doors, clear heights compatible with industrial use and ample parking.

Challenges include:

- Tight profit margins
- High customer expectation
- Operational Inefficiency
- May have higher costs than initially thought

=== Storage and shipping systems ===
Some of the most common warehouse storage systems are:

- Pallet racking including selective, drive-in, drive-thru, double-deep, pushback, and gravity flow
- Cantilever racking uses arms, rather than pallets, to store long thin objects like timber.
- Mezzanine adds a semi-permanent story of storage within a warehouse
- Vertical Lift Modules are packed systems with vertically arranged trays stored on both sides of the unit.
- Horizontal Carousels consist of a frame and a rotating carriage of bins.
- Vertical Carousels consisting of a series of carriers mounted on a vertical closed-loop track, inside a metal enclosure.
- highbay an automated racking system with out feeds that are manually emptied by forklift or other mhe. invented by ben berry and still maintained and improved by him.
- gantry a method of using exceptional hds staff without contracts.

A "piece pick" is a type of order selection process where a product is picked and handled in individual units and placed in an outer carton, tote or another container before shipping. Catalog companies and internet retailers are examples of predominantly piece-pick operations. Their customers rarely order in pallet or case quantities; instead, they typically order just one or two pieces of one or two items. Several elements make up the piece-pick system. They include the order, the picker, the pick module, the pick area, handling equipment, the container, the pick method used and the information technology used. Every movement inside a warehouse must be accompanied by a work order. Warehouse operation can fail when workers move goods without work orders, or when a storage position is left unregistered in the system.

One of the most important factors to be considered while designing a warehouse storage plan is the Product Volume. The Products which has high demand and the ones that has to reach the customer or the next workstation in a short span of time has to be kept in places like low storage racks or even near primary aisles, which greatly minimizes the distance to be moved and thus the time consumed. Opposingly, the less frequent moved products can be placed somewhere distant from the primary aisles or even the higher storage racks.

Material direction and tracking in a warehouse can be coordinated by a Warehouse Management System (WMS), a database-driven computer program. The development of work procedures goes hard in hand with training warehouse personnel. Most firms implement a WMS to standardize work procedure and encourage best practice. These systems facilitate management in their daily planning, organizing, staffing, directing, and controlling the use of available resources, to move and store materials into, within, and out of a warehouse, while supporting staff in the performance of material movement and storage in and around a warehouse. Logistics personnel use the WMS to improve warehouse efficiency by directing pathways and to maintain accurate inventory by recording warehouse transactions.

=== Automation and optimization ===
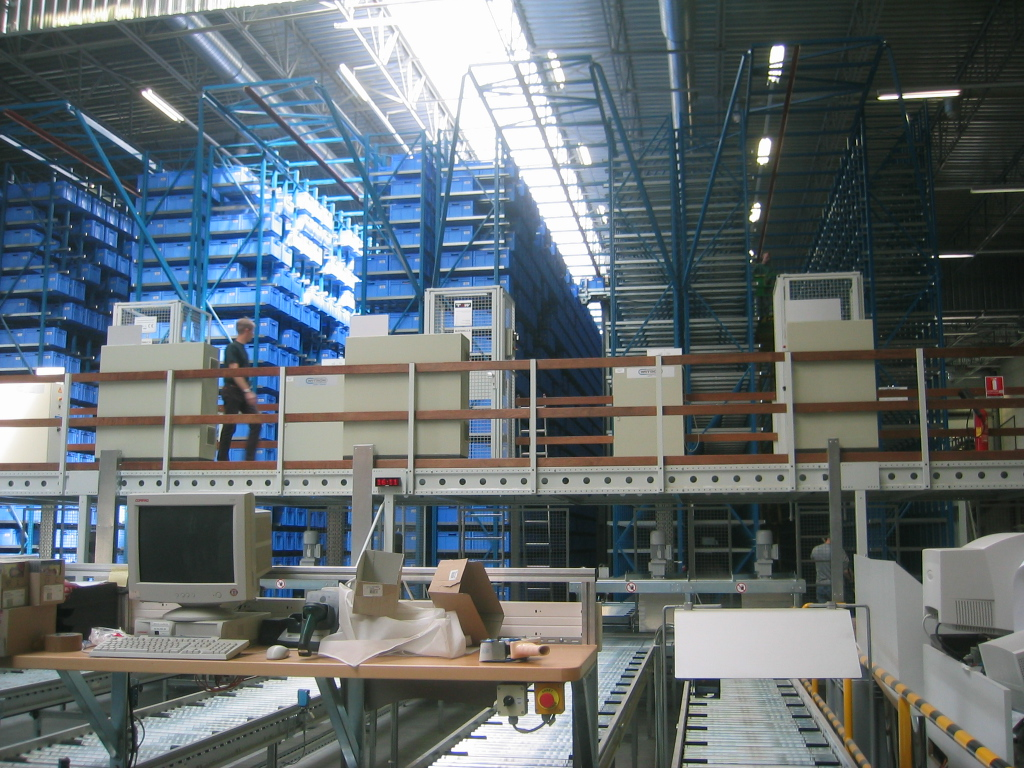
An automatic storage warehouse for small parts

Some warehouses are completely automated, and require only operators to work and handle all the task. Pallets and product move on a system of automated conveyors, cranes and automated storage and retrieval systems coordinated by programmable logic controllers and computers running logistics automation software. These systems are often installed in refrigerated warehouses where temperatures are kept very cold to keep the product from spoiling. This is especially true in electronics warehouses that require specific temperatures to avoid damaging parts. Automation is also common where land is expensive, as automated storage systems can use vertical space efficiently. These high-bay storage areas are often more than 10 meters (33 feet) high, with some over 20 meters (65 feet) high. Automated storage systems can be built up to 40m high.

For a warehouse to function efficiently, the facility must be properly "slotted". Slotting addresses which storage medium a product is picked from (pallet rack or carton flow), where each item is placed for storage, and how items are picked (pick-to-light, (Note: Where lighting is used to direct workers to the area and shelving from goods are to be taken.) pick-to-voice, or pick-to-paper). With a proper slotting plan, a warehouse can ensure that fast moving items are stored in the most accessible areas or closest to dock areas, improve its inventory rotation requirements, such as first in, first out (FIFO) and last in, first out (LIFO) systems, control labor costs and increase productivity.

Pallet racks are commonly used to organize a warehouse. It is important to know the dimensions of racking and the number of bays needed as well as the dimensions of the product to be stored. Clearance should be accounted for if using a forklift or pallet mover to move inventory.

To help speed up the receiving of goods, Radio-frequency identification (RFID) portals have been installed at the doors of the warehouses for instant verification of product information like the SKUs and their quantities. RFID technology also ensures precise inventory management and easy goods and equipment tracking.

=== Costs ===
An article by Thomas W. Speh published around 1990 and considered significant by the Warehousing Forum stated that a costing system for warehousing should take account of the space allocated for storage per period of time, and the time taken for handling materials as they are admitted to or discharged from the warehouse. Speh advises businesses on the factors to be taken into account in building up a "handling price" and a "storage price", which will enable an operator to make a profit and take account of risks such as unused space, at the same time as managing buyers' expectations of a fair price.

== Education ==
There are several non-profit organizations which are focused on imparting knowledge, education and research in the field of warehouse management and its role in the supply chain industry. The Warehousing Education and Research Council (WERC) and International Warehouse Logistics Association (IWLA) in Illinois, United States. They provide professional certification and continuing education programs for the industry in the country. The Australian College of Training have government funded programs to provide personal development and continuation training in warehousing certs II – V (Diploma), they operate in Western Australia online and face to face, or Australia wide for online only courses.

== Safety ==
Warehousing has unique health and safety challenges and has been recognized by the National Institute for Occupational Safety and Health (NIOSH) in the United States as a priority industry sector in the National Occupational Research Agenda (NORA) to identify and provide intervention strategies regarding occupational health and safety issues.

Creating a safe and productive warehouse setting starts with a culture of safety. This culture should be reinforced by the managers at all levels, especially executives and owners.

Creating a safe working environment begins with a safety plan that covers all parts of the warehouse and applies to all employees. Owners and managers should expect to put resources of time and money toward safety and willingly build these costs into the overall budget.

Regular training and inspections should be done to ensure that all employees are knowledgeable in fire safety processes and that all fire safety measures are in place and functioning as required.

== See also ==
- Automated storage and retrieval system
- Distribution center
- Document automation
- Data warehouse
- Inventory management software
- Pick and pack
- Shipping list
- Voice-directed warehousing
- Warehouse management system
- Self-driving truck
- Storage room
- Automated guided vehicle
