= Exotec =

French warehouse robotics company

- Type: Private
- Industry: Warehouse automation
- Founded: 2015
- Founders: Romain Moulin; Renaud Heitz
- Headquarters: Wasquehal, France
- Products: Autonomous robots, automated storage and retrieval system, automated warehouse management system
- Services: End-to-end integration of automated warehouse technologies
- Revenue: 340,000,000 euro (2026)
- Number of employees: 1,300 employees (2025)
- Website: www.exotec.com

Exotec is a warehouse automation company that designs and manufactures automated storage and retrieval systems powered by proprietary mobile robots, and grew into a vertical integrator of automated warehouse technologies. The company, founded in 2015, is headquartered in Wasquehal, France, with US headquarters in Atlanta. Exotec became France's 25th unicorn in 2022.

== History ==
Exotec was founded in June 2015 by French entrepreneurs Renaud Heitz and Romain Moulin to create a new generation of mobile robots to automate warehouse operations. In the first year, the company raised 340,000 euros from angel investors, and then 3.3 million euros in December 2016. The prototype version (Exo) essentially traversed large warehouses to pick items off the shelves for workers.

The company launched the first fleet of autonomous robots (Skypod) in December 2017 in a Cdiscount warehouse. In June 2018, Exotec raised a $15 million series B round of investment. In 2020, Exotec raised a 77 million euros Series C round of investment. The company opened offices in Japan and set up its US headquarters in Atlanta in 2021. It broadened its operations and developed a complete end-to-end solution to automate warehouse logistics.

In January 2022, Exotec raised 335 million dollars in a series D round led by Goldman Sachs Asset Management, raising its valuation to $2 billion, and making Exotec the 25th French unicorn and the country's first industrial unicorn.

A 2.0 version of the Skypod system was launched in 2025. In early 2026, Exotec opened its global headquarters in Wasquehal. The new site, called Imaginarium, covers approximately 25,000 square metres (270,000 sq ft). The building houses offices, research facilities and production operations that were previously spread across several sites.

== Description ==
Exotec is a warehouse automation company specialized in end-to-end robotics solutions, offering a vertical warehouse execution system (Deepsky) that fits many industries (grocery, food and beverage, apparel, healthcare, 3PLs, manufacturing). Exotec developed its proprietary autonomous robots (Skypod) with horizontal and vertical (up to 45 feet) directional systems that can move between the storage racks and fetch items.

The company is based in Wasquehal, France, with offices in the USA and Japan. Clients include Uniqlo and Renault.

== See also ==
- Automated storage and retrieval system
- Order picking
- Warehouse management system
- Logistics automation
