= Automated storage and retrieval system =

Robotic warehouse for physical objects

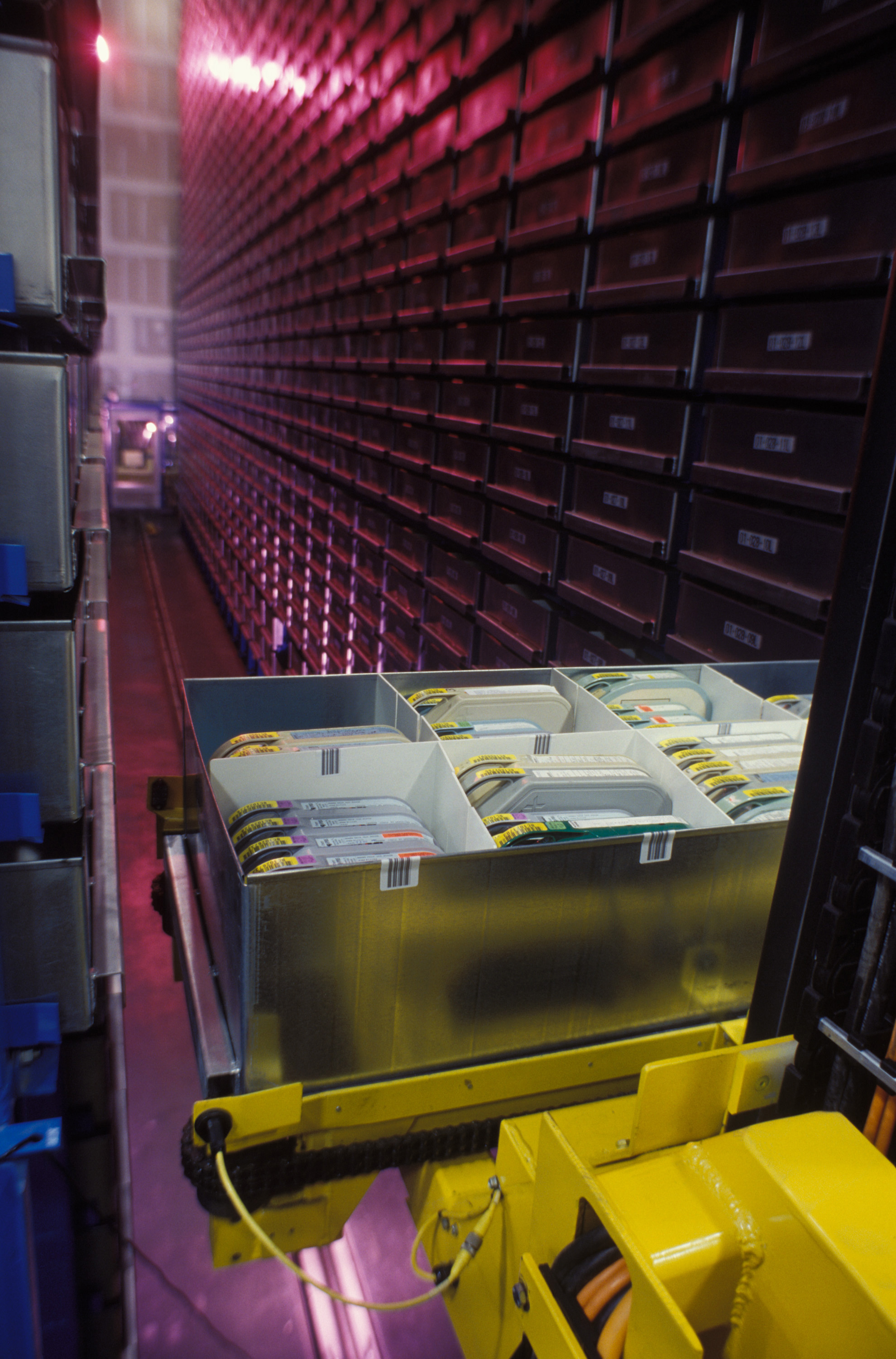
The inside of an ASRS at the Defense Visual Information Center, used for the storage of media items such as film canisters

An automated storage and retrieval system (ASRS or AS/RS) consists of a variety of computer-controlled systems for automatically placing and retrieving loads from defined storage locations. Automated storage and retrieval systems (AS/RS) are typically used in applications where:

- There is a very high volume of loads being moved into and out of storage
- Storage density is important because of space constraints
- No value is added in this process (no processing, only storage and transport)
- Accuracy is critical because of potential expensive damages to the load

An AS/RS can be used with standard loads as well as nonstandard loads, meaning that each standard load can fit in a uniformly-sized volume; for example, the film canisters in the image of the Defense Visual Information Center are each stored as part of the contents of the uniformly sized metal boxes, which are shown in the image. Standard loads simplify the handling of a request of an item. In addition, audits of the accuracy of the inventory of contents can be restricted to the contents of an individual metal box, rather than undergoing a top-to-bottom search of the entire facility, for a single item.

They can also be used in self storage places.

== Description ==
AS/RS systems are designed for automated storage and retrieval of parts and items in manufacturing, distribution, retail, wholesale and institutions. They first originated in the 1960s, initially focusing on heavy pallet loads but with the evolution of the technology the handled loads have become smaller. The systems operate under computerized control, maintaining an inventory of stored items. Retrieval of items is accomplished by specifying the item type and quantity to be retrieved. The computer determines where in the storage area the item can be retrieved from and schedules the retrieval. It directs the proper automated storage and retrieval machine (SRM) to the location where the item is stored and directs the machine to deposit the item at a location where it is to be picked up. A system of conveyors and or automated guided vehicles is sometimes part of the AS/RS system. These take loads into and out of the storage area and move them to the manufacturing floor or loading docks. To store items, the pallet or tray is placed at an input station for the system, the information for inventory is entered into a computer terminal and the AS/RS system moves the load to the storage area, determines a suitable location for the item, and stores the load. As items are stored into or retrieved from the racks, the computer updates its inventory accordingly.

Automated Storage and Retrieval System (ASRS) has become more important in the realm of warehouse management and logistics. By comparing traditional manual methods, an automated storage and retrieval system employs robotics and software to automate the storage and retrieval of goods or materials. One of the most popular material handling systems, ASRS, is utilized extensively in automated production settings and distribution centers. ASRS is characterized as a mechanized storage system that conducts the depositing and retrieval of goods under the precise control of operators, exhibiting high accuracy and swift movement. The system's performance is largely contingent on the storage configuration and the method of materials handling employed. Fundamentally, computer control is the primary controller method used by ASRS to perform out-collecting and placing tasks on specific storage locations.

The benefits of an AS/RS system include reduced labor for transporting items into and out of inventory, reduced inventory levels, more accurate tracking of inventory, and space savings. Items are often stored more densely than in systems where items are stored and retrieved manually.

== Industry categorization ==
The Material Handling Institute of America (MHIA), the non-profit trade association for the material handling world, and its members have categorised AS/RS into two primary segments: Fixed Aisle and Carousels/Vertical Lift Modules (VLMs). Both sets of technologies provide automated storage and retrieval for parts and items, but use different technologies. Each technology has its unique set of benefits and disadvantages. Fixed Aisle systems are characteristically larger systems whereas carousels and Vertical Lift Modules are used individually or grouped, but in small to medium-sized applications.

== Engineering solutions ==
Within the storage, items can be placed on trays or hang from bars, which are attached to chains/drives in order to move up and down. The equipment required for an AS/RS include a storage & retrieval machine (SRM) that is used for rapid storage and retrieval of material. SRMs are used to move loads vertically or horizontally, and can also move laterally to place objects in the correct storage location. Many companies (BrightPick, Exotec, Hai Robotics) develop robotics designed to work in the most agile manner in a warehouse environment. There is no dominating engineering model in the industry, but rather case-by-case solutions to optimize "throughput, speed, inventory availability for all orders, storage capabilities and accessibility".

=== Fixed-aisle AS/RS machine ===
A fixed-aisle AS/RS machine (stacker crane) is one of two main designs: single-masted or double masted. Most are supported on a track and ceiling guided at the top by guide rails or channels to ensure accurate vertical alignment, although some are suspended from the ceiling. The 'shuttles' that make up the system travel between fixed storage shelves to deposit or retrieve a requested load (ranging from a single book in a library system to a several ton pallet of goods in a warehouse system). The entire unit moves horizontally within an aisle, while the shuttles are able to elevate up to the necessary height to reach the load, and can extend and retract to store or retrieve loads that are several positions deep in the shelving. A semi-automated system can be achieved by utilizing only specialized shuttles within an existing rack system.

=== Shuttle technology ===
Another AS/RS technology is known as shuttle technology. In this technology the horizontal movement is made by independent shuttles each operating on one level of the rack while a lift at a fixed position within the rack is responsible for the vertical movement. By using two separate machines for these two axes the shuttle technology is able to provide higher throughput rates than stacker cranes. Storage and Retrieval Machines pick up or drop off loads to the rest of the supporting transportation system at specific stations, where inbound and outbound loads are precisely positioned for proper handling.

=== Horizontal carousels ===
Robotic Inserter/Extractor devices can be used for horizontal carousels. The robotic device is positioned in the front or rear of up to three horizontal carousels tiered high. The robot grabs the tote required in the order and often replenishes at the same time to speed up throughput. The tote(s) are then delivered to a conveyor, which routes it to a work station for picking or replenishing. On a simplistic level, horizontal carousels are also often used as "rotating shelving". With simple "fetch" command, items are brought to the operator and otherwise wasted space is eliminated.

=== Other devices ===
In addition, there are several types of Automated Storage & Retrieval Systems (AS/RS) devices called Unit-load AS/RS, Mini-load AS/RS, Mid-Load AS/RS, Vertical Lift Modules (VLMs), Horizontal Carousels and Vertical Carousels. These systems are used either as stand-alone units or in integrated workstations called pods or systems. These units are usually integrated with various types of pick to light systems and use either a microprocessor controller for basic usage or inventory management software. These systems are ideal for increasing space utilization up to 90%, productivity levels by 90%, accuracy to 99.9%+ levels and throughput up to 750 lines per hour/per operator or more depending on the configuration of the system.

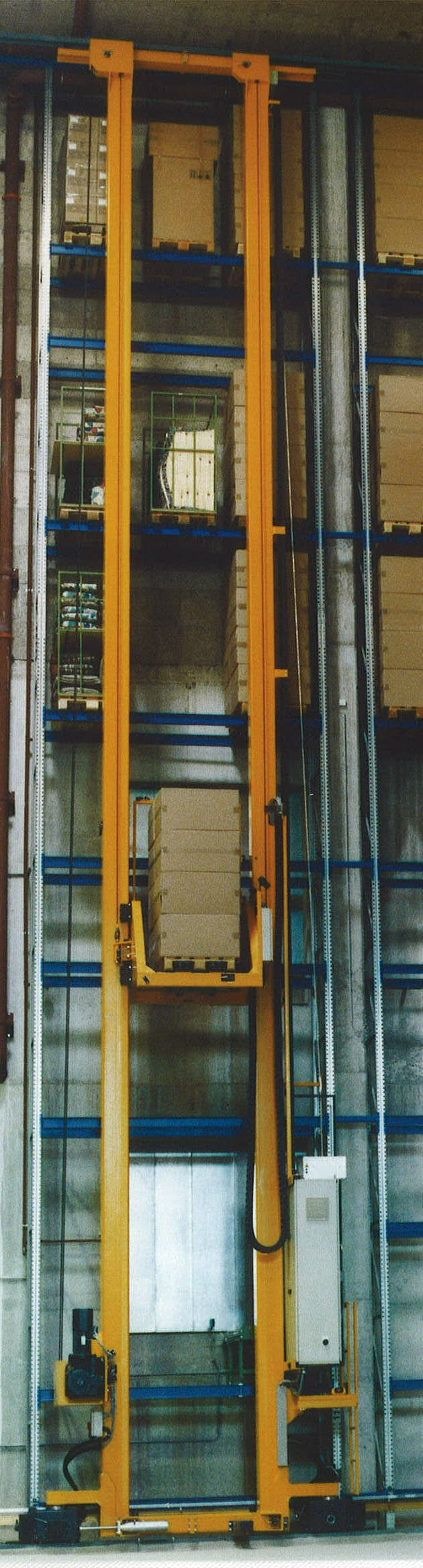
ASRS with input on ground level.

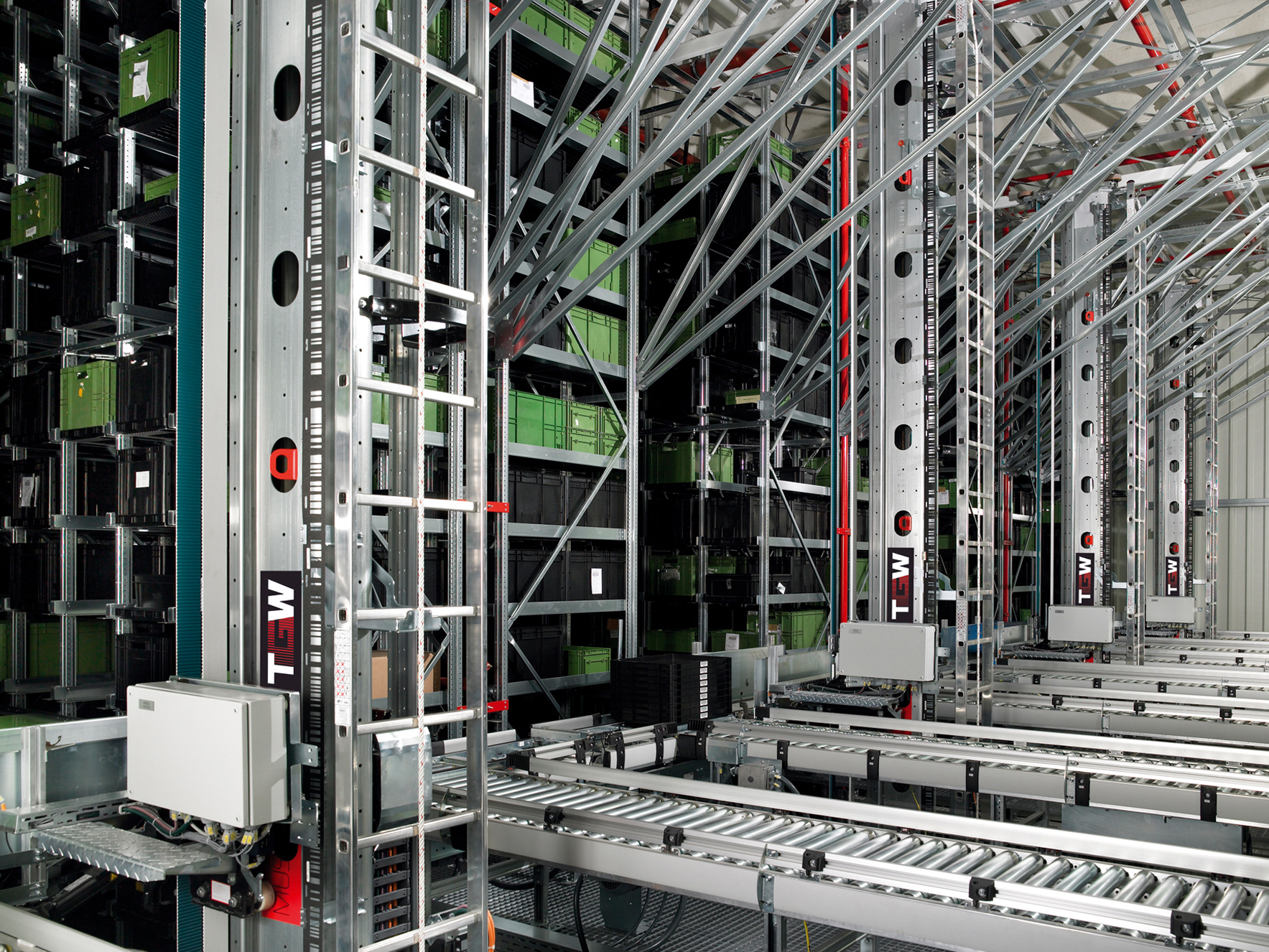
Automated 4-aisle miniload warehouse with single mast stacker cranes.

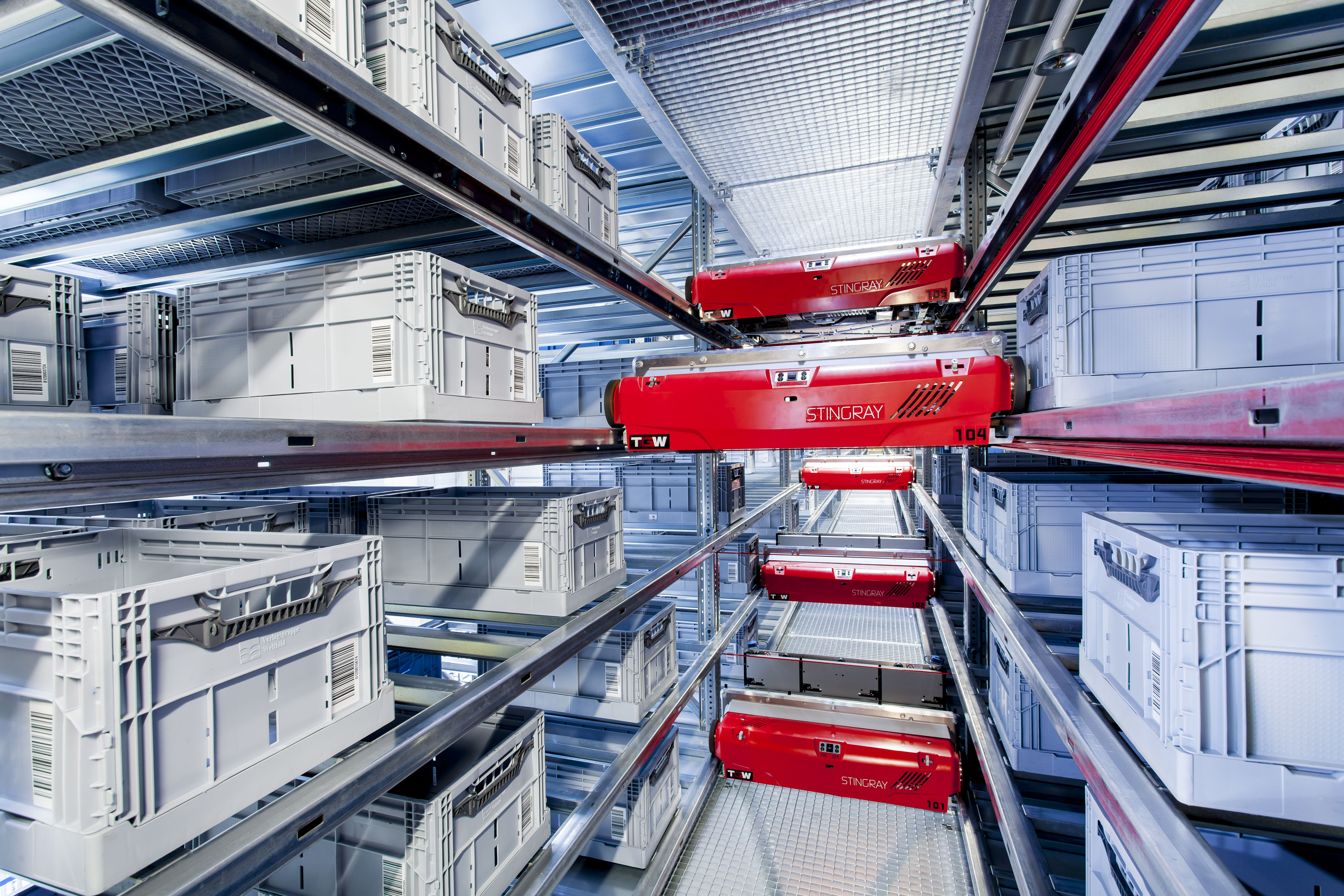
ASRS using shuttle technology.

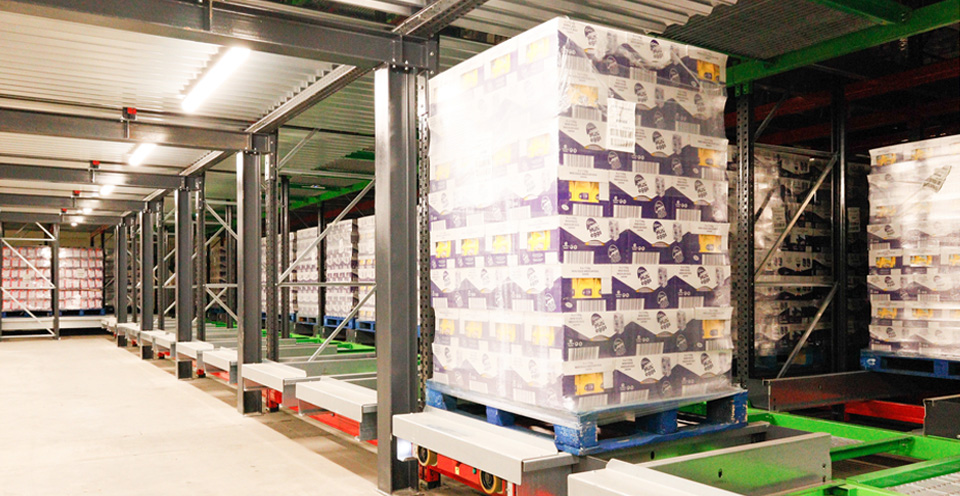
A warehouse with automated storage.

== Applications ==
Most applications of AS/RS technology have been associated with warehousing and distribution operations. An AS/RS can also be used to store raw materials and work in process in manufacturing. Three application areas can be distinguished for AS/RS:

1. Unit load storage and handling, represented by unit load AS/RS and deep-lane storage systems. Deep-lane systems are used in the food industry.
2. Order picking, involving retrieving materials in less than full unit load quantities. Minilpass, man-on board, and items retrieval systems are used for this second application area.
3. Work in process storage (WIP), often carried between operations by conveyor system, which this serve both storage and transport functions in high production environments.

Installed applications of this technology can be wide-ranging. In some libraries, such as at University of Nevada, Reno library, such a system is employed to retrieve books. Still others in use involve retrieval of bicycles from a bicycle tree, as in the case of systems in Japan.

=== Inventory Category-specific AS/RS ===
Each inventory category—raw materials, work-in-process, and finished goods—requires its own specialized Automated Storage and Retrieval System (AS/RS). Particularly for work-in-process (WIP) inventories, due to variations in manufacturing processes, the AS/RS systems are significantly different in design and function, tailored specifically to match unique handling, storage, and retrieval requirements

== List of universities using AS/RS systems ==
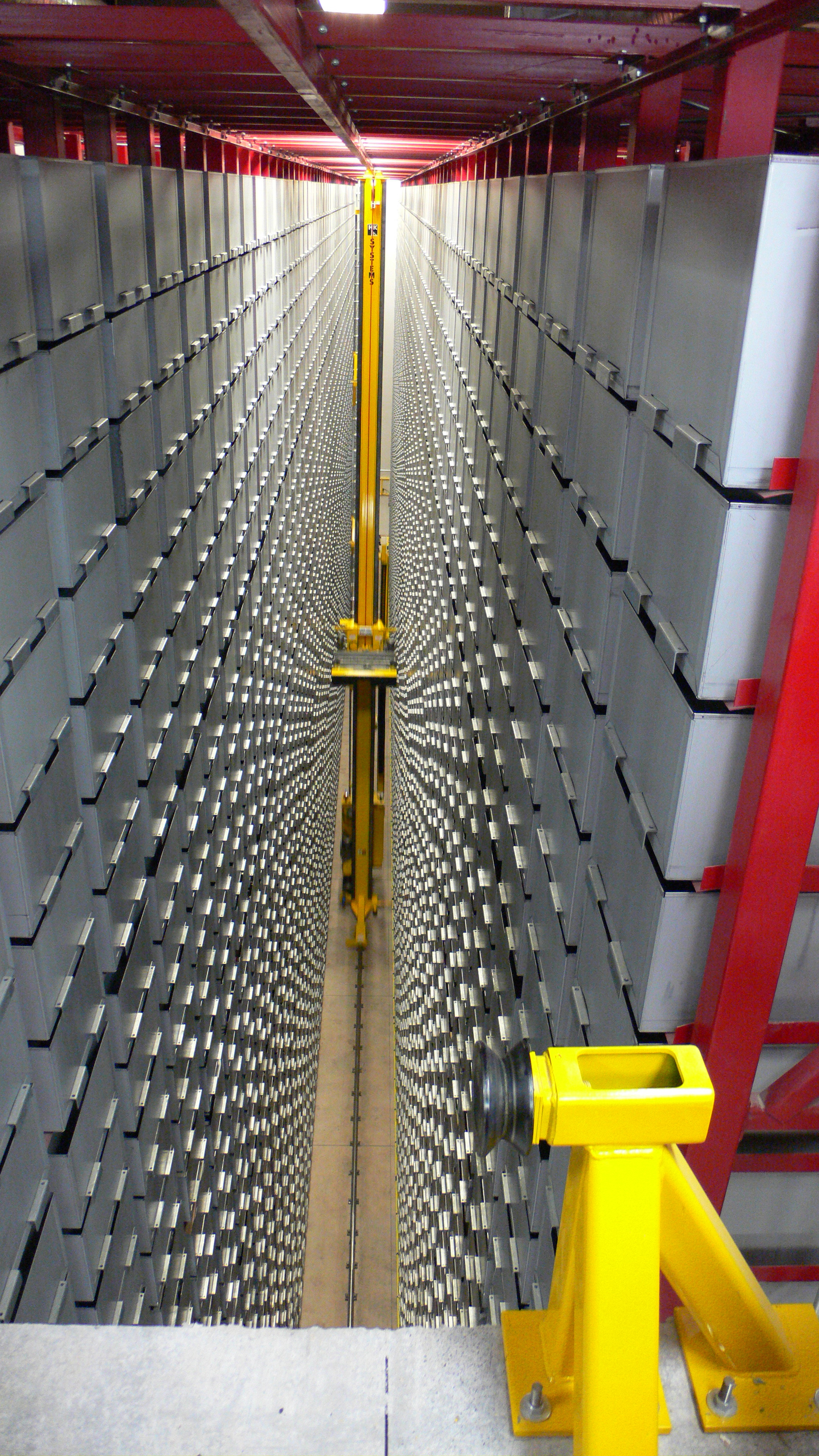
Robot book fetcher at the University of Utah.

Some examples of academic institutions using automated storage and retrieval systems are:

- University of British Columbia, Vancouver, British Columbia
- California State University, Long Beach, Long Beach, California
- California State University, Northridge, Northridge, California
- University of Central Florida, Orlando, Florida
- Chicago State University, Chicago, Illinois
- University of Chicago, Chicago, Illinois
- Colgate University, Hamilton, New York
- Cornell University, Ithaca, New York
- Defense Visual Information Center, March Air Reserve Base, Riverside County, California
- Eastern Michigan University, Ypsilanti, Michigan
- Georgia Southern University, Statesboro, Georgia
- Grand Valley State University, Grand Rapids, Michigan
- Liberty University, Lynchburg, Virginia
- University of Limerick, Limerick (Ireland)
- University of Louisville, Louisville, Kentucky
- Macquarie University, Sydney, Australia
- Marywood University, Scranton, Pennsylvania
- University of Missouri–Kansas City, Kansas City, Missouri
- University of Nevada, Las Vegas
- University of Nevada, Reno
- UTS Library, University of Technology Sydney
- North Carolina State University, Raleigh, North Carolina
- Santa Clara University, Santa Clara, California
- Sonoma State University, Rohnert Park, California
- Tri-County Technical College, Pendleton, South Carolina
- University of Utah, Salt Lake City, Utah
- Utah State University, Logan, Utah
- Christopher Center, Valparaiso University, Valparaiso, Indiana
- Waseda University, Tokyo (Japan)

== Types ==
There are many different types and layouts of the ASRS system in the world, such as vertical carousel, horizontal carousel, vertical lift modules (VLM), vertical buffer modules (VBM), crane-based mini-load ASRS and so on. There are two main types of ASRS. The first main type of ASRS is called a unit-load ASRS crane. A unit load system is usually used in carrying heavy goods or materials whose weights are between 1000 and 5500 pounds. This kind of system performance enables the handling of pallets and complete or partial packages. Unit-load ASRS typically consists of narrow aisle racking that may be extended to heights of over 100 feet. When necessary, pallets and other items can be placed and retrieved using the crane that is attached to these racks. A unit load system is usually used in carrying heavy goods or materials. This technique is typically used in warehouses or distribution centres where pallet-level storage is scarce and retrieval times are crucial. Fixed-aisle and movable aisle cranes are the two main types of unit-loads ASRS. The primary distinction between the two is the movable aisle.

The other system is Mini-load ASRS. Based on the study by Rie Gaku In comparison to unit-load systems, this system typically handles lower loads (weights of about 80 pounds). Mini-load ASRS handles totes, trays, and cartons in addition to complete pallets and commodities. This method is typically referred to as a "tote-stacking" or "case-handling" system. This system is appropriate for operations that need to store a very large number of Stock Keeping Units (SKU). To efficiently buffer and release the products to the picking station, the mini-load ASRS system is also utilised.

In addition to the various types of ASRS systems, there are several factors that need to be considered when analyzing an ASRS system from a fire protection standpoint. The commodity being stored, the material and configuration of the vessel in which it is being stored in (plastic totes or bins, open top containers) the type of ASRS systems (top loading, side loading, mini loading, mobile racks, stacker cranes) and the energy source being utilized for the system to function, the construction material of the rack, and limited clearances within the racks (horizontally for flues or vertically for distance between in-rack sprinklers and the top of the load)

- Vertical Lift Storage Modules (VLSM) - These are also called vertical lift automated storage/retrieval systems. All of the next AS/RS types are designed around a horizontal aisle. The same principle of using a center aisle to access loads is used, except that the aisle is vertical. Vertical lift storage modules, some with heights of 10 meters or more, are capable of holding large inventories while saving valuable floor space in the factory.
- Unit load stackers - The unit load stackers is typically a large automated system designed to handle unit loads stored on pallets or in other standard containers. The system is computer controlled, and the S/R machines are automated and designed to handle the unit load containers.
- ASRS Gantry Robots - These are a type of Automated Storage/Retrieval Systems used in warehousing and logistics sectors. Some common uses for these are in the Tire Industry for stacking tire inventory. Most of these systems span 50–60 ft in width and average 200–300 feet in length. These systems use End Effectors a.k.a. End of Arm Tooling to pick and place the tire stacks from conveyors.

== Man-aboard systems ==
A man-aboard system can provide significant floorspace savings over manual or forklift operations but is not truly an AS/RS, as the operation is still manual. Storage system heights are not limited by the reach height of the order picker, as the picker rides along on the platform as it is moved vertically or horizontally to the various storage locations. Shelves or storage cabinets can be stacked as high as floor loading, weight capacity, throughput requirements, and/or ceiling heights will permit. Man-aboard storage and retrieval systems are far and away the most expensive picker-to-stock equipment alternative but are less expensive than a fully automated system. Aisle-captive storage/retrieval machines reaching heights up to 40 feet (12 m) cost around $125,000. Hence, there must be enough storage density and/or productivity improvement over cart and tote picking to justify the investment. Also, because vertical travel is slow compared to horizontal travel, typical picking rates in man-aboard operations range between 40 and 250 lines per person-hour. The range is large because there is a wide variety of operating schemes for man-aboard systems. Man-aboard systems are typically appropriate for slow-moving items where space is fairly expensive.

== Ergonomics and safety ==
Automated storage and retrieval systems (AS/RS) can enhance workplace ergonomics and safety by reducing the physical damage and repetitive tasks for workers. In healthcare and pharmaceutical warehouses, mini-load AS/RS and vertical lift modules (VLMs) are used to automatically pick and deliver them at waist height, these systems actually reduce physical harm to workers by handling the heavy lifting tasks. In automotive manufacturing, pallet-load AS/RS systems handle heavy components such as engines or transmissions, minimizing manual lifting and preventing worker back injuries. E-commerce warehouses use mini-load systems to handle very small products, bringing items directly to worker stations and reducing the same fatique problems.

Along with the continuous rapid development of e-commerce, ECL has attracted many attentions from both industries and academics. North America currently leads ASRS usage, holding ~41% of the global ASRS market, driven largely by major retailers rapidly implementing automation to address labor shortages and rising customer expectations. Asia-Pacific is the fastest-growing region with roughly 47% growth recently, led by China (over half of APAC's ASRS market), Japan, and India. Chinese manufacturers and e-commerce giants like Alibaba and JD.com are installing ASRS and AMRs to meet surging demand, while surveys show 52% of warehouse managers plan to increase robotics spending. The technology is proving valuable across diverse sectors. Retail and e-commerce represents about 29% of ASRS market share, but automotive and heavy industry also use ASRS heavily for just-in-time parts management. Even specialized applications are emerging: automated pharmacies use ASRS to track lot numbers, expiration dates, and enforce FIFO, drastically cutting dispensing errors.

== Workforce automation ==
In the second decade of the 2000s, the first robotic models appeared on the market equipped with upper and lower limbs (rather than a trolley with a mechanical arm), radar/computer vision or sensors, and capable of recognizing the products, carrying out loading and unloading operations from the truck/shelves/forklifts, positioning the load units on the shelves, handling and picking of the order.

== See also ==
- Automation
- Artificial intelligence
- Actionable information logistics
- Autonomous logistics
- Inventory management software
- Voice-directed warehousing
- Warehouse
- Automated guided vehicle
