= Wasquehal =

- Commune
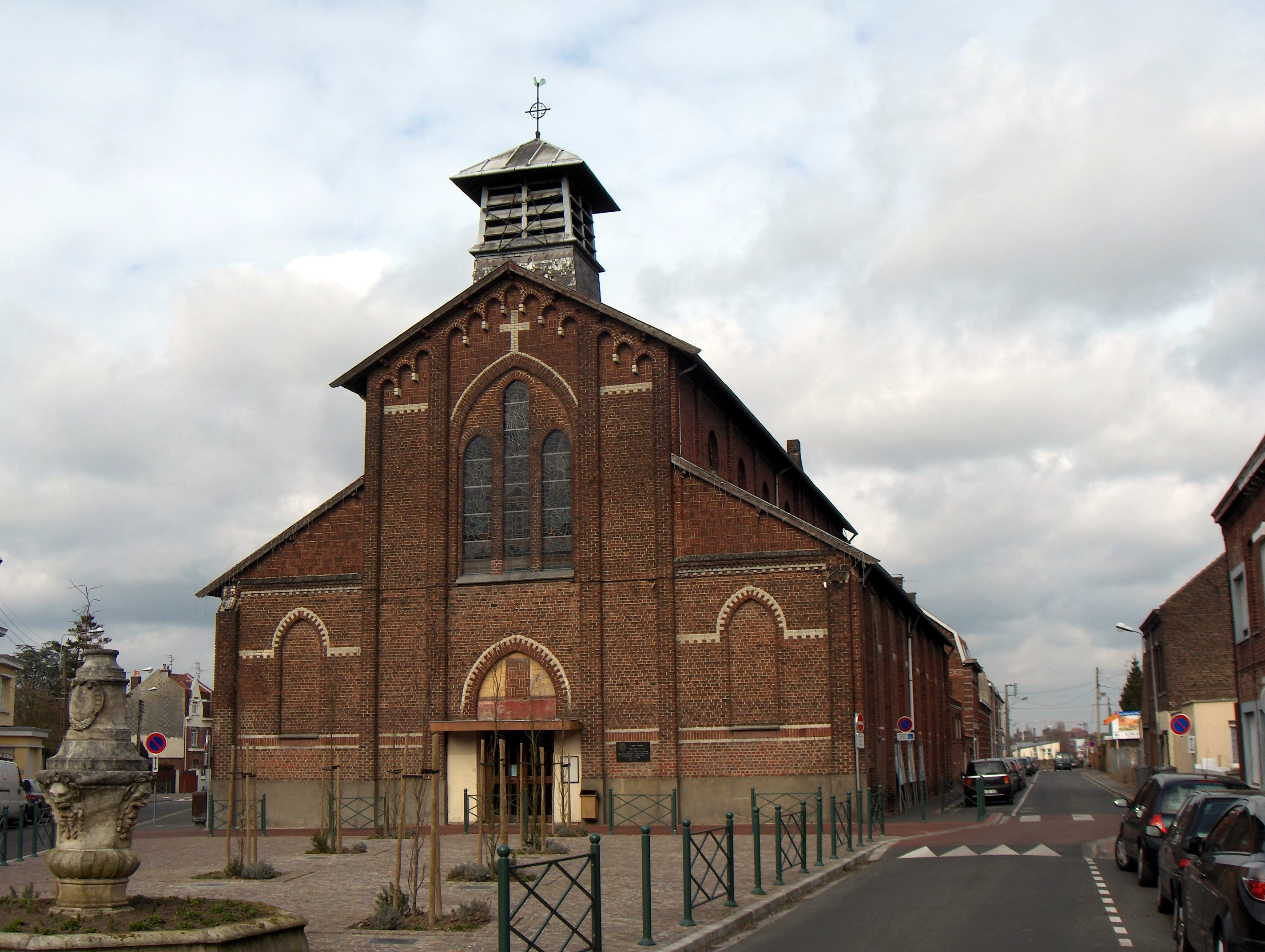
- Église Saint Clément

- Coat of arms
- Location of Wasquehal
- Location within France Location within Hauts-de-France
- Coordinates: 50°40′10″N 3°07′51″E
- Country: France
- Region: Hauts-de-France
- Department: Nord
- Arrondissement: Lille
- Canton: Croix
- Intercommunality: Métropole Européenne de Lille

Government
  - Mayor (2020–2026): Stéphanie Ducret
- Area^{1}: 6.86 km^{2} (2.65 sq mi)
- Highest elevation: 47 m (154 ft)
- Lowest elevation: 18 m (59 ft)
- Population (2023): 20,726
  - Density: 3,020/km^{2} (7,830/sq mi)
- Time zone: UTC+01:00 (CET)
  - Summer (DST): UTC+02:00 (CEST)
- INSEE/Postal code: 59646 /59290
- ^{1} French Land Register data, which excludes lakes, ponds, glaciers > 1 km^{2} (0.386 sq mi or 247 acres) and river estuaries.

Wasquehal (traditional pronunciation [wakal]; currently common pronunciation [waskal]) is a commune in the Nord department in northern France.

The town originally had a Flemish name; it was written as Waskenhal in the 11th century.

== History ==
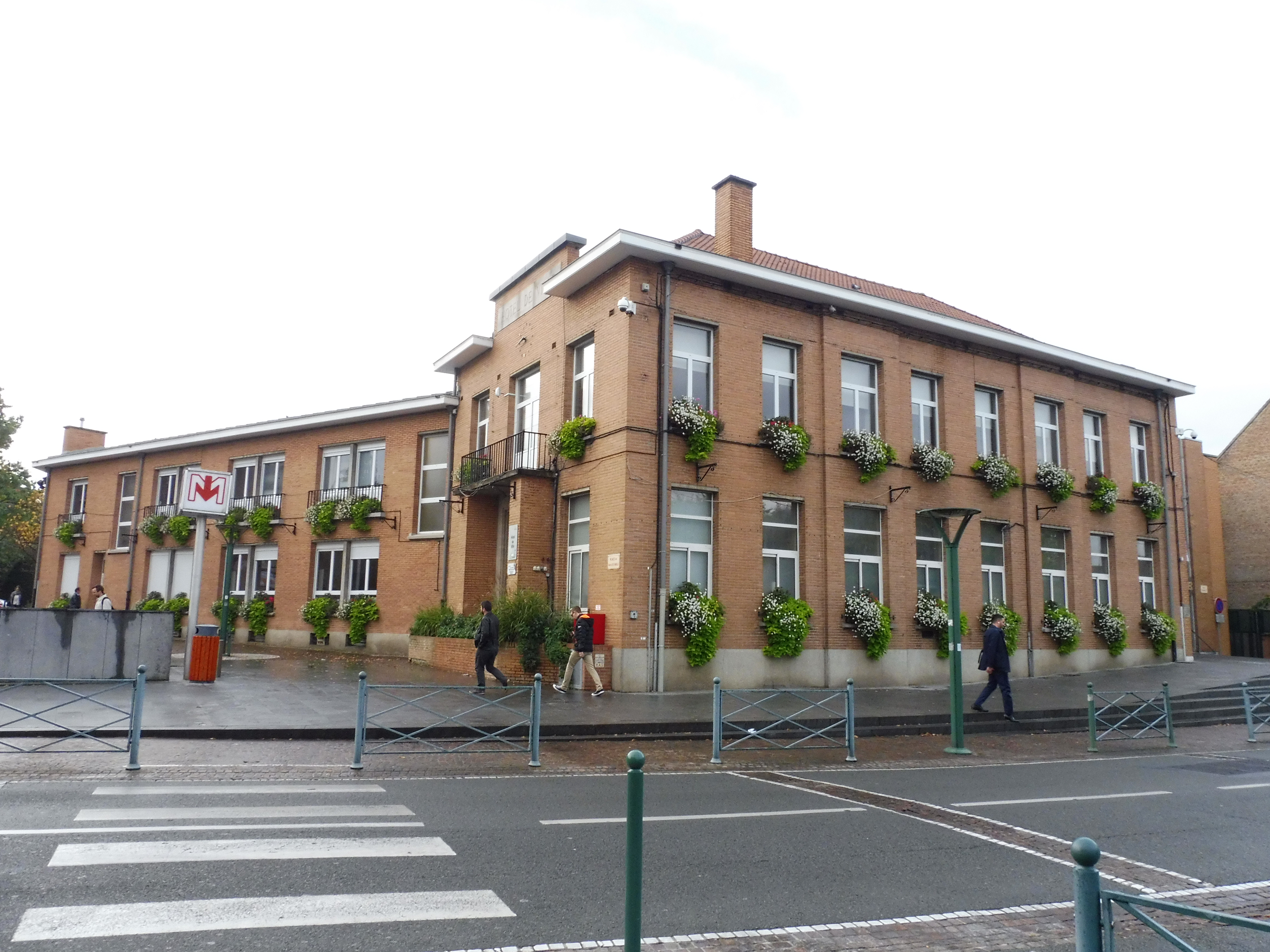
The Hôtel de Ville

The Hôtel de Ville in its original forn, facing onto Place du Général-de-Gaulle, was completed in 1867.

== Geography ==
Wasquehal has an area of 6.86 km^{2} (2.65 sq mi) and a population density of 2,702.8/km^{2}.

=== Héraldique ===
Arms of Wasquehal
| The arms of Wasquehal are blazoned : Chequy argent and gules, each argent piece charged with an ermine spot sable. or, more simply, Chequy ermine and gules. |

== Population ==
Historical population

| Year | Pop. | ±% p.a. |
|---|---|---|
| 1793 | 1,440 | — |
| 1800 | 1,262 | −1.87% |
| 1806 | 1,525 | +3.21% |
| 1821 | 1,622 | +0.41% |
| 1831 | 1,590 | −0.20% |
| 1836 | 1,672 | +1.01% |
| 1841 | 1,758 | +1.01% |
| 1846 | 2,034 | +2.96% |
| 1851 | 2,040 | +0.06% |
| 1856 | 2,200 | +1.52% |
| 1861 | 2,501 | +2.60% |
| 1866 | 2,731 | +1.78% |
| 1872 | 2,824 | +0.56% |
| 1876 | 3,061 | +2.04% |
| 1881 | 3,275 | +1.36% |
| 1886 | 3,688 | +2.40% |
| 1891 | 4,405 | +3.62% |
| 1896 | 4,901 | +2.16% |
| 1901 | 5,969 | +4.02% |

| Year | Pop. | ±% p.a. |
|---|---|---|
| 1906 | 6,703 | +2.35% |
| 1911 | 7,011 | +0.90% |
| 1921 | 7,041 | +0.04% |
| 1926 | 8,507 | +3.86% |
| 1931 | 11,707 | +6.59% |
| 1936 | 12,167 | +0.77% |
| 1946 | 11,741 | −0.36% |
| 1954 | 12,363 | +0.65% |
| 1962 | 13,634 | +1.23% |
| 1968 | 14,274 | +0.77% |
| 1975 | 16,391 | +2.00% |
| 1982 | 16,275 | −0.10% |
| 1990 | 17,986 | +1.26% |
| 1999 | 18,541 | +0.34% |
| 2007 | 18,989 | +0.30% |
| 2012 | 20,536 | +1.58% |
| 2017 | 20,479 | −0.06% |
| 2023 | 20,726 | +0.20% |

Source: EHESS and INSEE (1968-2023)

== Sport ==
Wasquehal hosted the finish of stage 4 of the 1989 Tour de France, won by Jelle Nijdam, and the finish of stage 5 the 1992 Tour de France, won by Guido Bontempi. The third stage of the 2004 Tour de France also finished in Wasquehal. Jean-Patrick Nazon won the mass sprint ahead of Erik Zabel and Robbie McEwen. Wasquehal also hosted the start of stage 7 of the 1988 Tour de France, and the start of stage 3 of the 1996 Tour de France.

The city's football team is the Wasquehal FC. It went bankrupt and disappeared in June 2026.

The city acquired its municipal ice rink (patinoire Serge-Charles) from Albertville's Olympic Committee and inaugurated it in 1995.

== Economy ==
International robotics manufacturer Exotec inaugurated its new headquarters in Wasquehal in March 2026.

== Monuments ==
Wasquehal's church Saint-Clément was built in 1912. It was closed for renovation from 2016 to 2023.

== Twin towns – sister cities ==
Wasquehal is twinned with:

- Beyne-Heusay, Belgium

== See also ==
- Communes of the Nord department
