= Gravity feed =

Use of gravity to move a liquid without a pump

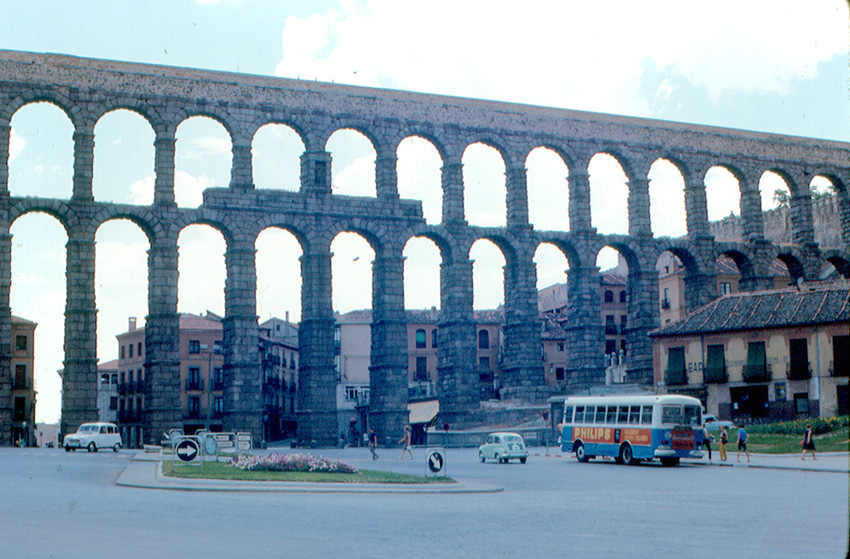
Ancient gravity feed aqueduct

Gravity feed is the use of earth's gravity to move something (usually a liquid) from one place to another. It is a simple means of moving a liquid without the use of a pump. A common application is the supply of fuel to an internal combustion engine by placing the fuel tank above the engine, e.g. in motorcycles, lawn mowers, etc. A non-liquid application is the carton flow shelving system.

Ancient Roman aqueducts were gravity-fed; as water flowed into the cities, it was used for drinking, irrigation, and to supply the public fountains and baths. Water supply systems to remote villages in developing countries are also sometimes gravity-fed. In this case, the flow of water to the village is provided by the hydraulic head, the vertical distance from the intake at the source to the outflow in the village, on which gravity acts, while it is opposed by the friction in the pipe which is determined primarily by the length and diameter of the pipe as well as by its age and the material of which it is made.

== See also ==
- Siphon
