= Logistics automation =

Application of computer software or automated machinery

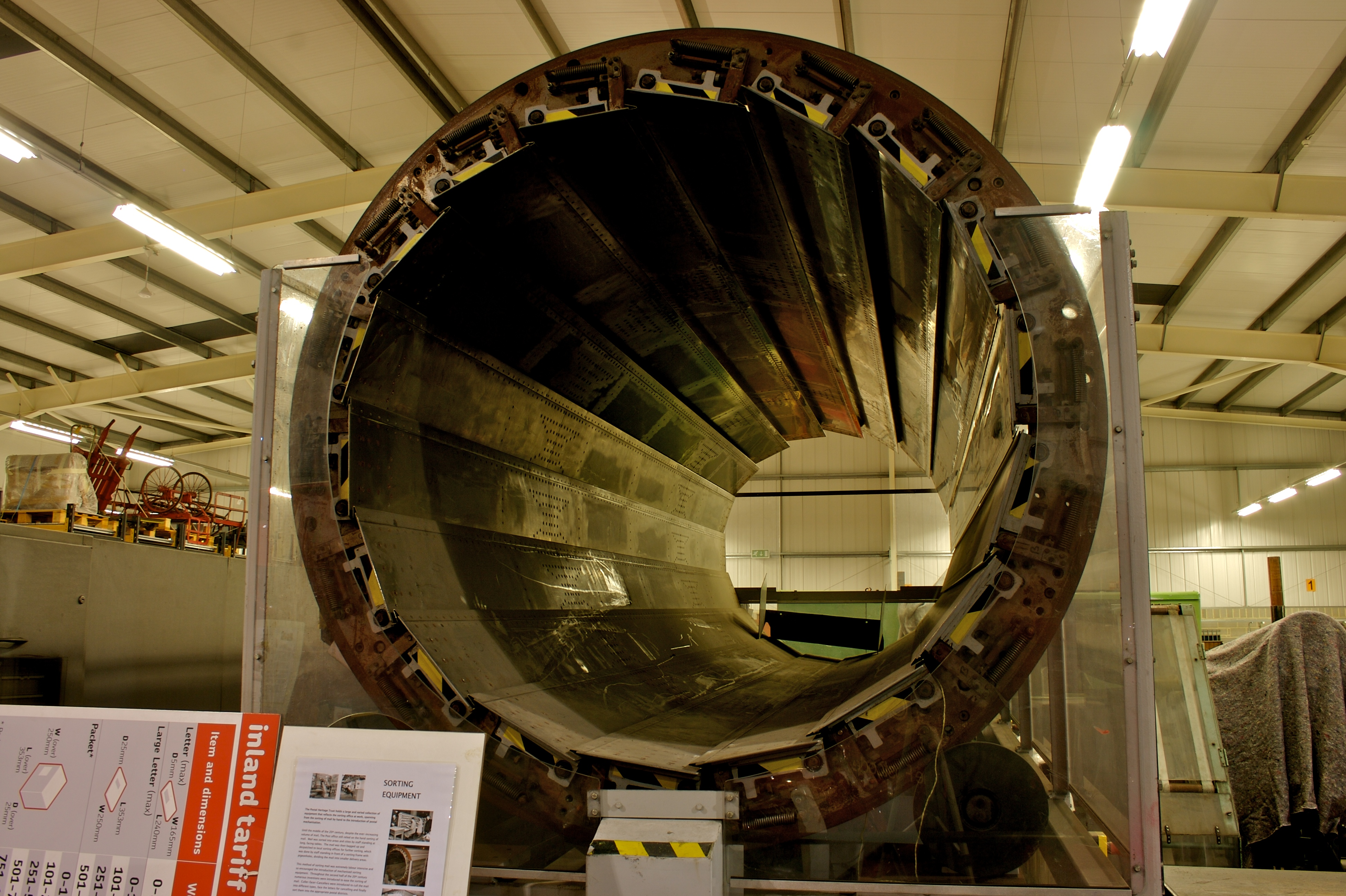
Mail rotating sorter for ordering arriving mail in a straight line

Logistics automation is the application of computer software or automated machinery to logistics operations in order to improve its efficiency. Typically this refers to operations within a warehouse or distribution center, with broader tasks undertaken by supply chain engineering systems and enterprise resource planning systems.

Logistics automation systems can powerfully complement the facilities provided by these higher level computer systems. The focus on an individual node within a wider logistics network allows systems to be highly tailored to the requirements of that node.

== Components ==
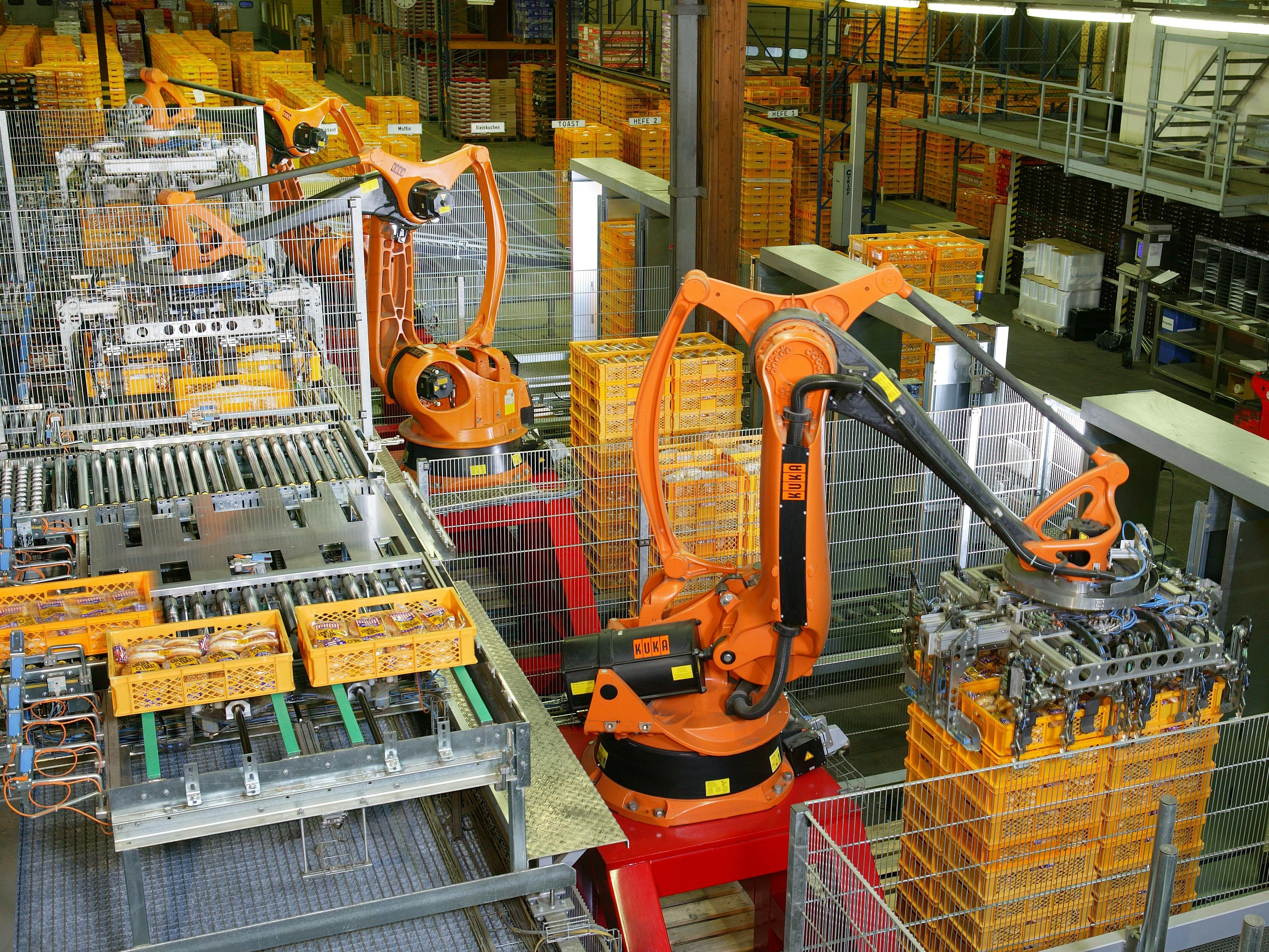
Factory automation with KUKA industrial robots for palletizing food products like bread and toast at a bakery in Germany

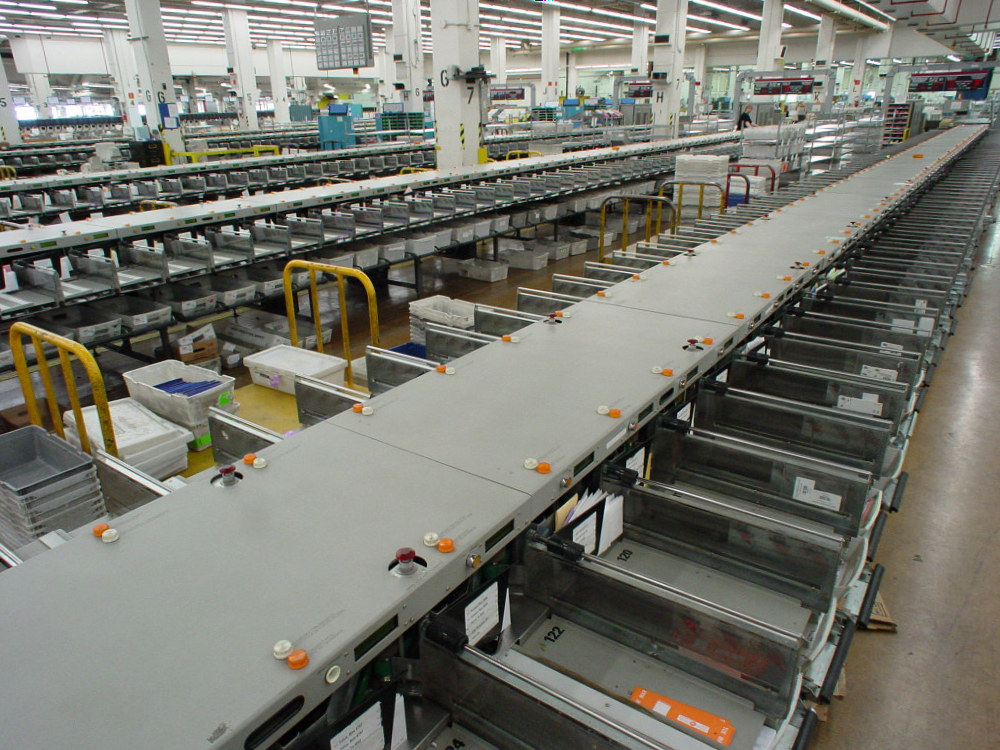
Mail sorting line: mail is identified through bar-code scanning and automatically sorted by destination.

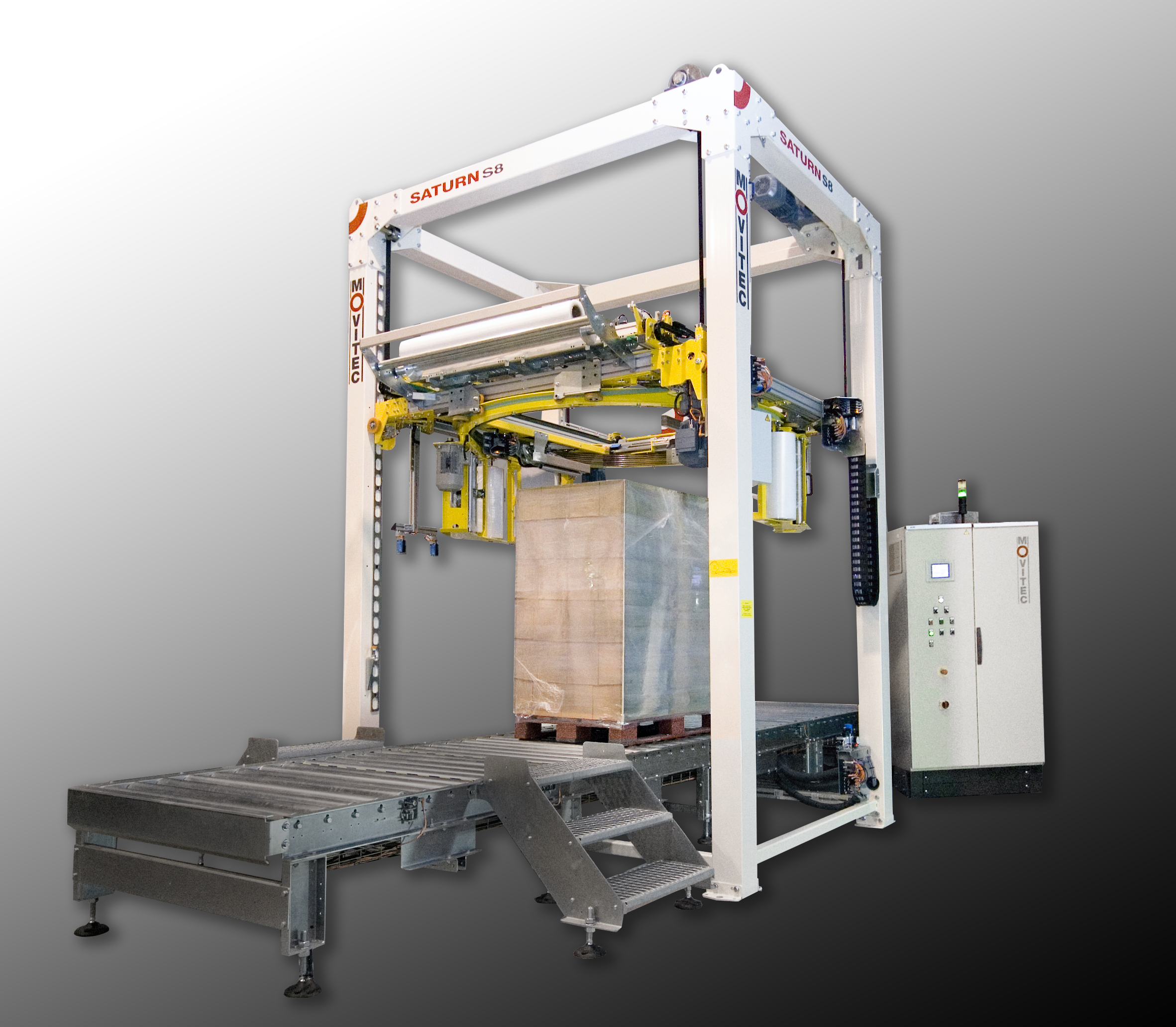
Automatic wrapping machine for unit loads

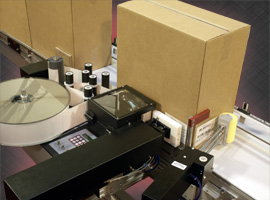
Automatic box labeling machine

Logistics automation systems comprise a variety of hardware and software components:

- Fixed machinery
  - Automated storage and retrieval systems, including:
    - Cranes serve a rack of locations, allowing many levels of stock to be stacked vertically, and allowing for higher storage densities and better space utilization than alternatives.
    - In systems produced by Amazon Robotics, automated guided vehicles move items to a human picker.
  - Conveyors: Containers can enter automated conveyors in one area of the warehouse and, either through hard-coded rules or data input, be moved to a selected destination.
    - Vertical carousels based on the paternoster lift system or using space optimization, similar to vending machines, but on a larger scale.
  - Sortation systems: similar to conveyors but typically with higher capacity and able to divert containers more quickly. Typically used to distribute high volumes of small cartons to a large set of locations.
  - Industrial robots: four- to six-axis industrial robots, e.g. palletizing robots, are used for palletizing, depalletizing, packaging, commissioning and order picking.
  - Typically all of these will automatically identify and track containers using barcodes or, increasingly, RFID tags.
- Motion check weighers may be used to reject cases or individual products that are under or over their specified weight. They are often used in kitting conveyor lines to ensure all pieces belonging in the kit are present.
- Mobile technology
  - Radio data terminals: these are handheld or truck-mounted terminals which connect by radio to logistics automation software and provide instructions to operators moving throughout the warehouse. Many also have barcode scanners to allow identification of containers more quickly and accurately than manual keyboard entry.
- Software
  - Integration software: this provides overall control of the automation machinery and allows cranes to be connected to conveyors for seamless stock movements.
  - Operational control software: provides low-level decision-making, such as where to store incoming containers, and where to retrieve them when requested.
  - Business control software: provides higher-level functionality, such as identification of incoming deliveries/stock, scheduling order fulfillment, and assignment of stock to outgoing trailers.

== Benefits ==
A typical warehouse or distribution center will receive stock of a variety of products from suppliers and store these until the receipt of orders from customers, whether individual buyers (e.g. mail order), retail branches (e.g. chain stores), or other companies (e.g. wholesalers). A logistics automation system may provide the following:

- Automated goods in processes: Incoming goods can be marked with barcodes and the automation system notified of the expected stock. On arrival, the goods can be scanned and thereby identified, and taken via conveyors, sortation systems, and automated cranes into an automatically assigned storage location.
- Automated goods retrieval for orders: On receipt of orders, the automation system is able to immediately locate goods and retrieve them to a pick-face location.
- Automated dispatch processing: Combining knowledge of all orders placed at the warehouse the automation system can assign picked goods into dispatch units and then into outbound loads. Sortation systems and conveyors can then move these onto the outgoing trailers.
- If needed, repackaging to ensure proper protection for further distribution or to change the package format for specific retailers/customers.

A complete warehouse automation system can drastically reduce the workforce required to run a facility, with human input required only for a few tasks, such as picking units of product from a bulk packed case. Even here, assistance can be provided with equipment such as pick-to-light units. Smaller systems may only be required to handle part of the process. Examples include automated storage and retrieval systems, which simply use cranes to store and retrieve identified cases or pallets, typically into a high-bay storage system which would be unfeasible to access using fork-lift trucks or any other means. The use of Automatic Guided Vehicles maximizes the output compared to humans since they can do repetitive tasks for long hours and with least to no supervision. An AGV is built and programmed for precision and accuracy thereby reducing the chances of errors in a warehouse, especially when dealing with fragile goods.

== Automation software ==
Software or cloud-based SaaS solutions are used for logistics automation which helps the supply chain industry in automating the workflow as well as management of the system. Knowledge @ Wharton staff writers noted in 2011 that some manufacturers and retailers were weathering the Great Recession "by signing up for pay-as-you-go logistics services available through the Internet 'cloud'". They identified the benefits and reduced costs which came from sharing information about shipments with suppliers, hauliers and end users.

There is little generalized software available in this market. This is because there is no rule to generalize the system as well as work flow even though the practice is more or less the same. Most of the commercial companies do use one or the other of the custom solutions.

But there are various software solutions that are being used within the departments of logistics. There are a few departments in Logistics, namely: Conventional Department, Container Department, Warehouse, Marine Engineering, Heavy Haulage, etc.

Software used in these departments

- Conventional department : CVT software / CTMS software.
- Container Trucking: CTMS software
- Warehouse : WMS/WCS

Improving Effectiveness of Logistics Management

1. Logistical Network
2. Information
3. Transportation
4. Sound Inventory Management
5. Warehousing, Materials Handling & Packaging

== See also ==
- Automation
- Autonomous logistics
- Material handling equipment
- Self-driving truck
- Automated storage and retrieval system
- Automated guided vehicle
