= Hôtel de Ville, Wasquehal =

Town hall in Wasquehal, France

Hôtel de Ville
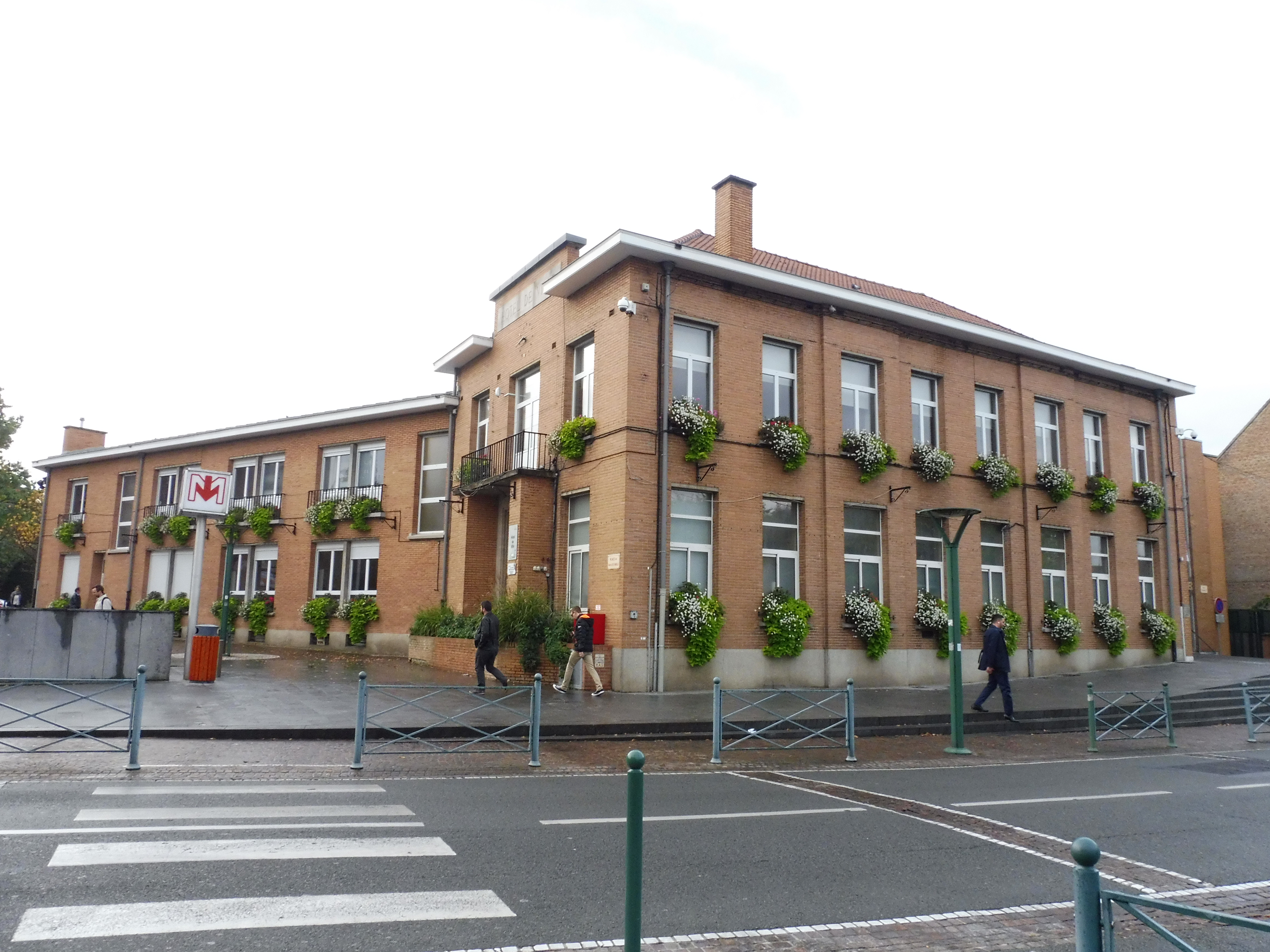
- The main frontage of the Hôtel de Ville in November 2017

General information
- Type: City hall
- Architectural style: Neoclassical style
- Location: Wasquehal, France
- Coordinates: 50.6696°N 3.1307°E
- Completed: 1867

The Hôtel de Ville (French pronunciation: [otɛl də vil], City Hall) is a municipal building in Wasquehal, Nord, in northern France, standing on Rue Michelet.

== History ==
The town hall before it was remodelled

Following the French Revolution, the new town council initially met in the home of the mayor at the time. This arrangement continued until the mid-19th century when the council led by the mayor, Louis-Théodore-Joseph Brulois, decided to commission a dedicated town hall. The site they selected was on the southwest side of the town square, now Place du Général-de-Gaulle, next to the Church of Saint-Nicolas. Construction of the new building started in 1861. It was designed in the neoclassical style, built in red brick with stone finishings and was completed in 1867.

The design involved a symmetrical main frontage of three bays facing onto the square. The central bay featured a short flight of steps leading up to a segmental-headed doorway flanked by pilasters decorated with lamps and supporting a cornice. On the first floor, there was a French door with iron railings and, at roof level, there was a clock with a spire and a finial. The outer bays were fenestrated by square-headed windows on the ground floor and by segmental-headed windows on the first floor. There were full-height Doric order pilasters at the corners of the building supporting a cornice.

Following the implementation of the French law on the Separation of the Churches and the State in 1905, the mayor, Louis Lejeune-Mulliez, evicted the clergy from the clergy house, which was attached to the town hall and canted forward on its left. The former clergy house was then converted into a maternity hospital which opened in 1908 and continued in that use until 1942. The complex was remodelled in the 1980s, under the leadership of the mayor, Gérard Vignoble, with the façade of the old town hall being modernised and the former maternity hospital becoming offices for the urban planning department.

On 25 April 1983, the president of France, François Mitterrand, visited the town hall and delivered a speech. A bust created by the sculptor, André Missant, depicting the writer, Maxence Van der Meersch, was unveiled on the opposite side of Rue Michelet, facing the town hall, in June 1989.
