= Voice-directed warehousing =

Logostics technology

Voice-directed warehousing (VDW) refers to the use of the voice direction and speech recognition software in warehouses and distribution centers. VDW has been in use since the late 1990s, with its use increasing drastically since.

In a voice directed warehouse, workers wear a headset connected to a small wearable computer, similar in size to a Sony Walkman, which tells the worker where to go and what to do using verbal prompts. Workers confirm their tasks by speaking pre-defined commands and reading confirmation codes printed on locations or products throughout the warehouse. The speech recognition software running on the wearable computer 'understands' the workers' responses.

Voice-directed warehousing is typically used instead of paper- or mobile computer-based systems that require workers to read instructions and scan barcodes or key-enter information to confirm their tasks. By freeing a worker's hands and eyes, voice directed systems typically improve efficiency, accuracy, and safety. Whilst VDW was originally used in picking orders, now all warehouse functions such as goods receiving, put-away, replenishment, shipping, and returns processing can be coordinated by voice systems.

== Overview ==
The first incarnations of voice directed warehousing were implemented in distribution centers in the early 1990s. Since then, voice has changed dramatically. Most notably, the technology was originally limited to picking, whereas now all warehouse functions (picking, receiving/put-away, replenishment, shipping) can be coordinated by voice systems. As these processes move from being paper-centric, to RF-centric (barcode scanning) and now voice-centric. For some, voice has become the starting point for re-engineering warehouse processes and systems, rather than an after-thought.

VDW technology has also undergone an evolution as more competitors have entered the market. The first solutions were based on dedicated and rugged voice appliances, mobile computing devices that ran the speech recognition software and that communicated with a server over a wireless network. These special purpose voice appliances use a speech recognition engine that was specially designed for the warehouse and provided by the appliance manufacturer.

Since the early 2000s, more voice suppliers have entered the market, providing voice recognition systems for standard mobile computing devices that had been used previously for barcode scanning applications in the warehouse. These standard mobile computers from companies like Motorola, Intermec and LXE also support non-proprietary recognition software. The uncoupling of the hardware and speech recognition software has resulted in lower priced voice-directed warehousing solutions and an increase in the number of software providers. These two factors contributed to a rapid rise in adoption of VDW that continues today.

== Benefits ==
Implementing voice systems in the warehouse has among its benefits:

- Improved safety
- Increased picking accuracy
- Increased inventory accuracy
- Growing customer satisfaction
- Increased employee productivity
- Reduced new worker training time
- Increases job satisfaction for warehouse associates
- Eliminates cost of printing and distributing picking documents

One of the great productivity benefits of voice-based systems is that they allow operators to do two things at once whereas other media used in warehouses such as paper or radio frequency terminals tend to require that you surrender the use of at least one hand or you have to stop and read something before proceeding. This productivity benefit tends to be inversely related to the fraction of an operator's day spent walking. Reduced picking errors and flexibility of the voice picking technology tend to improve customer service to meet just-in-time order fulfillment. Some robust systems have independent language recognition engines hence they can be used by non-native employees.
