= Mecalux =

- Mecalux
- Founded: 1966
- Headquarters: Cornellà de Llobregat, Barcelona, Spain
- Products: Automated warehouses, robotics, logistics software, industrial racking
- Revenue: €1,147 billion
- Employees: 5,151
- Website: www.mecalux.com

Mecalux is a multinational company specialising in the design and manufacture of solutions for logistics and warehouse management, including storage systems, automation, software and robotics. Headquartered in Cornellà de Llobregat (Barcelona), it has offices in 24 countries, operates in more than 70 countries, and has production centres in Europe and the Americas.

== History ==
The company was founded in L´Hospitalet de Llobregat (Barcelona) in 1966 by José Luis Carrillo as a small workshop specialising in the manufacture of light-gauge metal shelving. Over the following decades, it expanded its product range to include industrial pallet storage systems and extended its sales network to various regions of Spain.

During the 1980s, the company began its international expansion by opening branches in France and Argentina, while also developing new industrial storage systems, including automated systems and self-supporting racking. In the 1990s, it expanded its international presence with sales offices across Europe and the Americas.

From the 2000s onwards, the company stepped up its activities in robotics and warehouse software development. This strategy was reinforced in 2005 with the acquisition of Tkinsa, a company specialising in logistics automation and part of the German ThyssenKrupp group, and the Spanish company Esmena, based in Gijón.

In 2009, it acquired the US companies UFC Interlake Holding Co., United Fixtures Company Inc., and Interlake Material Handling Inc., and began operating in North America under the Interlake Mecalux brand.

Mecalux was listed on the Spanish stock exchanges via the Mercado Continuo between 1999 and 2010. That year the Carrillo family launched a takeover bid to delist the company from the stock market.

== Business ==
The company’s operations are centred on three main areas: logistics software, warehouse automation and robotics, and industrial racking for pallets and boxes.

In the field of logistics software, it develops a warehouse management system (WMS) called Easy WMS, complemented by modules designed for specific logistics operations. It also offers a distributed order management system (Easy DOM), warehouse control system (WCS) and a warehouse execution system (WES), designed to coordinate the automated and robotic systems used in logistics centres.

The automation and robotics division includes systems for the storage and internal transport of pallets and boxes, including stacker cranes, shuttles, conveyors, autonomous mobile robots (AMRs) and order-picking stations.

In the industrial racking sector, it manufactures pallet storage systems, including selective, high density and high-bay self-supporting racking, as well as systems for storing and picking small goods.

It has developed logistics automation and software projects for companies in sectors such as food, pharmaceuticals, retail, e-commerce, third-party logistics, aerospace, defence, distribution and cold chain, among others.

== International presence ==
According to audited corporate figures from 2025 the group has its own sales network in 24 countries and 12 production centres across Europe, North America and South America.

The group´s European production facilities are located in Spain (Barcelona, Gijón and Palencia) and Poland (Gliwice). In North America, it operates centres in the United States (Chicago, Illinois) and in Mexico (Tijuana and Matamoros). It´s South American manufacturing facilities are in Brazil (São Paulo) and Argentina (Buenos Aires).

== Research and development ==
Mecalux collaborates with universities and research centres on projects relating to logistics automation, artificial intelligence and warehouse engineering. In 2024, it joined the Connèxia UPC programme at the Polytechnic University of Catalonia. That same year it launched the Intelligent Logistics Systems Lab with the MIT Center for Transportation & Logistics, part of the Massachusetts Institute of Technology, to develop artificial intelligence applications for the supply chain. It also maintains close ties with the School of Computer Engineering at the University of Oviedo, regularly taking part in talks, careers fairs and a wide range of other initiatives.

Since 2025, it has been collaborating on the European Saverack project, which focuses on studying the resistance of industrial racking systems to seismic activity.

The group has four centres dedicated to research and development in robotics and automation, located in Spain (Barcelona and Gijón), United States (Chicago) and Poland (Gliwice), as well as three software development centres located in Spain (Gijón, Salamanca and Badajoz).
