= Eclipse ERP =

Accounting software used by distribution companies

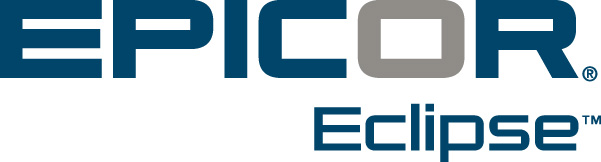
- Original authors: Clark Yennie; David Berger; Steven Grundt; Richard Montegna; Scott Raderstorf
- Developers: Eclipse Inc; Intuit; Activant; Epicor
- Release: 26 November 1990; 35 years ago
- Stable release: 9.0.4 / 27 April 2018; 8 years ago
- Operating system: Linux; AIX
- Type: ERP
- License: Proprietary

Eclipse ERP is a real-time transaction processing accounting software used for order fulfillment, inventory control, accounting, purchasing, and sales. It was created for wholesale distributors in the Electrical, HVAC, Plumbing, and PVF industries, but is used by a wide range of market sectors. At one point this software was called Intuit Eclipse DMS, and Activant Eclipse, and Eclipse Distribution Management System.

The backend runs on a NoSQL UniVerse database from Rocket U2.

== History ==
Before Eclipse ERP was created in 1990, distributors mainly in the North-East used SHIMS (Supply House Information Management System) that was owned by Ultimate Data Systems.

Development of Eclipse ERP started in 1990 by Eclipse Inc.; the original team consisted of Clark Yennie, Michael E. London, David Berger, Steven Grundt, and Richard Montegna. In 2002, Eclipse Inc was sold in 2002 to Intuit for $88 million.

Activant bought Eclipse ERP on August 17, 2007, for $100.5 million in cash. Apax Partners merged Epicor and Activant on April 5, 2011.

Thus Epicor became the owner of Eclipse ERP. Over the years Eclipse ERP was operating under numerous brands.

== User interface ==
Client stations connect to the Eclipse server via an Eclipse terminal emulator called Eterm and/or a thick, Java based, Solar Eclipse client. Solar Eclipse was introduced in version 8.0 in May 2004, and replaced with version 9.0 in May 2015.

== Key features ==
=== Usage scenarios ===
Typical users are distribution companies, members of trade associations, with multiple regional branches and hundreds of employees. Typically these companies employ outside salesmen who travel. Inside salespeople provide support to customers over the phone or email. Distribution center personnel use Eclipse ERP as a Distribution Center Management System. They do order picking, order processing, maintain inventory in stock, and send products to customers via shipping carriers. Accounting department deals with general ledger, AP, AR, and credit control. Marketing department is responsible for online and printed promotional material. Purchasing department deals with procurement from manufacturers and vendors in the supply chain. These business processes must be adjusted to work specifically with Eclipse ERP. The cost of the software depends on the numbers of concurrent user licenses and the number of companion products.

=== Featured packages ===
The software has support for multi-branch operations, an integrated interface for emailing and faxing (using VsiFax), customer calling queue (trouble tickets), and several add-ons are available for an employee punch-clock, RF warehousing, Digital Imaging, Proof of Delivery/Signature Capture, and others. Pricing Engine allows setting pricing for customer classes, product groups, individual products, or customers, quantity breaks. Customers can have different price classes based on volume, and/or location. Price can be set for future effective dates. Authorization Keys give flexibility with user access and security in a similar way as Access Control Matrix. Warehouse in Process Status Queue shows what order to pick for customers, what transfers to receive from other branches, or purchase orders to receive from vendors.

Real-time Data and Business Summary displays the income statement and balance sheet. Sales Order Management allows receipt of payment from customers at the counter or over the phone. Mass Load is used to update information in the database. Third-party integration extends the functionality of the base product. Navigation menus are customized for unique users or whole departments. Accounting and Financial Management includes Receivables, Payables, Cash register. Inventory Management shows inventory levels, precise product locations, history, ranking, and demand. Purchasing and Transfers are suggested by the system based on previous history and future demand.

== Community ==
Epicor hosts an annual Epicor Insights conference to provide networking and training on products, including Eclipse.

== Logo versions ==
1991–1997

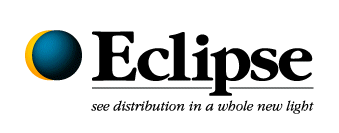
1997–2002

2002–2007

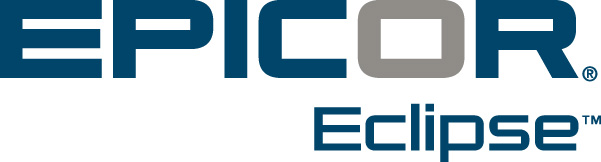
Present

== See also ==
- Distribution center
- Distribution center management system
- Enterprise integration
- List of ERP software packages
- Order management system
- Procurement
- Strategic sourcing
- Supply chain management
- Transportation management system
- Warehouse management system
