= Waveless order fulfillment =

Waveless Order Fulfillment is a methodology used in distribution centers for fulfilling orders, or order picking. Waveless picking is a form of "batch picking" where items for multiple orders are collected, or picked, together at the same time to be divided into separate orders at a later time in the process. The collection of items is called a "batch." Historically, the terms wave picking and batch picking have been synonymous as wave picking is a means of achieving batch picking.

Batch picking, both wave and waveless, reduces the travel or motion associated with fulfilling orders in a distribution center. Motion is “non-productive” and one of the 7 wastes identified in lean processing. Batch picking provides great advantages when individual orders are of just a few units and where items are located over great areas as would be found in modern eCommerce operations. In such circumstances, the required work, effort and time is reduced by having a travel path where pickers collect items from the required locations in a "batch". However, the efficiency gained by picking the batch is reduced by the effort to separate the gathered items into orders. This profile is common in direct-to-consumer e-commerce operations. Some operations may use an automated storage and retrieval system that allows material to be delivered to complete orders; however, these operations also often benefit from batching items for multiple orders.

== Batch Creation ==
The distinction in wave and waveless fulfillment is the means in which the batch is created. In both cases, the batch represents a collection of items required for a set of orders. In a wave-based system, a collection of orders for a batch is determined, also known as selected. Next, the individual items required for the set of orders are identified and included in the batch. The size of the batch is limited to ensure that the batch may be sorted. When including the order items in the batch, the collection of items may be grouped into multiple task lists. Each task list is optimized to minimize the required travel to collect the items. The entire batch is called a wave and the wave is complete when all the required items have been obtained.

In both a wave and a waveless operation, the size of the batch is limited by the ability of the downstream sorting process to separate out the items. Items arriving at the sorting process may come in an undefined sequence, and the sorting system must then be able to hold an early arriving item until the latest required item arrives for the order. If newly arriving items do not have a place to be held while awaiting the later arriving items, they must be set aside until a consolidation space becomes available.

In a waveless system the "batch" of orders is ever evolving; new orders may be added to the batch as existing orders have been completed. This is called a revolving batch where the batch size is dynamically specified by the warehouse execution system. With this continuous flow of items through the revolving batch, as one order is completed another order is added to the process. With wave picking order completion is bunched up at the end of the wave while with waveless picking order completion occurs continuously.
