= Bruce Johnson =

Bruce Johnson may refer to:

- Bruce Johnson (gridiron football) (born 1987), American football cornerback
- Bruce Johnson (Canadian executive) (active since 1992), Canadian executive
- Bruce Johnson (journalist) (1950–2022), American journalist
- Bruce Johnson (Ohio politician) (born 1960), American politician
- Bruce Johnson (Wisconsin politician) (1875–1932), American politician, Wisconsin state senator from 1927 to 1931
- Bruce Johnson (minister) (1938–1969), Methodist minister in Chicago
- W. Bruce Johnson, American businessman

== See also ==
- Bruce Forsyth-Johnson or Bruce Forsyth (1928–2017), English entertainer
- Bruce Johnston (disambiguation)
- Bruce Johnstone (disambiguation)
