= Cougar Software =

Software company in Canada

- Type: Private
- Industry: Computer software
- Founded: 1992
- Defunct: 2015
- Number of locations: Toronto, Ontario, Canada; Sydney, Australia; London, England; New York City, USA
- Key people: Founder: Bruce Millar; CEO: Oren Rosen; CFO: Gidon Kerbel; COO: Harold Krawitz; VP Operations and Sales: Lara Dodo
- Services: Financial modeling for the commercial real estate industry

Cougar Software developed budgeting, planning and forecasting software for real estate investors in the commercial real estate industry globally. Cougar Software was founded in Australia in 1992. It later moved to Toronto. The company had offices in Canada, Australia, United Kingdom and the United States.

In February 2015, Cougar was acquired by MRI Software of Solon, Ohio.

== History ==
Cougar Software was founded in Sydney, Australia in 1992 by Bruce Millar. Oren Rosen, who previously held leadership positions with firms such as PricewaterhouseCoopers, joined Cougar Software as Vice President in 2007, and then took over as the company's Chief Executive Officer in 2008.

In 2014, Rosen was appointed to the board of the Open Standards Consortium for Real Estate (OSCRE), reinforcing the company's support of OSCRE industry standards.

Cougar Software worked in partnership with various consulting and technology firms in the real estate management realm, including Hipercept, RealFoundations, MRI Software, and iKindi.

Cougar Software was acquired by MRI Software on February 3, 2015 and is now referred to as MRI Strategic Planning.

== Recognition ==
Cougar Software was a 2014 finalist in the Real Estate Technology Innovation category of the "Digie" Awards.
