= Tom Proulx =

American computer programmer and entrepreneur

- Other name: Thomas Proulx
- Education: Stanford University
- Occupations: Software programmer, business executive
- Years active: 1983–present
- Known for: Quicken, Quickbooks

Thomas Proulx is an American computer programmer and entrepreneur. He was a co-founder and first programmer of Intuit and a pioneer of usability testing in the 1980s. He wrote the first version of Quicken. He co-founded Intuit in 1983, and later became involved with NetPulse.

== Early life and education ==
He earned an electrical engineering degree from Stanford University and was a Hughes Fellow.

== Career ==
=== Intuit ===
In 1983, he began designing Quicken in his dorm room at Stanford.

In 1983, Scott Cook went to Stanford University in California, United States. He wanted a programmer for a planned home bill payment and bank reconciliation program. Proulx was the first person Cook met and subsequently co-founded Intuit. Proulx was the first programmer of the first version of Quicken, and the first Apple and Radio Shack versions. He obtained a patent for finding a way for a computer to verify that a user had correctly inserted blank checks in a dot matrix printer. This was essential to the near-universal use of such checks in accounting programs.

After he co-founded Intuit in 1983, the company ran into financial difficulties, with staff working at one point for nine months without pay.

In 1984, in what may have been the first case of usability testing with engineers, Intuit recruited people off the street to test Quicken with a stopwatch. After each test Proulx improved Quicken. Before this, experienced computer users spent an hour or more installing programs and printing a check. Novices often gave up. Quicken allowed inexperienced computer users to do it in less than 15 minutes, printing checks faster than writing them. The market share of Quicken varied from 65% to 98%, making it a killer application, which drove many computer sales. It also made usability testing a standard industry practice.

In 1985, the company lost key employees due to a lack of funds, with Proulx as one of four remaining employees working for free for six months. They worked on Quicken, which they used to create an advertising revenue stream. In 1985, while Proulx was one of three Intuit employees, Intuit became the first company to shrink-wrap floppy disks and manuals. This further revolutionized software development. By 1992, all major Intuit programs had a market share of 75% or more. Proulx created an Intuit credit card with a download service, that automatically classified charges. Proulx was a recipient of the Inc. Magazine Entrepreneur of the Year Award in 1992. In 1993, he actively assisted with helping Intuit go public and was the driving force behind its Chip Soft TurboTax merger. He resigned soon after.

He retired from Intuit in 1994. Afterward, he became a private investor in several startup companies.

=== Netpulse ===
He co-founded Netpulse, Inc. In June 2000, Netpulse E-Zone Media Networks was formed out of E-Zone Networks, Netpulse Communications, and Xystos Media Networks in a merger. The CEO was Andrew Wiswell. In July 2000, he was serving as Netpulse CEO.

Proulx was the Chairman of Netpulse from 2001 to 2018. In 2008, the company filed for Chapter 7 bankruptcy protection. Three months later, Tom Proulx came out of retirement and "traded his creditorship for the company’s remaining assets," announced on May 3 in San Francisco, and made the company solvent again.

== Boards and committees ==
By 2004, he had been a director on the boards of tech startups such as UpShot, Documagix, and NextSet. He was the chairman of Netpulse. On December 14, 2004, he was named a director of Izalex Incorporated. He remains on the boards of eGym and served on the boards of iControl, PlumChoice, and Dropwater. In 2021, he was also involved with 1047 Games, founded by his son Ian.

== Personal life ==
As of 2017, he has an estate in Atherton, California. He has two children.

=== Political involvement ===
Wired noted in late 1996 that Proulx "began Silicon Valley's anti-211 crusade. This spring, Proulx raised $12 million from friends in the high-tech industry to pass ballot initiatives. It would have made California courts the most inhospitable in the nation to securities fraud suits. The campaign to defeat 211 was more broad-based than his fledgling effort earlier this year." By that November, the California Technology Alliance group had "hired a lobbyist to represent it in the state capital."
