= Distribution center management system =

Warehouse management system

Distribution Center Management System (DCMS) is a proprietary end-user warehouse management system, designed to track the activities performed in a distribution center or warehouse. It is created and owned by a private company, Eclipse Systems Pvt Ltd. It automates the entire process flow of receiving, managing, and shipping goods to customers from the warehouse. DCMS solutions are designed for both large and small-scale businesses. In January 2015, the product went open source.

== Features ==
DCMS uses a modular design featuring the following modules:

- receiving
- putaway
- order processing
- replenishment
- pulling
- restocking
- picking
- validation
- sorting
- shipping

Features of a DCMS also include:

- crate management
- supervisory control
- reports
- works in both RF-based and paper-based environments
- third-party software integration

== Benefits ==
DCMS helps warehouses to remove the risk of stock pile-up, stock-outs, pending orders and loss of sales due to customer dissatisfaction. It dramatically improves warehouse productivity, helps strengthen customer relationships, reduces operating expenses, and increases warehouse and distribution efficiencies. Due to its modular design, DCMS can be easily customized for various clients as per their requirements. WMS is an intelligent investment that will instantly boost accuracy in the warehouse operations and yields long-term financial benefits.

== ERP systems ==
Contemporary inventory management strategies such as JIT (Just In Time), ECR (Efficient Customer Response), and QR (Quick Response) demonstrate potential applications for DCMS. Enterprise resource planning (ERP) systems can be replaced by DCMS due to its functionality fit, knowledge base, frequent updates, integration, and adaptive capacities.

== System architecture ==
DCMS is based on Microsoft technology with Oracle as a database. It uses web-based three tier architecture that provides a standard suite of warehousing applications. DCMS can also be installed on cloud servers and used as SaaS. DCMS provides web-based multi-department reporting.

== See also ==
- Manufacturing resource planning
- Shipping list
- Pick and pack
- Cycle count
- Voice-directed warehousing
- Automated storage and retrieval system
- Wave picking
