= Karl Cook =

American equestrian (born 1990)

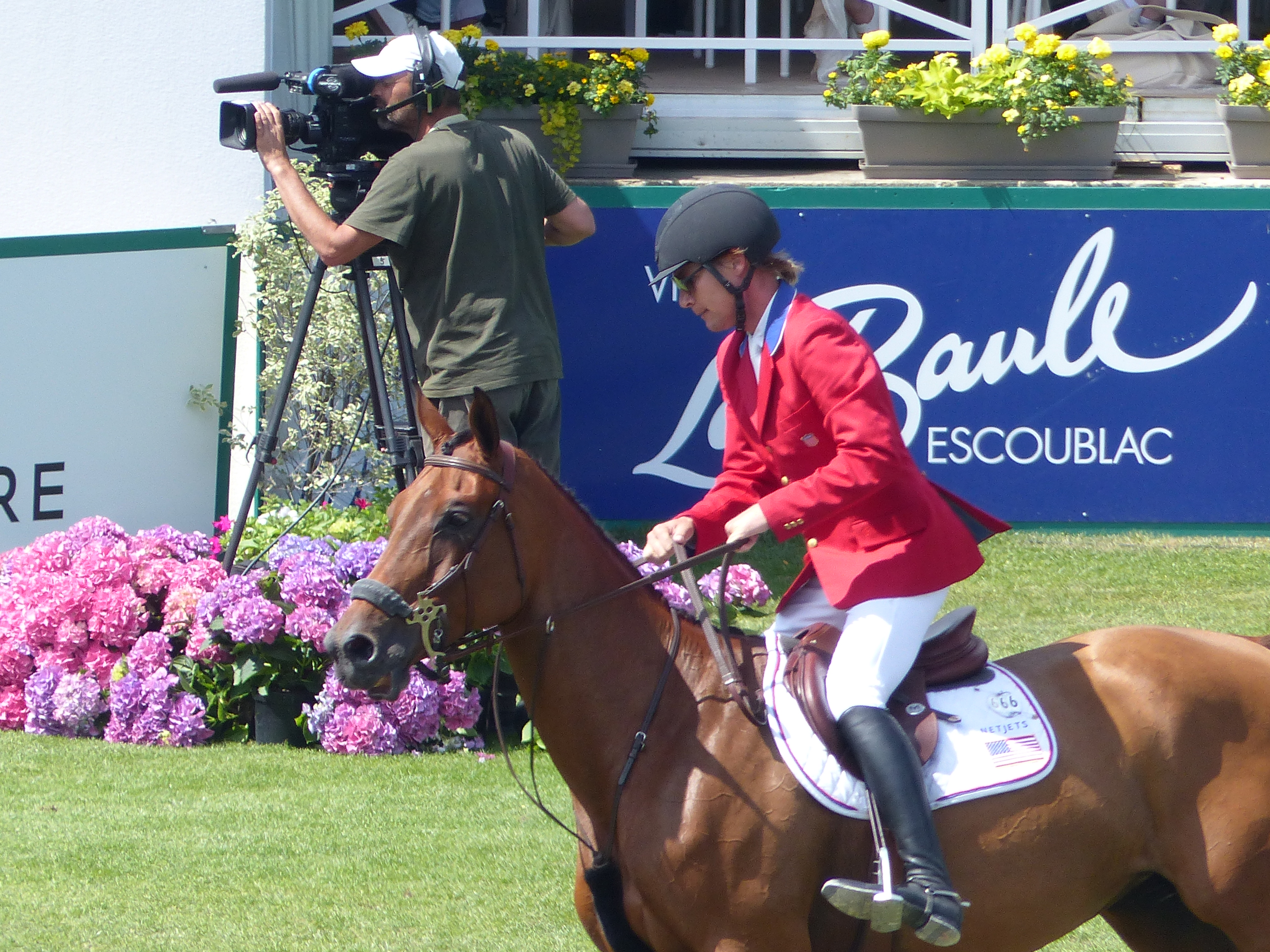
- Cook in 2024

Personal information
- Born: December 25, 1990 (age 35) Woodside, California, U.S.
- Spouses: Kaley Cuoco (m. 2018; div. 2022); Mackenzie Drazan (m. 2024)
- Parent: Scott Cook (father)

Sport
- Country: United States
- Sport: Equestrian
- Event: Show jumping
Medal record
Equestrian
Representing United States
Olympic Games
Silver medal – second place	2024 Paris	Team jumping

Karl Cook (born December 25, 1990) is an American show jumper. He was a silver medalist at the 2024 Summer Olympics, where he competed as a last-minute replacement for teammate Kent Farrington.

== Early life ==
Karl Cook was born on December 25, 1990, to billionaire businessman Scott Cook (co-founder of Intuit), and Signe Ostby.

== Personal life ==
Cook began dating actress Kaley Cuoco in late 2016. They became engaged on November 30, 2017, Cuoco's 32nd birthday, and were married on June 30, 2018. In September 2021, the couple announced their separation, and in June 2022, their divorce was finalized.

Cook began dating entrepreneur Mackenzie Drazan. They became engaged on June 20, 2023, and were married on April 20, 2024.
