= Netpulse =

American fitness technology company

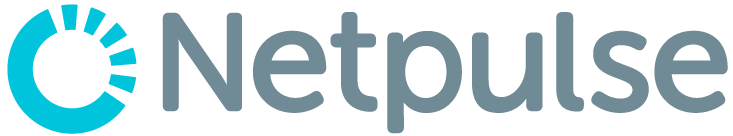
- Industry: Fitness technology
- Founded: 1993; 33 years ago
- Founder: Kevin Martin; Jeff Cahn; Mike Alvarez Cohen
- Fate: Purchased in 2018 by eGym
- Headquarters: San Francisco
- Owner: eGym
- Website: www.netpulse.com

Netpulse was an American fitness technology company, and a provider of branded mobile apps for health clubs. Established in 1993, Netpulse was acquired by eGym in 2018.

== History ==
=== 1993-2000 ===
Netpulse was founded in 1993 by partners Mike Alvarez Cohen, Kevin Martin and Jeff Cahn.

Thomas Proulx, the co-founder of Intuit, joined Netpulse as CEO in 1995, with Bryan Arp joining the company in 1996 as its first product manager.

In June 2000, Netpulse E-Zone Media Networks was formed out of E-Zone Networks, Netpulse Communications, and Xystos Media Networks in a merger. The CEO was Andrew Wiswell. Later in July 2000, Tom Proulx resumed his role as Netpulse CEO.

=== 2001-present ===
After the merger with eZone in 2000 proved problematic, Netpulse was re-started in 2001 by Proulx and Arp.

In 2001, the company filed for Chapter 7 bankruptcy protection. Three months later, Tom Proulx came out of retirement and "traded his creditor-ship for the company’s remaining assets," which was announced on May 3 in San Francisco, and made the company solvent again. Netpulse made touch screen displays for exercise equipment as of 2010. That year, it raised first $3.1 and then $2 million.

Netpulse acquired Virtual Active in 2011, a San Francisco-based media company that produces exercise-focused, virtual reality products. Former Virtual Active Founder John Ford has since been promoted to Co-CEO of Netpulse.

Netpulse acquired Club Apps in 2014, one of the largest providers of custom club mobile applications. The acquisition expanded the Netpulse platform to an additional 700 clubs in the U.S. It also resulted in, Kelly Sweeney, co-founder and former president of Club Apps, joining Netpulse as Vice President of Sales.

In 2018, Netpulse was acquired by eGym, with CEO John Ford replaced with Alex Peacock. Netpulse chairman Tom Proulx joined eGym's board of directors.

== Funding ==
Netpulse has received $40M funding from August Capital, Nokia Growth Ventures and DFJ Frontier. The company's board of directors includes Mark Mastrov and David Marquardt.
