= DCMS =

DCMS may refer to:

- Department for Digital, Culture, Media and Sport, a department of the British government
- Deccan College of Medical Sciences, a medical college in Hyderabad, India
- Distribution center management system, in the field of warehousing, logistics and supply chain management
- Desert Christian Middle School, one of the Desert Christian Schools, a middle school in Lancaster, California
