= Bruce Johnstone =

Bruce Johnstone may refer to:

- Bruce Johnstone (musician) (born 1943), American jazz saxophonist
- Bruce Johnstone (racing driver) (1937–2022), South African Formula One racing driver
- D. Bruce Johnstone (born 1941), American educator, former chancellor of SUNY

== See also ==
- Bruce Johnston (disambiguation)
- Bruce Johnson (disambiguation)
