= Epicor =

U.S. software company

- Type: Private
- Industry: Computer software
- Founded: 1972
- Headquarters: Austin, Texas
- Key people: Vaibhav Vohra (CEO); Lisa Pope (President)
- Products: ERP, Retail Software
- Revenue: US $1.05 billion FY 2022
- Owner: CD&R
- Number of employees: 4,600
- Website: www.epicor.com

Epicor Software Corporation is a business software company based in Austin, Texas founded in 1972. Its products are aimed at the manufacturing, distribution, retail and services industries.

Epicor provides enterprise resource planning (ERP), customer relationship management (CRM), supply chain management (SCM), and human capital management (HCM) software to business customers in both software as a service (SaaS) and on-premises deployment models.

== History ==
=== 1972–2000 ===
Advanced Business Microsystems (ABM) was a company founded in 1984. ABM created a suite of accounting software for MS-DOS and marketed it in a joint venture with IBM known as The Platinum Series. ABM developed the Platinum line into a financial accounting software product designed for multi-user LAN-based environments. ABM was renamed Platinum Software Corporation in 1992 in preparation for its initial public offering.

Platinum announced a version of its products for Microsoft Windows in 1993. Platinum acquired Clientele in 1997, and FocusSoft, an extension to Platinum's existing distribution solution. After a year, Platinum merged with DataWorks to extend its manufacturing solutions and operations. DataWorks Corporation was founded in 1977 (as Budget Computer Systems, San Diego, CA) specializing in integrated enterprise resource planning (ERP) systems targeted at high tech sector companies. In 1999, Platinum/DataWorks became Epicor Software Corporation.

=== 2001–2010 ===
Epicor sold the Platinum for Windows (PFW) products to Sage Group in 2001.

Epicor for Service Enterprises, which automated enterprise services and was completely web-based, was released in 2003. The company acquired CompuNet for the hospitality. It acquired Scala in 2004. In 2005, Epicor purchased CRS Retail to provide a comprehensive retail suite. NSB was purchased in 2007 to expand retail offerings. In late 2010, Epicor purchased privately held SPECTRUM Human Resource Systems Corporation to further deliver service from a single-point of accountability.

=== 2011–present ===
Another predecessor company, incorporated in 1972 as Triad Systems Corporation, was renamed Activant in 2003, and continued to grow through acquisition.

In 2011, Apax Partners purchased both Activant and Epicor and merged the organizations together retaining the Epicor name as a privately held company. Pervez Qureshi, prior CEO of Activant, became CEO of the new Epicor in May 2011.

In April 2012, Epicor partnered with ASA Automotive Systems Inc. to help ASA dealers increase vehicle parts and service revenue with Epicor Integrated Service Estimator.

In October 2012, Epicor acquired Solarsoft Business Systems, established in 2007 from the merger of CMS Software Inc. of Toronto and XKO Software Ltd from the UK. Before the acquisition, Solarsoft acquired Progressive Solutions in June 2012.

On October 7, 2013, Epicor appointed Joseph L. Cowan as President and CEO.

In October 2014, Epicor announced its acquisition of privately held QuantiSense, Inc., a provider of cloud and on-premises retail analytics software and services for leading specialty and department store chains.

On January 6, 2015, Epicor completes acquisition of privately held ShopVisible, LLC.

In June 2015, Epicor Retail was spun off from Epicor and became Aptos, Inc.

On July 5, 2016, Epicor announced that it has entered into a definitive agreement to be acquired by the global investment firm KKR. The acquisition by KKR was finalized on September 1, 2016. Joseph L. Cowan remained president and CEO of Epicor after the acquisition.

On October 1, 2017, Epicor appointed Steve Murphy, prior president of OpenText, president and CEO.

On October 1, 2019, Epicor announced the acquisition of 1 EDI Source, a Solon, Ohio-based provider of Electronic data interchange services and software for an undisclosed amount.

On January 1, 2020, Epicor promoted Himanshu Palsule to president while continuing in his role as Chief Product and Technology officer overseeing Epicor's global portfolio. He will continue to report to CEO Steve Murphy.

On August 31, 2020, KKR announced that it would sell the company to CD&R for $4.7 billion.

On June 12, 2024, Epicor announced its acquisition of KYKLO, a provider of Product Information Management (PIM) and content-driven lead generation solutions for manufacturers and distributors.

On September 30, 2026, Steve Murphy stepped down from the CEO position. He is succeeded by Vaibhav Vohra as he remains on the board.

== Program ==
Epicor also released the plan 'Fit for the Future,' intended to support stakeholders in the group develop market sustainability and thrive in the new environment.

Providers involve resellers, device integrators, and business partners who can use the Epicor software range and services to introduce, plan, and build transformational IT strategies.

== See also ==
- Eclipse ERP
- List of ERP software packages
