= Known Shipper Program =

In response to the September 11, 2001 attacks on the World Trade Center in New York City, the United States Department of Homeland Security (DHS) implemented new rules to ensure the safety of domestic and international air travel in the United States. The rules of this program are administered by the Transportation Security Administration (TSA), who is responsible for the oversight of all transportation security, including truck, rail and ocean, as well as air.

While the specifics of the security program are restricted, the multi-layered program effectively eliminates the anonymous shipment of all documents, parcels, counter-to-counter packages and freight on both passenger and cargo-only flights originating within the U.S. Such anonymous shipments were frequent in the years prior to 2001 and led to growing concern in Congress and amongst the general public about the overall security of air travel.

In the post-September 11 era, shippers who have been properly vetted with the TSA by an air carrier or freight forwarder are considered a Known Shipper with the TSA. Such shippers may tender their freight for shipment on both passenger and cargo-only aircraft, with some restrictions. Available alternatives for Unknown Shippers to ship via air are now very limited. Collectively, this program is known within the industry as the Known Shipper Program. There are concerns that the program may not be sufficient to secure all cargo.
