= TradeGecko =

Software company

- Type: Private limited company
- Industry: Software as a Service
- Founded: 2012
- Founder: Cameron Priest (CEO); Bradley Priest (CTO); Carl Thompson (CMO)
- Headquarters: Singapore, Singapore
- Number of locations: Offices in 3 countries
- Area served: Worldwide
- Products: Cloud Inventory & Order Management
- Website: www.tradegecko.com

TradeGecko is a Singapore based software-as-a-service company that develops online inventory and order management software targeted at SMEs.

TradeGecko provides an inventory management platform targeted at wholesalers and online retailers. The system also integrates with other cloud based software such as Shopify e-commerce, WooCommerce e-commerce, and Xero accounting.

The company was recognised as one of the most innovative business-to-business software providers at the Red Herring Asia 100. On August 4, 2020, Intuit announced an acquisition of TradeGecko for more than US$80 million.

== History ==
TradeGecko was launched in 2013 by Carl Thompson and brothers Cameron and Bradley Priest, three New Zealanders.

Thompson, who ran the label Crowded Elevator, saw the need for a solution in managing inventory administration and made the decision to create one.

The trio went through the JFDI.Asia Accelerate program before going on to raise a round of financing through from Singapore-based investors. In April 2015, TradeGecko raised $6.5 million series A round led by NSI Ventures and Jungle Ventures.

== See also ==
- Supply chain management
