= Counter-to-counter package =

In the airline and some other transportation industries, a counter-to-counter package is a quicker (and more expensive) alternative to standard freight for the shipment of small parcels and envelopes. These shipments have size, weight, and content restrictions, and usually may be dropped off and picked up at a ticket counter, luggage service or freight office.

Additional security regulations put into place after September 11, 2001 have eliminated anonymous counter-to-counter shipments. Entities wishing to ship must register to become a known shipper according to the specific directives of the Federal Aviation Administration and the Transportation Security Administration.

== See also ==
- Pick and pack
- Shipping list
