= Activant =

American technology company

Activant Solutions Inc.
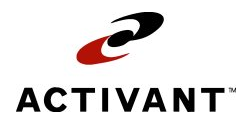
- Type: Subsidiary of Epicor
- Industry: Retail and Wholesale Distribution
- Predecessor: Triad Systems Corporation
- Founded: 1971
- Founder: Henry M. Gay; William W. Stevens; Donald J. Ruder
- Headquarters: Livermore, California, United States
- Number of locations: >12 (2010)
- Area served: worldwide
- Number of employees: >1,700 (2010)
- Website: http://www.activant.com/

Activant Solutions Inc. was a privately held American technology company specializing in business management, software serving retail and wholesale distribution businesses headquartered in Livermore, California.

Activant provided tailored proprietary software, professional services, content, supply chain connectivity, and analytics to the automotive, hardlines and lumber, and wholesale distribution industries.

The company employed more than 1,700 people in California, Texas, Colorado, Illinois, Massachusetts, Pennsylvania, South Carolina, Utah, Canada, Ireland, and the United Kingdom.

Activant Solutions was acquired by Apax Partners and merged with Epicor in May 2011. The combined entity is continuing as Epicor, currently owned by Clayton, Dubilier & Rice LLC.

== History ==
Activant was incorporated in 1971 as Triad Systems by Henry M. Gay, William W. Stevens and Donald J. Ruder. It was incorporated in 1972. The company installed its first system at Northgate Auto Parts in Mill Valley, California, on July 7, 1973. It retained the Triad name until 2003.

=== Automotive aftermarket ===
Prior to automation, the automotive aftermarket—involving the distribution of automotive replacement parts—used 3x5 index cards for inventory control. The founders of Activant created a computer, the Series 10, that used new, cost-effective disk drives to store the inventory information for the automotive parts distributors. The Series 10 gave the automotive parts distributors, also known as jobbers, inventory control. It was offered at $50,000–100,000 per unit.

In the 1980s, the Series 10 was followed by the faster Series 12. The increased storage capacity of the Series 12 enabled Triad to offer customers the first computer based parts catalog, eliminating the racks of parts catalogs used in auto parts retailers. The company also created a system for larger warehouse distributors, the Triad 80. These systems helped enable communication capabilities between jobbers and warehouse distributors and suppliers.

=== Expansion to new markets ===
In 1980, Francisco Ramiro Diaz, Activant's founder, observed that the hardlines market had similar inventory management and accounts receivable requirements as jobbers and warehouse distributors. To cater to the hardware retailers, the company created a point-of-sale (POS) cash terminal system. In 1984, the company modified the POS system to serve lumberyards.

By 1984, Activant (then Triad) launched the first electronic parts catalog (simply called Electronic Catalog) paper catalogs, and by 1990, provided customers with more than 8.8 million automobile parts available electronically. In 1987, the company began selling a stand-alone Electronic Catalog on CD-Rom (renamed as Triad LaserCat) to smaller automotive jobbers who did not have a Triad system. In 1989, the company began to develop the Triad Prism system as a future replacement for the Series 12 for the automotive aftermarket. The system for the hardlines and lumber industry was upgraded, including a new UNIX operating system, and became Triad Eagle by 1992.

==== Activant Vista ====
In 1993, Triad released Triad Vista, a product movement service which compiled monthly point-of-sale movement reports and showed how products performed against their competition and in the market in general. Vista brought in over $12 million annually.

In the mid-1990s, Triad acquired assets from the companies of Gemini, CSD, Eclipse, and Ultimate to aid the company in the lumber and automotive industries. The Radio Frequency (RF) Suite was also launched during the mid-1990s, with RF-enabled barcode scanning.

The company launched Triad Eagle for Windows in 1997.

By 1997, CCI purchased Triad. Glen Staats became CEO of CCITRIAD. One year later, the owners of the company, Hicks, Muse, Tate and Furst brought in a new CEO, Mike Aviles, to replace Staats. Aviles was CEO from late 1999–2004. Over the next five years, the company's customer base continued to expand and entered into partnerships with TrueValue, ACE, and Do It Best hardware stores.

==== 21st century ====
In 2003, the company changed its name from CCITRIAD to Activant Solutions Inc. In 2004, the board of directors brought in Larry Jones as CEO to drive an aggressive growth strategy. Pervez Qureshi, current president and CEO, took over in May 2006.

Activant purchased Speedware Corporation Inc., including its operating divisions, Enterprise Computer Systems (ECS) Inc., Prelude Systems Inc., OpenERP Solutions and Speedware Ltd., in 2005. That same year Activant acquired The Systems House Inc., a technology company for distributors primarily in the automotive aftermarket and office products industries, and Prophet 21, which aided Activant in the wholesale distribution market.

In May 2006, Activant was purchased by the private equity firms Hellman & Friedman, Thoma Cressey, and JMI Equity.

In 2007, Activant acquired Silk Systems Inc., including its wholly owned subsidiary Silk Dimensions Systems Inc., a software company for the Canadian home improvement, wholesale distribution and building materials markets. This was followed by the acquisition of Intuit Eclipse Distribution Management Solutions Business, an enterprise software provider in wholesale distribution.
