= Bruce Johnston (disambiguation) =

Bruce Johnston (born 1942) is an American musician and singer-songwriter.

Bruce Johnston may refer to:

- Bruce Johnston (criminal) (1939–2002), American gang leader

== See also ==
- Bruce Johnstone (disambiguation)
- Bruce Johnson (disambiguation)
