= Entellium =

- Type: Private (defunct)
- Industry: On-demand software
- Founded: Kuala Lumpur, Malaysia 2000
- Headquarters: Seattle, Washington
- Key people: Paul Johnston
- Products: Rave, eSalesForce, eCustomerCenter
- Website: www.entellium.com

Entellium was a U.S. software company that developed on-demand customer relationship management (CRM) software for small and midsize businesses. It was sold to Intuit in bankruptcy court, but as of October 2009, Intuit was reportedly not using the software.

== Company description ==
Entellium was founded in Kuala Lumpur, Malaysia, in May 2000 by Paul Johnston, a former Apple sales executive. The company moved its headquarters to Seattle, Washington, in 2003 but maintained a research and development office in Kuala Lumpur.

== Wire fraud scandal ==
On October 7, 2008, Paul Thomas Johnston, the former chief executive officer (CEO) of Seattle-based Entellium Corp., and Parrish L. Jones, the former chief financial officer (CFO), were arrested and charged with wire fraud for lying to investors in U.S. District Court in Seattle.

According to the FBI, the two software executives “devised a scheme to defraud investors in the company by representing that company revenues far exceeded the actual figures.”

The government alleges that actual 2006 revenues were $582,789 but the pair inflated the revenues to nearly $4 million; actual 2007 revenues were $1.4 million inflated to $6.2 million; and actual 2008 revenues were $1.7 million inflated to $5.2 million.

The false revenue numbers, according to the government, were used by the pair to attract millions of dollars in private investment, including $19 million from Ignition Partners, of Bellevue. Two Ignition partners told government investigators that they never would have made such an investment had they known the actual revenue figures.

Forty Entellium staff were laid off after the arrests.

== Bankruptcy ==
On December 2, 2008, Entellium filed for Chapter 11 bankruptcy protection, paving the way for some assets to be sold to financial software maker Intuit.

== Products ==
Entellium's products include two customer relationship management applications and an issue tracking system:

- Rave, a smart client CRM application built on the Windows Presentation Foundation
- eSalesForce, a web-based CRM application built on the ASP.NET Framework
- eCustomerCenter, a web-based issue tracking system

== Gamer-influenced design ==
In building its Rave product, Entellium used gamer-influenced design (GID), a concept that incorporates video-game features into business software. Rave includes the following GID features:

- Star rankings associated with prospects and opportunities
- Animated effects
- Contextual activity sets
- Contact database
- Custom user profiles
- User performance ranking
