= MRI Software =

American technology company

MRI Software, LLC
- Company type: Private
- Industry: Software; Cloud computing Professional Services
- Founded: 1971; 55 years ago
- Headquarters: Cleveland, Ohio, USA
- Products: Property Management Software; Real Estate Accounting Software; Investment Management Software
- Number of employees: 3,000
- Website: www.mrisoftware.com

MRI Software, LLC is a provider of real estate and investment management software to real estate owners, investors, and operators. The company was founded in 1971 under the name Management Reports Incorporated and was later known as Management Reports International and, once acquired by Intuit in 2002, Intuit Real Estate Solutions (IRES). In 2009, the private equity firm based in San Francisco, Vista Equity Partners, acquired IRES and renamed the company MRI Software. In 2015, MRI Software was acquired by private equity firm GI Partners. In 2017, MRI received additional strategic investment from TA Associates. In 2020, Harvest Partners, LP, made a strategic investment in MRI, joining existing investors TA Associates and GI Partners.

MRI Software is headquartered in Solon, Ohio, with a total of ten offices in North America. The company has six offices in the EMEA region and four in APAC, including Hong Kong and Singapore.

== Products ==
MRI Software offers property management and accounting software for multi-family residential and commercial property, retail, office, Strata and Body Corporate and corporate real estate applications.

- Automation in the areas of financial operations, budgeting, forecasting, facility management, general ledger, job costing, reporting, accounts payable;
- Strategic planning for investment analysis, portfolio analysis, fund and asset modeling;
- Commercial management, lease accounting, operations, financials, advanced retail and lease work flow;
- Compliance management for affordable housing, public housing, section 8 voucher management, waitlist management, asset management.
