= Warehouse control system =

A warehouse control system (WCS) is a software application that directs the real-time activities within warehouses and distribution centers (DC). As the “traffic cop” for the warehouse/distribution center, the WCS is responsible for keeping everything running smoothly, maximizing the efficiency of the material handling subsystems and often, the activities of the warehouse associates themselves. It provides a uniform interface to a broad range of material handling equipment such as AS/RS, carousels, conveyor systems, sorters, palletizers, etc. The primary functions of a WCS include:

- Interfacing to an upper level host system/warehouse management system (WMS) and exchanging information required to manage the daily operations of the distribution center.
- Allocating work to the various material handling sub-systems to balance system activity to complete the requested workload.
- Providing real-time directives to operators and material handling equipment controllers to accomplish the order fulfillment and product routing requirements.
- Dynamically assign cartons to divert locations based on defined sortation algorithms or based on routing/order information received from the Host (if applicable).
- Generate result data files for reporting and/or upload by the Host system.
- Operational screens (graphical user interface) and functions to facilitate efficient control and management of the distribution warehouse.
- Collect statistical data on the operational performance of the system to enable operations personnel to maintain the equipment in peak performance.

Each major function is designed to work as part of an integrated process to effectively link the host systems with the lower level control system, while relieving the Host from the real-time requirements such as operator screens and lower level equipment control interfaces.

== Control hierarchy ==
The typical warehouse/distribution center consists of a multi-tier control architecture in which each level in the control hierarchy has a defined role.

The upper most level of the control hierarchy is the warehouse management system (WMS), or host. This system handles the business aspects of the system such as receiving customer orders, allocating inventory, and generating shipping manifests or bills of lading) and invoices based on order fulfillment information and shipping information received from the material handling control system (WCS). It typically interacts with the material handling system on a non-real-time basis.

Coordinating the activities of the various material handling sub-systems is the role of the warehouse control system (WCS). The WCS directs the "real-time" data management and interface responsibilities of the material handling system as well as provides common user interface screens for monitoring, control, and diagnostics. As the focal point for managing the operational aspects of the material handling system, the WCS provides the critical link between the non-real time based host and the real-time MHE control system. It receives information from the upper level Host and coordinates the various real-time control devices (conveyors, print and apply applicators, etc.) to accomplish the daily workload. At each decision point, the WCS determines the most efficient routing of the product and transmits directives to the equipment controllers to achieve the desired result. At the lowest level, closest to the physical equipment, are the equipment controller(s). These controllers are typically some form of a programmable logic controller (PLC) or a dedicated, real-time PC control system. They interface to peripheral Input/Output (I/O) devices such as photo-eyes scanners, motors, etc. as well as data collection devices such as bar code scanners (barcode reader) and weigh scales and are responsible for the physical operation of the material handling equipment. The equipment controllers are also responsible for the physical handling of product and tracking it from point-to-point based on the direction from the upper level control systems. Typically a single controller is only concerned with the operations of a defined area or sub-system of the overall material handling system.

Ultimately, the control hierarchy within the distribution center reflects the organizational structure of their human counterparts. The management staff (or the WMS) determines the workload to be accomplished for the day while the supervisory staff (WCS) oversees the real-time activities of the warehouse associates (equipment controllers) to complete the daily activities. Each warehouse associate is assigned a specific task based on their area of expertise (order selection – carousel/Pick To Light, transportation - conveyors, etc.). As each operator completes their individual assignment, the supervisor (WCS) assigns the next task based on the current workload. As orders are completed, the (WCS) supervisor reports back to (WMS) management the status of the orders along with any pertinent order information.

== Best practice ==
- Have one WCS in your distribution center
- Design a lean interface between WCS and WMS
- Define responsibilities between WCS and WMS (who owns the inventory?)

== See also ==
- Document automation for Supply Chain and Logistics
- Enterprise resource planning (ERP)
- Inventory management software
- Manufacturing resource planning
- Warehouse management system
- Warehouse execution system
