= Scott Cook =

American businessman

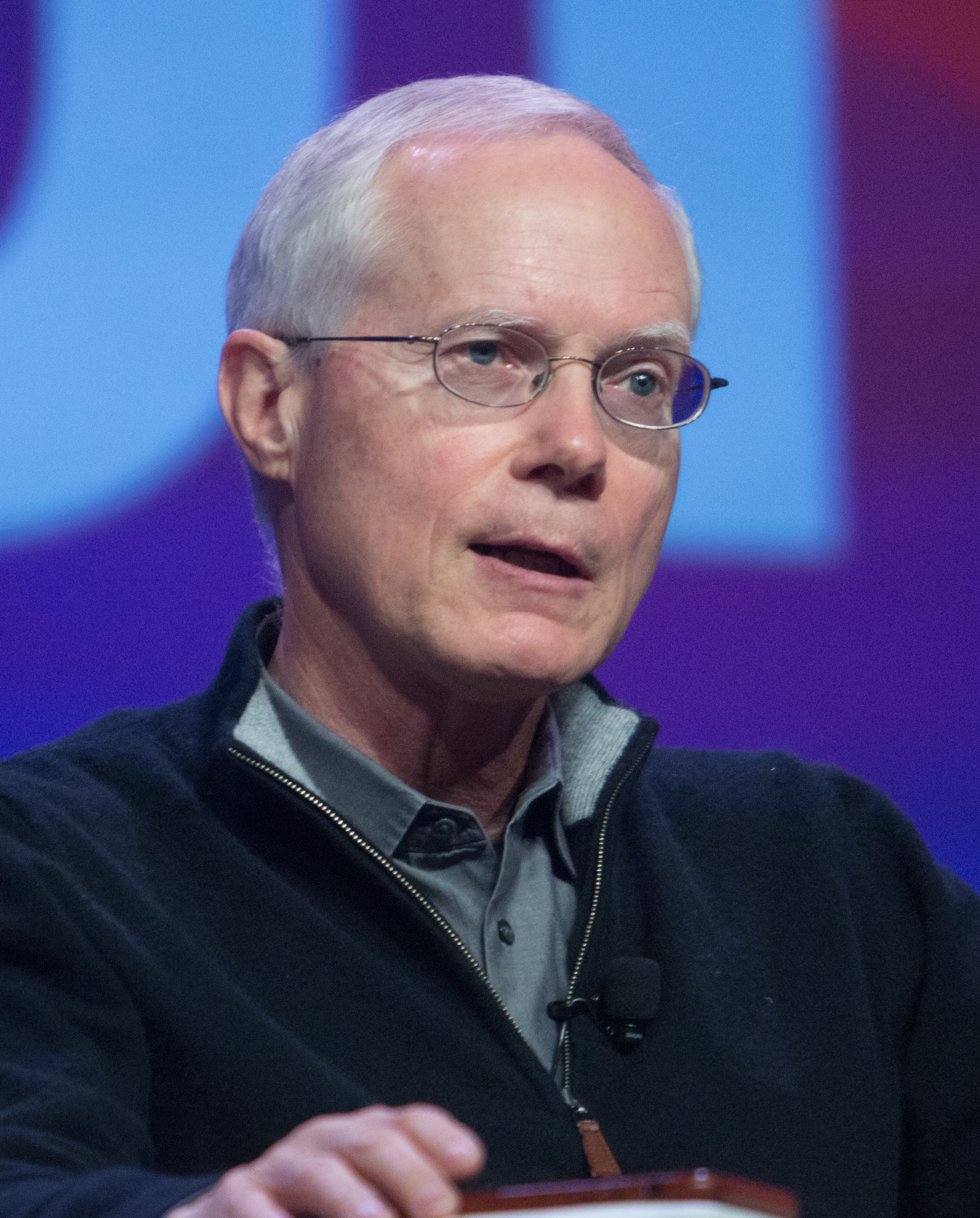
- Cook in 2017
- Born: Scott David Cook; 1952 (age 73–74)
- Occupation: Businessman
- Known for: Co-founder of Intuit
- Title: Chair of the executive committee, Intuit
- Board member of: eBay; Procter & Gamble
- Spouse: Signe Ostby
- Children: 3, including Karl

Scott David Cook (born 1952) is an American billionaire businessman who co-founded Intuit. Cook is also a director of eBay and Procter & Gamble.

== Early life ==
Cook holds a bachelor's degree in economics and mathematics from the University of Southern California and an MBA from Harvard Business School (1976), where he serves on the dean's advisory board.

== Career ==
Cook started his career at Procter & Gamble in Cincinnati, Ohio, where he learned about product development, market research, and marketing. He then took a job in strategic consulting at Bain & Company in Menlo Park, California. Cook soon began using the insights he was learning there to look for an idea for a company of his own. That idea came to him one day when his wife was complaining about paying the bills. With personal computers just coming out at the time, Scott thought there might be a market for basic software that would help people pay their bills. He launched Quicken and named his company Intuit in 1983, which today offers software and online products to help individuals and small companies manage their finances.

He was Intuit's chairman from February 1993 to July 1998. From April 1983 to April 1994, he served as president and CEO of Intuit.

In 2002, Cook and his wife, Signe Ostby, established the Center for Brand and Product Management at the University of Wisconsin–Madison School of Business, the nation's first university-based center focused exclusively on training MBAs in brand and product management. Cook and Ostby both started their careers in brand management.

In 2005, Cook was No. 320 on the Forbes 400, with a net worth of $1.1 billion. Since the 1990s, he has "more than doubled his donations to Republicans and Democrats, giving the maximum [in 2007] to mainstream politicians such as Mitt Romney and Harry Reid."

Cook also appears in the directory of Peter Thiel's Dialog organization.

== Personal life ==
Cook is married to Signe Ostby. Ostby worked for Procter & Gamble and Clorox before she launched Software Publishing Corporation, making productivity software for personal computers. They have three children, including show jumper Karl Cook, and live in Woodside, California.

Scott and Signe founded and are trustees of their $348 million family foundation, Valhalla, which funds early childhood development, K12 education, medical research and talent, environmental innovation, data literacy, and collaborative philanthropy.

The Cook family owns and manages a ranch that both raises livestock for local restaurant trade, and breeds, raises, sells, and trains show jumping horses from stallions and mares chosen from European bloodlines.
