= W. Bruce Johnson =

American businessman

- Education: Duke University
- Occupation: Former CEO of Sears
- Known for: CEO of Sears Holdings Corporation

W. Bruce Johnson is the former interim President and CEO of Sears Holdings Corporation, the parent of Sears and Kmart, from January 2008 to February 2011. Johnson served on the board of directors for Sears Holdings Corporation from May 2010 until May 2011. From July 2012 until August 2015 he served as president and CEO of Sears Hometown and Outlet Stores, Inc. Johnson served on the board of directors for Sears Hometown and Outlet Stores, Inc. from July 2012 through May 2015.

== Early life and career ==
Johnson received his BA, MBA, and JD from Duke University.

Johnson worked at Booz Allen & Hamilton and Arthur Andersen. He then spent 16 years at Colgate-Palmolive. Johnson then joined Carrefour, where he was Director, Organization and Systems. In 2003, he joined Kmart as Senior Vice President, Supply Chain and Operations. Following the merger with Sears, he took on the same responsibilities for the entire company. He was eventually appointed interim President and CEO in January 2008.

Media offices
Preceded by Aylwin Lewis	CEO of Sears Holdings; January 2008 – February 2011	Succeeded by Herman Darling
