= Bruce Johnson (Canadian executive) =

Bruce Johnson co-founded a Canadian personal income tax software company named WinTax in 1992 with fellow University of Alberta graduate Chad Frederick. Johnson grew up in England. He earned his Computing Science degree from the University of Alberta in 1983.

Later, WinTax was acquired by Chipsoft, which in turn was acquired by Intuit Inc., becoming Intuit Canada. Johnson became CEO of Intuit Canada (and the associated UK operations) during his time with the company. He left his position as CEO in 2004, and has since ventured into several local technology start-ups.

Around 2008, Johnson became involved with Baby Gourmet and helped with funding and recruiting executives for the company.

In 2009, he was named to the advisory board of Bean Services, a Vancouver, BC-based developer of accounts payable automation software.
