= Wave picking =

Process in warehouse management

Wave picking is used to support management and workers via a warehouse management system (WMS) in several ways, to support the planning and organizing of the daily flow of work of a warehouse or distribution center. Wave picking is an application of short-interval-scheduling. Managers, using a WMS, may assign groups of orders into short intervals called "waves", to initially simulate the flow for the day, consistent with the order departure plan and available labor. When the plan is satisfactory, it is accepted. The WMS will then release the waves to the warehouse sequentially throughout the day, to allow managers to coordinate the several parallel and sequential activities required to complete the daily work plan. One of the objectives of wave picking is to minimize the variation of workload in each work function by wave. The wave planning data includes the workload (order lines, cases, each items, value added services, etc.) by order or function (case picking, repack picking, pallet movement, pick position replenishment, packing, etc.), providing management the information to calculate staff requirements (Reasonable Expectancies or Productivity Standards) to guide the assignment of staff by function, with the reasonable expectation that the work in each function, within each wave. Waves are often constructed (based on each day's order characteristics and available staffing) to last between 1 and 4 hours, with resulting 8 to 2 waves in a shift.

There are three basic management tasks accomplished and benefits of wave picking.

1. To organize the sequence of orders and their assignment to waves, consistent with routing, loading and planned departure times of shipping vehicles or production requirements, etc., and therefore to reduce the staging space required for shipping dock handling to assemble orders, load and ship;
2. To assign staff to each wave and function within each wave, with the expectation that all the work assigned to each wave will be completed at approximately the same time, within the wave period, providing management with the ability to monitor and manage performance throughout the day, responding in a timely way to problems that occur, and more effectively utilize the staffing throughout the shift; and
3. To support management control, before and during a work shift, to achieve the daily plan and react in a timely way, and measure and report the results.

Material handling methods and equipment are independent of waving. Each set of methods (e.g., order picking, batch picking, bulk picking) and equipment (e.g., conveyor and sorter, ASRS, order picker, pallet jack, forklift) will yield a different expected productivity rate for management to use in determining the number of staff-hours to assign to each function by wave.

Additional benefits of wave picking include the improved ability to

1. measure productivity within a function;
2. estimate staff required;
3. estimate the throughput capacity based on staffing levels;
4. evaluate the impact of changes in methods and equipment by function;
5. provide feedback regarding performance; and
6. better understand the nature of the workload as it changes seasonally, as a consequence of demand, and as a consequence of sales efforts and marketing campaigns.

== Other picking strategies ==
- Batch picking method
- Zone picking method
- Cluster picking
- Discrete order picking
- Piece picking

== See also ==
- Document automation
- Picking strategies
