= Order processing =

Work-flow to fulfil an order

Order processing is the process or work-flow associated with the picking, packing, and delivery of the packed items to a shipping carrier and is a key element of order fulfillment. Order processing operations or facilities are commonly called “distribution centers” or “DC 's”. There are wide variances in the level of automation associating to the “pick-pack-and-ship” process, ranging from completely manual and paper-driven to highly automated and completely mechanized; computer systems overseeing this process are generally referred to as Warehouse Management Systems or “WMS”.

== Process ==
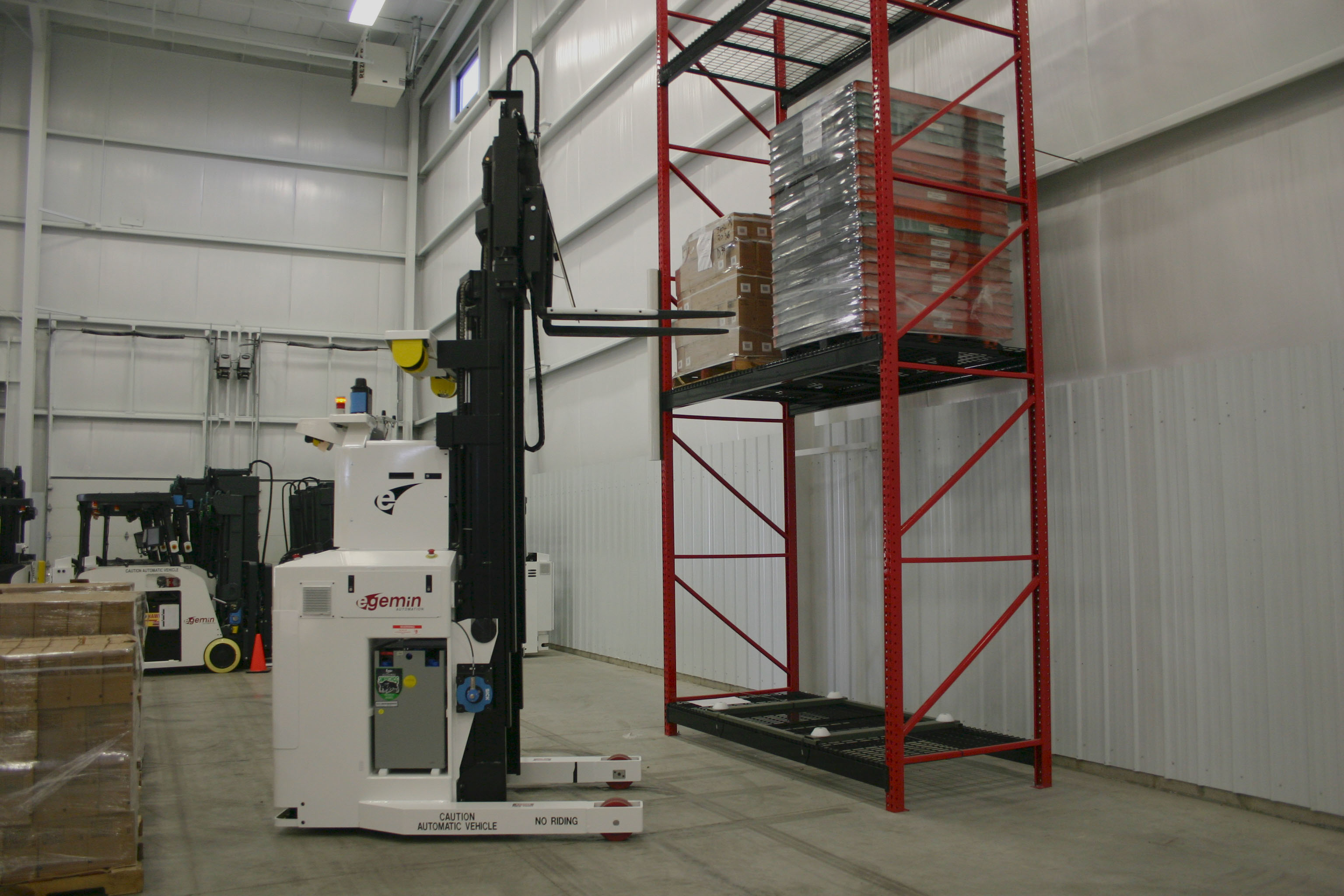
Automated picking

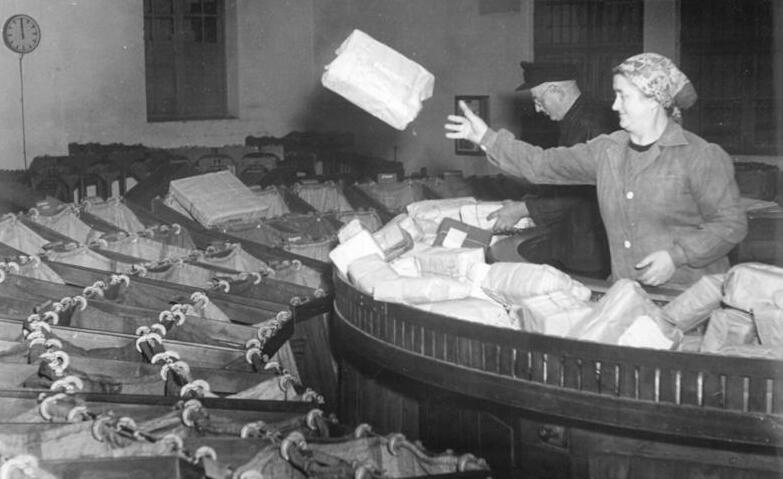
Sorting packages according to destination

Order processing is a sequential process involving:

- Picking: consists in taking and collecting articles in a specified quantity before shipment to satisfy customers' orders.
- Sorting: process that separates items according to destination.
- Pre-consolidation or package formation: includes weighting, labeling and packing.
- Consolidation: gathering packages into loading units for transportation, control and bill of lading.

== Picking ==
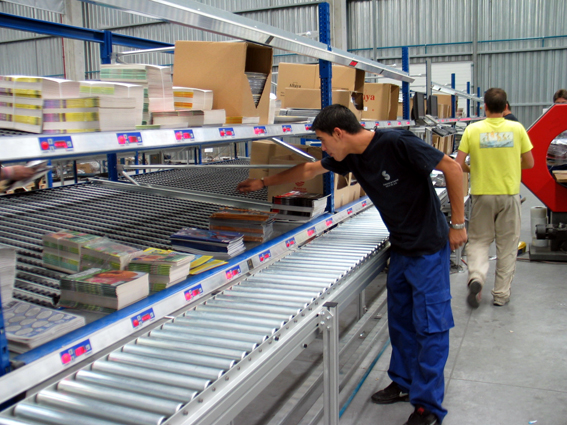
Person to goods picking assisted by conveyor belt

Order picking or order preparation is one of a logistic warehouse's processes. It consists in taking and collecting articles in a specified quantity before shipment to fulfil customer orders. It is a basic warehousing process and has an important influence on logistic processes.

It is one of the warehouse management system functions.

=== Picking Strategies ===
There are several strategies for order picking, including:

- Piece picking or picker to part method: the order picker(s) move(s) to collect the products necessary for one order. This is commonly seen in distribution centers for retail chains, whereby a shop will require a great many replenishment goods. A picker may pick all or part of the replenishment for one shop.
- Zone picking method: each order picker is assigned to one specific zone and will only realize order picking within this zone. For instance, in an electrical retail environment, both small and large items may be required and a picker on an electric vehicle such as a powered pallet truck (PPT) or an order picker vehicle may pick large and heavy items whereas a foot picker may pick small and light ones from another part of the warehouse. The two picks are eventually collated.
- Batch picking method: order pickers move to collect the products necessary for several orders at one time through the most efficient route in the warehouse.
- Wave picking method: Wave picking is the combination of zone and batch picking, where batches of orders are passed from picker to picker through separate zones.
- Sorting systems method: no movement of the order picker(s), the products are brought to her or him by an automatic system (conveyor system, automatic storage ...).
- Pick to box method: same strategy as piece picking above, but when product is picked, it is placed directly into a mailing-ready container, removing the need for any interim repackaging for mailing / transit purposes. This method requires what is sometimes referred to as a “cartonization” step, where the warehouse management system (WMS) figures out before the pick is started how many boxes will be required (and what size) so that the picker goes out to the warehouse with the correct boxes already in hand.

Note that these strategies are not mutually exclusive to each other. For example, wave picking can be used to batch picks, which are then handled via zone or piece picking. A warehouse may also need to support alternate picking strategies due to physical layout or product distribution; for example, if some products are only sold by pallet and require special lifting equipment, those pallet-orders might be batched or processed differently that the rest of the products which might be piece-picked — alternatively, part of a warehouse might be automated with sorting systems while another part is not.

=== Piece Picking ===
Piece picking, also known as broken case picking or pick/pack operations, describes systems where individual items are picked. Operations using piece picking typically have a large stock keeping unit, or SKU, base in the thousands or tens of thousands of items, small quantities per pick, and short cycle times. Examples of piece pick operations include mail-order catalog companies and repair parts distributors.

=== Case Picking ===
Operations that use case picking tend to have less diversity in product characteristics than operations that use piece picking. There are typically fewer SKUs and higher picks per SKU.

=== Pallet Picking ===
Full-pallet picking, or unit-load picking, uses much simpler systematic methods than piece picking or case picking. However, there are many choices in storage equipment, storage configurations and types of lift trucks.

== Sorting ==
Sorting machines in distribution

== Pick and pack ==
Pick and pack is a part of a complete supply chain management process that is commonly used in the retail distribution of goods. It entails processing small to large quantities of product, often truck or train loads and disassembling them, picking the relevant product for each destination and re-packaging with shipping label affixed and invoice included. Usual service includes obtaining a fair rate of shipping from common, as well as expediting truck carriers. Pick and Pack services are offered by many businesses that specialize in supply chain management solutions. Case picking is the gathering of full cartons or boxes of product. This is often done on a pallet. In the consumer products industry, case picking large quantities of cartons is frequently an entry-level employee's task. There is, however, significant skill required to make a good pallet load of product. Key requirements are that cartons not be damaged, they make good use of the available cube (space) and be quick to assemble.

Warehouse management system products create pick paths to minimize the travel distance of an order selector, but typically neglect the need to maximize the use of cube, segregate products that should not touch or minimize damage.

== Factors ==
The specific "order fulfillment process" or the operational procedures of distribution centers are determined by many factors. Each distribution center has its own unique requirements or priorities. There is no "one size fits all" process that universally provides the most efficient operation. Some of the factors that determine the specific process flow of a distribution center are:

- The nature of the shipped product — shipping eggs and shipping shirts can require differing fulfillment processes
- The nature of the orders — the number of differing items and quantities of each item in orders
- The nature of the shipping packaging — cases, totes, envelopes, pallets can create process variations
- Shipping costs — consolidation of orders, shipping pre-sort can change processing operations
- Availability and cost and productivity of workforce — can create trade-off decisions in automation and manual processing operations
- Timeliness of shipment windows — when shipments need to be completed based on carriers can create processing variations
- Availability of capital expenditure dollars — influence on manual versus automated process decisions and longer-term benefits
- Value of product shipped — the ratio of the value of the shipped product and the order fulfillment cost
- Seasonality variations in outbound volume — amount and duration of seasonal peaks and valleys of outbound volume
- Predictability of future volume, product, and order profiles
- Predictability of distribution network — whether the network itself is going to change
- Presence of small volume distribution
- Minimization of shipping costs

This list is only a small sample of factors that can influence the choice of a distribution center's operational procedures. Because each factor has varying importance in each organization, the net effect is that each organization has unique processing requirements.

The effect of globalization has immense impacts on much of the order fulfillment, but its impact is felt mostly in transportation and distribution.

== See also ==
- Counter-to-counter package
- Distribution center
- Document automation
- Shipping list
- Warehouse
- Warehouse management system
