= Intuit =

American financial software company

Intuit Inc.
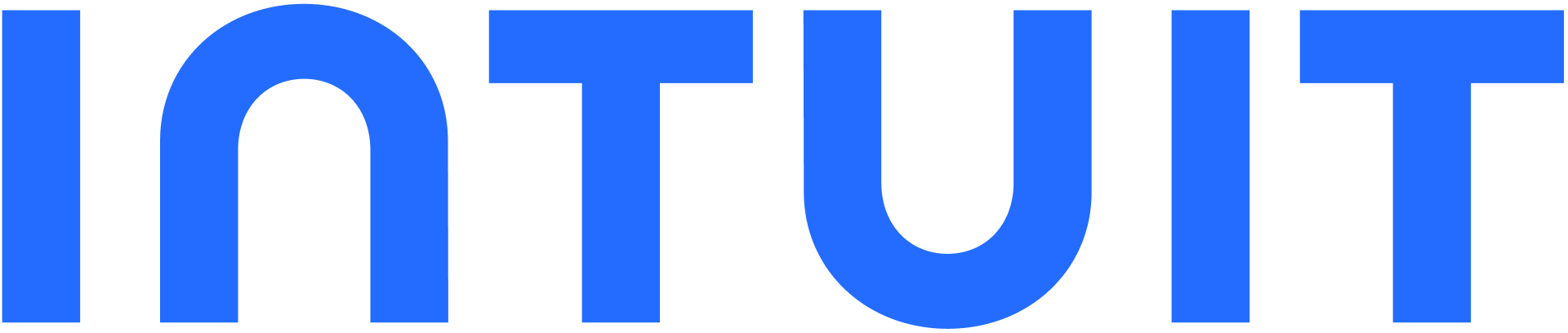

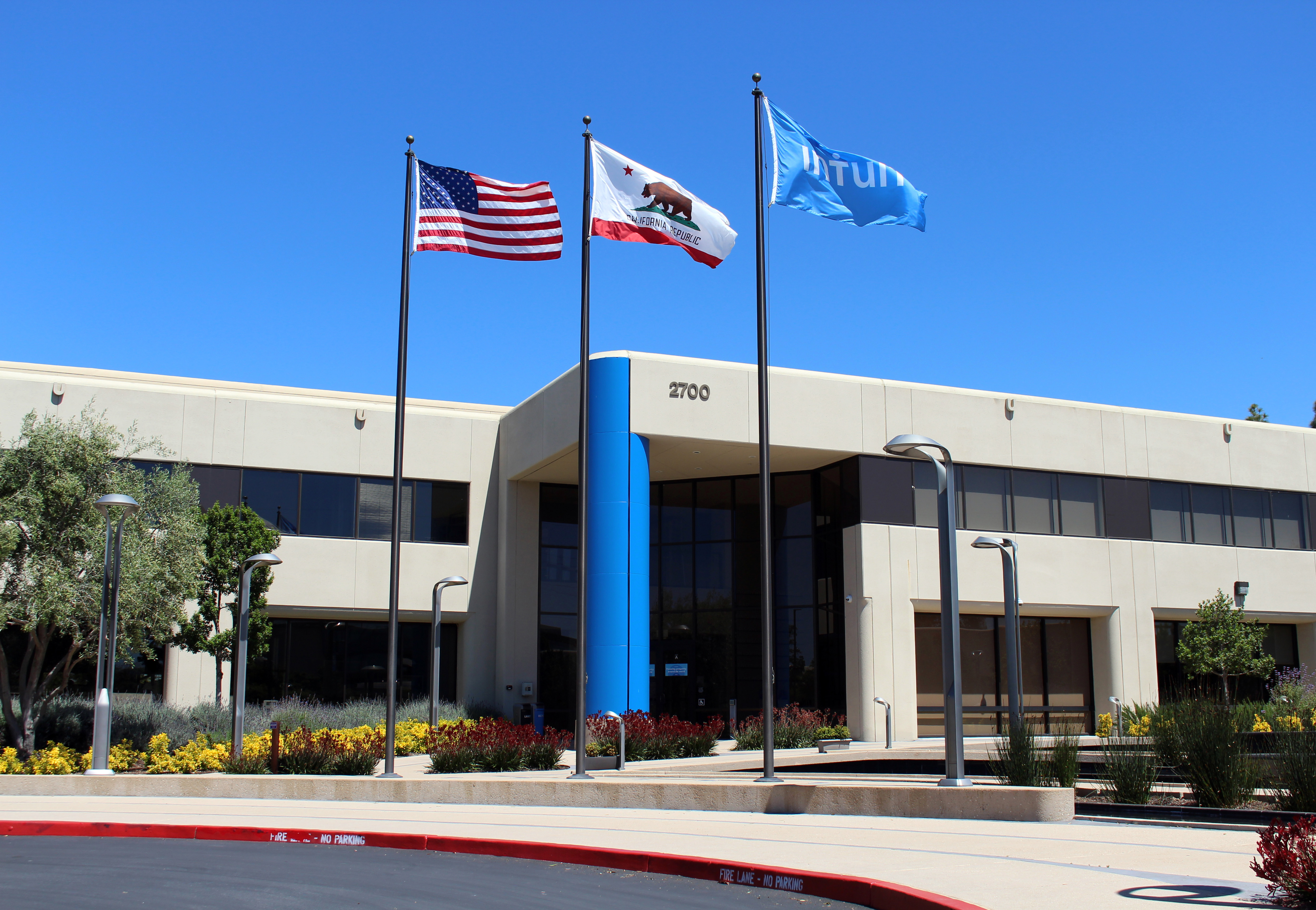
- Headquarters in Mountain View
- Type: Public
- Traded as: Nasdaq: INTU; Nasdaq-100 component; S&P 100 component; S&P 500 component
- ISIN: US4612021034
- Industry: Financial software
- Founded: 1983; 43 years ago, in Palo Alto, California, US
- Founders: Scott Cook; Tom Proulx
- Headquarters: Mountain View, California, US; 37°25′38″N 122°5′47″W
- Key people: Sasan Goodarzi (chair and CEO); Vasant Prabhu (lead independent director)
- Products: Credit Karma; Mailchimp; QuickBooks; TurboTax; ProConnect
- Services: Personal finance; Accounting software; Tax return software
- Revenue: ▲US$18.8 billion (2025)
- Operating income: ▲US$4.92 billion (2025)
- Net income: ▲US$3.87 billion (2025)
- Total assets: ▲US$36.9 billion (2025)
- Total equity: ▲US$19.7 billion (2025)
- Number of employees: 18,200 (2025)
- Website: intuit.com
- Footnotes; Financials as of July 31, 2025.

Intuit Inc. is an American financial technology company that develops financial software and services, including TurboTax and QuickBooks. Founded in 1983, the company is headquartered in Mountain View, California. It went public in 1993 and that year acquired ChipSoft, maker of TurboTax. The company later expanded with the acquisitions of Credit Karma (completed in December 2020) and Mailchimp (completed in November 2021).

Intuit has been the subject of reporting and regulatory actions related to US tax filing. In 2019, ProPublica investigations found that Intuit had steered eligible taxpayers from its free IRS Free File product toward its paid TurboTax Free Edition, including through search engine delisting and a discount marketed to members of the military. Intuit left the Free File Alliance after the 2021 filing season. Its marketing of "free" tax services led to a $141-million multi-state settlement in 2022 and, in 2024, a Federal Trade Commission (FTC) Opinion and Final Order limiting "free" claims unless eligibility is clearly disclosed. The order was vacated by the Fifth Circuit in March 2026 and remanded to the FTC. The company was also a defendant in the High-Tech Employee Antitrust Litigation, which it settled out of court.

Intuit has lobbied against IRS proposals to create a free, pre-filled tax filing system. Critics of Intuit's lobbying often note that such pre-filled systems are standard in many other developed nations.

== History ==
The company was founded in 1983 by Scott Cook and Tom Proulx in Palo Alto, California.

Scott Cook developed the concept for Intuit after his work at Procter & Gamble helped him realize that personal computers would lend themselves towards replacements for paper-and-pencil based personal accounting. While seeking a programmer, Cook met Tom Proulx at Stanford University. The two started Intuit, which initially operated out of a small room on University Avenue in Palo Alto. The first version of Quicken was coded in Microsoft's BASIC programming language for the IBM PC and UCSD Pascal for the Apple II by Tom Proulx and had to contend with a dozen serious competitors.

In 1991, Microsoft decided to produce a competitor to Quicken called Microsoft Money. To incentivize retailers, Intuit included a US$15 rebate coupon. Industry observers at the time noted this as a novel strategy for a software company. Around the same time, the company engaged John Doerr of Kleiner Perkins and diversified its product lineup.

On March 12, 1993, Intuit went public on the NASDAQ stock exchange under the ticker symbol INTU. The proceeds were used to make a key acquisition: the tax-preparation software company Chipsoft based in San Diego. Following the IPO, the company expanded its market share, leading to a 1994 buyout offer from Microsoft in 1994; at this time Intuit's market capitalization reached US$2 billion. However, the United States Department of Justice sued to block the acquisition.

As Microsoft competition intensified Intuit's Quicken business in the late 1990s, the company pivoted its strategy by developing web-based products while prioritizing QuickBooks for small business accounting and TurboTax for tax preparation—market segments where Microsoft faced less competition. The company made a number of investments around this time. Among others, it purchased a large stake in Excite and acquired Lacerte Software, a Dallas-based developer of tax preparation software used by tax professionals. It also divested its online bill payment service unit in exchange for an equity stake in CheckFree.

In June 2013, Intuit announced it would sell its financial services unit to private equity firm Thoma Bravo for $1.03 billion.

As of May 2018, Intuit had more than US$5 billion in annual revenue and a market capitalization of about US$50 billion. In August 2018, the company announced that Sasan Goodarzi would become Intuit's leader and CEO at the beginning of 2019. Former CEO Brad Smith remained as chairman of Intuit's board of directors. In August 2020, Intuit QuickBooks Canada was expected to reveal intentions to partner with Digital Main Street, as the company aims to help digitally turn Canadian small businesses.

In July 2024, Intuit announced it would lay off 1,800 employees, or 10% of its workforce, in order to refocus resources on generative AI initiatives. In May 2026, Intuit laid off a further 3000 employees, or 17% of its workforce, once again citing a need to streamline operations and focus on generative AI.

== Legal issues ==
Intuit formerly offered a free online service called TurboTax Free File as well as a similarly named service called TurboTax Free Edition, which is not free for most users. TurboTax Free File was developed as part of an agreement whereby members of the Free File Alliance would offer tax preparation for individuals below an income threshold for free in exchange for the IRS not providing taxpayers with free pre-filled forms. In 2019, investigations by ProPublica found that Intuit deliberately steered taxpayers from the free TurboTax Free File to the paid TurboTax Free Edition through deceptive practices, including search engine delisting and misleading discounts targeted at members of the military. Subsequent investigations by the Senate Committee on Homeland Security and Governmental Affairs and the New York State Department of Financial Services reached similar conclusions, the latter concluding that Intuit engaged in "unfair and abusive practices". As of 2022, Intuit is the subject of multiple lawsuits and is under investigation by the FTC and several state attorneys general. On May 4, 2022, Intuit agreed to pay a $141-million settlement over misleading advertisements.

== International operations ==
=== Canada ===
Intuit Canada ULC, an indirect wholly owned subsidiary of Intuit, is a developer of financial management and tax preparation software for personal finance and small business accounting. Services are delivered on a variety of platforms including application software, software connected to services, software as a service, platform as a service and mobile applications. Intuit Canada has employees located all across Canada, with offices in Edmonton, Alberta, and Toronto, Ontario.

Intuit Canada traces its origins to the 1993 acquisition by Intuit of a Canadian tax preparation software developer. In 1992, Edmontonians and University of Alberta graduates Bruce Johnson and Chad Frederick had built a tax preparation product called WINTAX – Canada's first Microsoft Windows-based personal tax preparation software. In 1993, they agreed to be acquired by Chipsoft, manufacturer of the US personal income tax software TurboTax. Shortly after the WINTAX acquisition, Chipsoft agreed to merge with Intuit, the developer of the Quicken financial software. Intuit Canada continued to update and support the WINTAX software, which was renamed QuickTax in 1995 and then renamed TurboTax in 2010. Intuit Canada quickly became the hub for international development at Intuit, producing localized versions of Quicken and QuickBooks for Canada (in French and English) and the United Kingdom. The UK version of Quicken was discontinued in 2005.

==== Current products of Intuit Canada ====
- TurboTax (formerly QuickTax) – offered in Basic, Standard, Premier, and Home & Business versions, as well as TurboTax 20 for preparing multiple returns.
- TurboImpôt (formerly ImpôtRapide) – French-language version of TurboTax – offered in de base, de luxe, premier and particuliers et entreprises versions.
- TurboTax online – Online versions of Free, Student, Standard, Premier and Home & Business.
- TurboImpôt en ligne (formerly ImpôtRapide en ligne) – Online versions of TurboImpôt gratuit, étudiant, de luxe, premier and particuliers et entreprises.
- SnapTax – an iPhone app that allows users to complete their income tax return on their iPhone
- TurboTax Refund Calculator – an iPad app that estimates tax returns and illustrates how changes, such as having a baby, can impact your income tax return
- QuickBooks – Small business accounting and financial management software, offered in EasyStart, Pro and Premier versions.
- QuickBooks Payroll Solutions – extends QuickBooks Pro and Premier into an in-house payroll.
- Intuit Merchant Service for QuickBooks – lets you process credit and debit transactions directly in any version of QuickBooks.
- QuickBooks Enterprise Solutions – for midsized companies that require more capacity, functionality and support than is offered by traditional small business accounting software; includes QuickBooks Payroll.
- QuickBooks Online – an online small business accounting and financial management software, offered in EasyStart, Essentials, and Plus versions.
- Intuit GoPayment – process and receive payments on the go through your mobile device.
- QuickBooks Succès PME – French-language version of QuickBooks, offered in Succès PME, Succès PME Pro, and Succès PME Premier versions
- QuickBooks Succès PME Service de paie – French-language version of the Payroll Solutions
- ProFile Basic and Premier Editions – Professional Tax Preparation Packages

==== Discontinued products of Intuit Canada ====
- TaxWiz – Tax preparation software – the company purchased in 2002, discontinued in 2007.
- WillExpert – A software package for preparing personal wills (for use within all of Canada with the exception of Quebec, due to specific provincial legislation).

In 2008, Intuit Canada discontinued the TaxWiz software and added QuickTax Basic to their lineup. Changes made by the Canada Revenue Agency forced Intuit and other tax preparing software companies to limit the number of returns available from their software to 20. This caused Intuit Canada to stop offering QuickTax Pro50 and Pro100 products, and it now offers QuickTax 20 as an alternative. Intuit Canada has since announced that for the 2010 tax year, it will discontinue use of the name QuickTax and replace it with the name TurboTax – thus bringing the product in line with Intuit's American tax-filing software.

=== India ===
Intuit India
- Type: Private
- Industry: Software company
- Founded: 2005; 21 years ago
- Founder: Scott Cook; Tom Proulx
- Headquarters: Bangalore, India
- Revenue: 2,993,000,000 United States dollar (2008)
- Operating income: 644,000,000 United States dollar (2008)
- Net income: 477,000,000 United States dollar (2008)
- Number of employees: 500+
- Website: www.intuit.com/in/

Intuit India is a fully owned subsidiary of Intuit, Inc.. Located in the southern city of Bangalore, the India office was started in April 2005. Currently it has more than 500 employees. It is one of the two development centers of Intuit outside the US, along with Intuit Canada.

A 26 July 2007 Techwhack article (among others) said Intuit-India would expand in international markets, including India, China, Russia, and Brazil. Nilesh Thakker, country manager for India, said there was huge opportunity in these nations. Intuit India is working on point-of-sale software for the Indian market and considering hosted versions of products in India, including online banking services for banks.

In Dec 2009, Intuit Inc. and Web 18's moneycontrol.com announced to provide Personal Finance Management Solutions in India and they signed a three-year partnership to provide a new financial management tool to Indian consumers on India's leading financial portal moneycontrol.com.

==== Intuit Money Manager ====
In January 2010, Intuit India released Intuit Money Manager, the company's first financial software product developed specifically for consumers in India. The web-based Intuit Money Manager is an innovative personal finance tool. This portal aggregated information from multiple bank accounts and credit card accounts. Once connected the portal tracked transactions across bank accounts, credit cards and loan transactions and balances through an interface.

Intuit Money Manager's beta version was launched through MoneyControl in the last week of August 2009. The product was then relaunched in Jan 2011 in partnership with ICICI Bank. In 2013, ICICI Bank replaced Intuit Money Manager with Yodlee's MoneyCenter which is branded as "My Money from ICICI".

==== Awards and recognition ====
- Intuit India has been ranked No.1 in the "India's Best Companies to Work For – 2017" list, and ranked No. 1 in the Information Technology category.
- It has also been recognized as one of the best companies in the Employee Wellness and Employer Branding categories (2017).

== Online communities ==
Intuit has had several online communities, some of which offer integration or cross-sells into its other products. These include the QuickBooks and TurboTax online communities for QuickBooks users and small business owners and tax payers respectively, Quicken Online Community for Quicken users and those who need help with the personal finances, and the Accountant Online Community and Jump Up. These communities have consisted of blogs, an expert locator map and event calendar, forums and discussion groups, podcasts, videocasts and webinars, and other user-created content.

JumpUp (formerly JackRabbit Beta) was a free social networking and resources site for small business owners and/or start-ups. Free tools and services included an interactive business planner, online training for developing a successful business plan, starting costs calculator, cash flow calculator, break-even calculator, templates for business planning and sample business plans.

TaxAlmanac was a free online tax research resource. The site included information including the Internal Revenue Code, Treasury Regulations, Tax Court Cases, and a variety of articles. This site was up for closure but due to massive feedback, has reminded up. It has however been archived since June 2014, meaning the existing content can be accessed and viewed but no new posts or comments can be made after this archival.

Modeled after English Wikipedia, TaxAlmanac was launched in May 2005. The June 6, 2005 edition of Time magazine featured an article entitled "It's a Wiki, Wiki World" about English Wikipedia in which TaxAlmanac was highlighted as "A Community of Customers". The November 21, 2005 edition of Business Week featured an article titled "50 Smart Ways to Use the Web" in which TaxAlmanac was selected as one of the 50. The product made the short list as one of the 7 in the collaboration category. Intuit archives TaxAlmanac effective June 1, 2014. Many of the users have migrated to a new site called TaxProTalk.com.

Zipingo was a free website where users could rate services such as contractors, restaurants, and other businesses. Ratings and comments were either entered from the website or through Quicken and QuickBooks. The site was closed by Intuit on August 23, 2007.

== Finances ==
For the fiscal year 2021, Intuit reported earnings of US$2.062 billion, with an annual revenue of US$9.633 billion, an increase of 25.4% over the previous fiscal cycle. Intuit's shares traded at over $498.18 per share and total international net revenue was less than 5% of total net revenue.

Year	Revenue in mil. US$	Net income in mil. US$	Total assets in mil. US$	Avg price per share in US$	Employees
2005	1,993	382	2,716	20.90	7,000
2006	2,293	417	2,770	27.15	7,500
2007	2,673	440	4,252	27.52	8,200
2008	2,993	477	4,667	25.51	8,200
2009	3,109	447	4,826	25.23	7,800
2010	3,403	574	5,198	36.26	7,700
2011	3,449	634	5,110	46.85	8,000
2012	3,808	792	4,684	54.68	8,500
2013	3,946	858	5,486	61.67	8,000
2014	4,243	907	5,201	77.91	8,000
2015	4,192	365	4,968	93.97	7,700
2016	4,694	979	4,250	104.02	7,900
2017	5,177	971	4,068	133.65	8,200
2018	5,964	1,211	5,178	194.12	8,900
2019	6,784	1,557	6,283	277.31	9,400
2020	7,679	1,826	10,931	286.29	10,600
2021	9,633	2,062	15,516	498.18	13,500
2022	12,726	2,066	27,734	423.03	17,300
2023	14,368	2,384	27,780	446.52	18,200
2024	16,285	2,963	32,132		18,800

== Acquisitions and carve-outs ==
=== 1990s ===
In 1993, Intuit acquired Chipsoft, a tax preparation software company based in San Diego.

In 1994, the firm acquired the tax preparation software division of Best Programs of Reston, VA. In the same year, Intuit acquired Parsons Technology from Bob Parsons for $64 million.

In 1996, it acquired GALT Technologies, Inc of Pittsburgh, PA.

In 1998, it acquired Lacerte Software Corp., which now operates as an Intuit subsidiary. The Lacerte subsidiary focuses on tax software used by professional accountants who prepare taxes for a living. It is generally used by larger firms with more complex workflows and clients.

On March 2, 1999, Intuit acquired Computing Resources Inc. of Reno, Nevada for approximately $200 million. This acquisition allowed Intuit to offer a payroll processing platform through its QuickBooks software program. In December 1999, Intuit purchased Rock Financial for a sum of $532M. The company was renamed Quicken Loans. In June 2002, Rock Financial founder Dan Gilbert led a small group of private investors in purchasing the Quicken Loans subsidiary back from Intuit.

=== 2000s ===
In 2001, Intuit invested in UK market, hiring a local management team led by Stephen Lee, managing director, and Neil Atkins, marketing director, with an aim to become Europe's leading B2B & B2C packaged accounts solution.

In 2002, the firm acquired Management Reports International, a Cleveland-based real estate management software firm. The firm was renamed Intuit Real Estate Solutions (IRES) and offers real estate management products for Windows and the web. In 2002, it acquired Eclipse ERP for $88 million, a real-time transaction processing accounting software used for order fulfillment, inventory control, accounting, purchasing, and sales

In 2003, it acquired 'Innovative Merchant Solutions' (IMS).a firm that provided merchant services to all types of businesses nationwide. The acquisition gave Intuit the ability to process credit cards through its core product, QuickBooks, without the need for hardware leasing. They can also provide traditional terminal-based credit card processing and downloading transactions directly into the QuickBooks software.

In November 2005, Intuit acquired MyCorporation.com, an online business document filing service, for $20 million from original founders Philip and Nellie Akalp.

In September 2006, it acquired StepUp Commerce, an online localized product listing syndicator, for $60 million in cash. In December 2006, it acquired Digital Insight, a provider of online banking services.

On August 17, 2007, Intuit sold Eclipse ERP to Activant, for $100.5 million in cash .

In December 2007, it acquired Electronic Clearing House to add check processing power.In December 2007, it acquired Homestead Technologies which offers web site creation and e-commerce tools targeted at the small business market, for $170 million.

In December 2008, it acquired Entellium, a by-then bankrupt software company that had developed on-demand customer relationship management software.

In April 2009, it acquired Boorah, a restaurant review site. On June 2, 2009, it announced the signing of a definitive agreement to purchase PayCycle Inc., an online payroll services, in an all-cash transaction for approximately $170 million. On September 14, 2009, Intuit Inc. agreed to acquire Mint.com, a free online personal finance service, for $170 million.

=== 2010s ===
On January 15, 2010, Intuit Inc. spun off Intuit Real Estate Solutions (which Intuit acquired in 2002) as a stand-alone company. The new company took on its previous moniker, and is now known as MRI Software.

On May 21, 2010, Intuit acquired MedFusion, a Cary, NC leader of Patient to Provider communications for approximately $91 million. On August 10, 2010, it. acquired the personal finance management app Cha-Ching. On June 28, 2011, it acquired the Web banking technology assets of Mobile Money Ventures, a mobile finance provider, for an undisclosed amount. This acquisition is expected to position Intuit as the largest online and mobile technology provider to financial institutions.

On May 18, 2012, it. acquired Demandforce, an automated small business marketing, and customer communications SaaS provider for approximately $423.5 million.

On August 15, 2012, it announced an agreement to sell its 'Grow Your Business' business unit to Endurance International. The sale included the Intuit Websites and Weblistings products which had been formed from the Homestead Technologies and StepUp Commerce acquisitions.

On July 1, 2013, it announced an agreement to sell its Intuit Financial Services (IFS) business unit (formerly known as Digital Insight) to Thoma Bravo for more than $1.03 billion. On August 19, 2013, it announced that it had sold its Intuit Health business unit (formerly known as MedFusion) back to MedFusion's founder, Steve Malik.

In August 2013, Intuit Inc. acquired tax planning software Good April for an undisclosed amount. On October 23, 2013, it acquired Level Up Analytics, a data consulting firm. On October 30, 2013, it acquired Full Slate, a developer of appointment scheduling software for small businesses. In November 2013, Intuit acquired Prestwick Services, LLC, and incorporated TruPay into its Employee Management Solutions Division.

In May 2014, Intuit Inc. bought Invitco to help bookkeepers put bill processing in the cloud. In May 2014, it acquired Check for approximately $360 million to offer bill pay across small business and personal finance products. In December 2014, it. acquired Acrede, UK-based provider of global, cross-border and cloud-based payroll services.

In March 2015, Intuit Inc. acquired Playbook HR.

In January 2016, Intuit Inc. announced an agreement to sell Demandforce to Internet Brands. On March 3, 2016, Intuit announced plans to sell Quicken to H.I.G. Capital. On March 8, 2016, it announced plans to sell Quickbase to private equity firm Welsh, Carson, Anderson & Stowe. In October 2016, Intuit acquired Bankstream to integrate direct bank feeds into QuickBooks.

On May 1, 2017, Intuit announced it was selling TruPay.

On December 5, 2017, Intuit announced its acquisition of TSheets, a time-tracking and scheduling software company, for $340 million to expand its small business management offerings.

=== 2020s ===
On February 24, 2020, Intuit CEO and leader Sasan Goodarzi announced that it planned to acquire Credit Karma for $7.1 billion. On August 3, 2020, Intuit announced its acquisition of TradeGecko for $100 million.

On September 13, 2021, Intuit announced its acquisition of Mailchimp for $12 billion.

In January 2024, Intuit integrated some of the functions of its personal accounting software Mint into Credit Karma's net worth product line and retired Mint.

== Lobbying ==
Intuit has lobbied extensively against the IRS providing taxpayers with free pre-filled forms, as is the norm in developed countries.

In 2009, the Los Angeles Times reported that Intuit spent nearly $2 million in political contributions to eliminate free online state tax filing for low-income residents in California. According to the New York Times, from 2009 to 2014, Intuit spent nearly $13 million lobbying, as reported by OpenSecrets, as much as Apple. Intuit spent $1 million on the race for the California state comptroller to support Tony Strickland, a Republican who opposed ReadyReturn, against John Chiang, a Democrat who supported ReadyRun (and won). Joseph Bankman, professor of tax law, Stanford Law School, and advocate of simplified filing, believes that the campaign warned politicians that if they supported free filing, Intuit would help their opponents.

On March 26, 2013, ProPublica reported that the company lobbied against return-free filing as recently as 2011. One year later, ProPublica reported that the company appeared to be linked to a number of op-eds and letters to Congress in a campaign advocating against direct tax filing backed by the Computer & Communications Industry Association, an advocacy organization of which Intuit is a member.

In October 2019, Propublica reported again that Intuit used "lobbying, the revolving door and dark pattern customer tricks" to fend off the US government's attempts to make tax filing free and easy, and created its multi-billion-dollar franchise.

== Lawsuits ==
An antitrust lawsuit and a class-action suit relating to cold calling employees of other companies were settled out of court along with Apple and Google.

In March 2015, The Washington Post and computer reporter Brian Krebs reported that two former employees alleged that Intuit knowingly allowed fraudulent returns to be processed on a massive scale as part of a revenue-boosting scheme. Both employees, former security team members for the company, stated that the company had ignored repeated warnings and suggestions on how to prevent fraud. One of the employees was reported to have filed a whistleblower complaint with the US Securities and Exchange Commission.

=== FTC Lawsuit Over Intuit's 'Free' Tax Filing Claims ===
The Federal Trade Commission (FTC) has taken legal action against Intuit Inc., the maker of TurboTax software, for deceptive advertising practices. They allege that Intuit's "free" tax filing claims are misleading, as they are not accessible to a significant number of taxpayers, including gig economy workers and those with farm income. To prevent further harm, the FTC has filed both an administrative complaint and a federal district court complaint, seeking to halt Intuit's deceptive advertising. The outcome of this legal action will determine the company's accountability in the matter. An FTC administrative law judge ruled in September 2023 that Intuit's advertising practices of free filing was deceptive and issued a cease-and-desist order to prevent Intuit from using that. The judge's decision was affirmed and finalized by January 2023.

Intuit appealed to the Fifth Circuit Court of Appeals, which heard the case in November 2024. The Fifth Circuit, in March 2026, ruled in favor of Intuit, citing the Supreme Court decision SEC v. Jarkesy (2024) to rule the FTC's determination of fault through an administrative law judge was unconstitutional. The Fifth Circuit vacated the FTC's ruling, and instead required the FTC to seek a jury trial to determine fault.

== Artificial intelligence ==
In 2025, Intuit announced a $100 million partnership with OpenAI to integrate its financial products—TurboTax, Credit Karma, QuickBooks, and Mailchimp—directly into ChatGPT, representing one of the largest enterprise adoptions of generative AI.

In early 2026, Intuit and Anthropic announced a multi-year partnership to bring custom AI agents to mid-market businesses on the Intuit platform using Claude, with experiences beginning to roll out in spring 2026.

In 2026, Intuit expanded its physical presence by opening nearly 600 offices and 20 TurboTax-branded storefronts, combining AI and machine learning capabilities with human tax expertise.

== See also ==
- Comparison of accounting software
