= Warehouse management system =

Software designed to support and optimize warehouse and distribution center management

A warehouse management system (WMS) is a set of policies and processes intended to organise the work of a warehouse or distribution centre, and ensure that such a facility can operate efficiently and meet its objectives. The core function of a warehouse management system is to record the arrival and departure of inventory. Software which fulfils this function can offer features like recording the precise location of stock within the warehouse, optimising the use of available space, or coordinating tasks for maximum efficiency.

In the 20th century, the term 'warehouse management information system' was often used to distinguish software that fulfils this function from theoretical systems. Some smaller facilities may use spreadsheets or physical media like pen and paper to document their processes and activities, and this too can be considered a WMS. However, in contemporary usage, the term overwhelmingly refers to computer systems.

== Levels of complexity ==
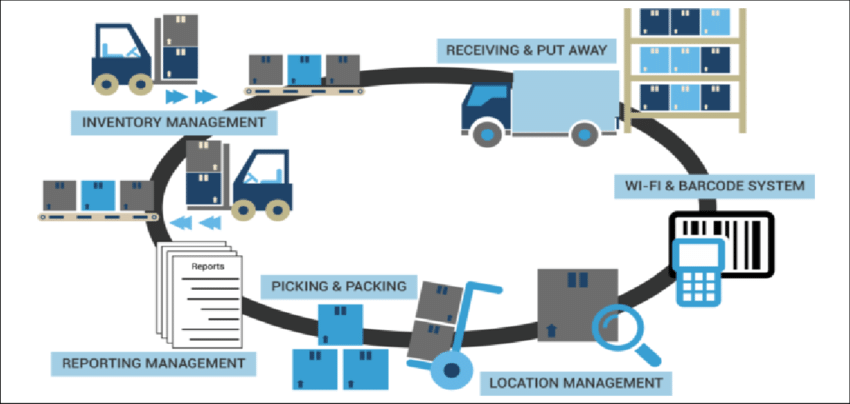
Some common features of an advanced WMS

More complex warehouse management systems tend to include specialised features designed for specific industries or types of facility, while legacy enterprise software vendors aim to offer as many of these features as possible in a ‘one-size-fits-all’ solution, which may be available as modules.

Academic research has made use of an approximate classification system based on 3 levels of complexity:

1. A basic WMS supports inventory management and location control. The performance data that can be produced at this level is generally limited to ‘throughput’, i.e.: how much stock moves through the warehouse in a given period of time. A basic WMS is almost indistinguishable from a basic Inventory Management System.
2. An advanced WMS can analyse capacity and stock levels, and perhaps track how much time and labour is spent on different activities. This allows it to generate data that measures efficiency and suggest ways to improve it. Outside of East Asia, Most WMS's in use today fall into this category. At this level, the duties of the WMS may begin to overlap with or supersede those of a Warehouse Control System or Warehouse Execution System.
3. A controlled WMS can exchange data with other systems, in order to take into account information from outside the warehouse (e.g.: manufacturing needs, customer orders, transportation) when planning activities, and vice versa. A key example of this is the integration with fleet digitalization platforms, where the WMS can receive real-time data about inbound and outbound trucks from their on-board GPS tracking units via API integrations. A controlled WMS may also obtain feedback from automation or IoT devices, and may continuously simulate or test strategies for improving operations, perhaps using machine learning.
4. An autonomous WMS can independently optimize warehouse operations using artificial intelligence, predictive analytics, and real-time automation. At this level, the system continuously evaluates inventory flow, labor allocation, equipment usage, and delivery schedules to make adaptive operational decisions with minimal human intervention. An autonomous WMS may integrate with robotic picking systems, autonomous mobile robots, digital twins, and cloud-based analytics platforms to improve efficiency and resilience. It can also predict disruptions, recommend corrective actions, and dynamically adjust workflows based on changing supply chain conditions.

== Types of installation and licensing ==
A WMS can either be hosted locally or installed on the cloud, allowing the WMS to be accessed from anywhere online. Local WMS software has historically been offered through a perpetual licence, giving organisations the permanent right to install it on their own on-premises servers, typically alongside a fixed period of updates and technical support which may be renewed at additional cost. As with many types of enterprise software, this provision model is gradually being replaced by hosted subscription services. Legacy enterprise software vendors typically offer both models, but incentivise their customers to move to the cloud.

A WMS may be a standalone product, or can be a module or category of modules within a larger Enterprise Resource Planning (ERP) system, Shipping or Inventory Management Software, or Supply Chain Management System (SCMS). There may be surcharges when adding agencies or workers. Installation type does not affect the level of functionality that may be achieved by a WMS, so long as sufficient computing power is provisioned and data is successfully synchronised with other systems.

== Comparison with other software packages ==
Inventory Management Software is used in many industries, such as manufacturing, retail and hospitality. Like warehouse management systems, its foundational feature is tracking stock levels of different materials. These two types of software begin to differ at more advanced levels. For example, a service business with a relatively simple ‘warehouse’ or storeroom is more likely to require features that analyse the cost of materials it consumes, or the optimal moment to purchase additional stock, rather than complex WMS features that focus on efficient movement of material within the warehouse itself.

Many Enterprise Resource Planning systems include a warehouse management module or set of modules. The core logic of an ERP system is transactional in nature; its purpose is to connect operational and commercial data to accounting and financial decision-making. As a result, its warehouse modules tend to focus on the metrics that are immediately and obviously relevant from a financial point of view, and tend to lack the sophistication of advanced WMS's.

Integrated Supply Chain Management software packages tend to bring together warehouse management with transportation management and additional functionality. Unlike ERP systems, these systems usually focus on operational needs. However, like ERP systems they tend to lack the depth and configurability of a specialised WMS.

The terms Warehouse Control and Warehouse Execution systems are sometimes used interchangeably with each other and with warehouse management systems. However, a WCS traditionally manages motorised equipment such as conveyor belts, as may be found in facilities handling high-volume, low-variety materials. As automation equipment has grown more sophisticated, it has been employed in more complex facilities, giving rise to WES nomenclature for systems that integrate advanced controls and WMS capabilities. As more features are added to each side, the distinction between a high-end WES and WMS blurs.

Yard Management Software is generally aimed at large facilities and organisations that manage their own transport fleet. It can be a standalone system, or a module of a WMS or SCMS. In terms of functionality, a YMS may track an inventory of vehicles, parking spaces and resources, coordinate the movement of full and empty trailers, or manage appointments in order to better predict workload.

Dock Scheduling may be available as a component of a YMS, SCMS or WMS, but usually with a low level of sophistication. Standalone dock scheduling software more frequently includes features that acquire data about incoming loads in advance, or restrict carriers to specific time slots or durations.

Warehouse optimization software (WOS) is a decision-support layer that works alongside a WMS. WOS is deployed in order to provide specialized optimization and decision-support across warehouse operations to improve storage, picking and packing decisions.

== Market ==
According to a report by Grand View Research, “The global warehouse management system market size is expected to grow from US$2.8 billion in 2021 to $6.1 billion by 2026, at a compound annual growth rate of 16.7%.”

The authors of Warehouse Science note that “there are over 300 WMS vendors in the US alone. The largest companies hold less than 20% of the market.”

== Limitations ==
Warehouse management systems are typically legacy from Y2K investments in enterprise software, and are continually revised in various (possibly defunct) programming languages on top of existing systems over the years. This can make a WMS inflexible and difficult to maintain.

Researchers from the Business School at Erasmus University Rotterdam have described a standard WMS as forcing compromises between the abilities of the system and the way the warehouse wants to operate, which may have serious consequences for warehouse performance. Meanwhile, demands on warehouses are growing in an increasingly competitive global marketplace.

Customizing WMSs can be costly—depending on the software, each customization can turn into a reimplementation. More complex software can also be more difficult for employees to use, leading to hire training costs.

Many researchers and analysts have pointed out that receiving operations, which account for about 17% of warehouse operating costs, are an area where contemporary WMSs tend to fall short. Bottlenecks particularly occur in pre-scheduling and communications with external carriers, customers, and suppliers.
