= List of failed and overbudget custom software projects =

This is a list of notable custom software projects which have significantly failed to achieve some or all of their objectives, either temporarily or permanently, and/or have suffered from significant cost overruns.

Note that failed projects, and projects running over budget, are not necessarily the sole fault of the employees or businesses creating the software. In some cases, problems may be due partly to problems with the purchasing organisation, including poor requirements, over-ambitious requirements, unnecessary requirements, poor contract drafting, poor contract management, poor end-user training, or poor operational management.

== Permanent failures ==
Because software, unlike a major civil engineering construction project, is often easy and cheap to change after it has been constructed, a piece of custom software that fails to deliver on its objectives may sometimes be modified over time in such a way that it later succeeds—and/or business processes or end-user mindsets may change to accommodate the software. However, sometimes, for various reasons, neither approach succeeds (or is even tried), and this may be considered as another level of failure—a permanent failure.

Started	Terminated	System name	Type of system	Country or region	Type of purchaser	Problems	Cost (expected)	Outsourced or in-house?	Outcome
1980s	1993	TAURUS	share settlement	United Kingdom (London)	Stock exchange	Scope creep, cost overrun. The project was never completed.	£75m	?	Cancelled
1982	1994	FAA Advanced Automation System	Air Traffic Control	United States	Federal Aviation Administration	Cost overruns, underestimation of ATC complexity, delays, non-incremental change. existing system.	$3–6b	?	Scrapped
1984	1990	RISP	Integrated computer services	United Kingdom (Wessex)	Wessex Health Authority	Scope creep, cost overrun. The project was never completed.	£63m (£29m)	?	Cancelled
1994	1999	INCIS	Crime information	New Zealand	New Zealand Police	Frequently changing development staff, hardware, software and scope.	approx NZD$110m	Outsourced to IBM NZ	Cancelled, then hardware partially reused
1997	2000	Bolit	Customer service, finance and administration system	Sweden	Patent and Registration Office	Too complicated, bad functioning, cost overrun. The project was after completion never used, the agency still today does not have a working IT system.	SEK 300m ($35m)	Outsourced	Scrapped
1999	2006	CSIO Portal	Common technological platform for brokers and insurers to improve workflow efficiency	Canada	Centre for Study of Insurance Operations	Low user adoption, conflict between insurers, new technology, lack of funding	~$15 million CAD"CSIO portal abandoned due to lack of insurer support and availability of other solutions".	Outsourced to IBM"Reconfiguring CSIO".	Abandoned
2000	2009	Customer Account Data Engine	System for handling tax records and processing tax returns, replacement for the Individual Master File and others	United States	Internal Revenue Service	Low user adoption, performance issues, scope creep, never replaced IMF and other mainframe software, some dating back to the Kennedy Administration	~US$500 million	Outsourced to IBM, Northrop Grumman and others	Abandoned, intended to be replaced by CADE 2
2002	2011	NHS Connecting for Health	Electronic care records	United Kingdom	Central government	Beset by delays and ballooning costs, and the software part of it was never finished. The government was also criticised for not demonstrating value for money. Although the contracts were drafted to ensure that the contractors would be forced to bear a significant portion of the cost of the project going wrong if it did go wrong, in reality this did not always happen. The NPfIT was described by Members of Parliament as one of the "worst and most expensive contracting fiascos" ever.	£12bn (£2.3bn)	Outsourced	Discontinued, but some parts continued
2005	2012	Expeditionary Combat Support System	Military Enterprise Resource Planning	United States	Air force	No significant capabilities ready on time; would have cost $1.1bn more just to get to 1/4 of the original scope.	$1.1bn	Outsourced – including requirements	Cancelled
2007	2012	Polsag	Police case management	Denmark	Police	Did not work properly, technical problems with contractor.	DKK 500m ($70m)	Outsourced	Cancelled
2007	2014	e-Borders	Advanced passenger information programme	United Kingdom	UK Border Agency	A series of delays.	over £412m (£742m)	Outsourced	Cancelled
2007	2010	Försäkringskassan SAP	Dental health service system	Sweden	Social Insurance Agency	Not fit for purpose, multiple delays, cost overrun.	SEK 10bn ($1.18bn)	Outsourced, then insourced	Cancelled
2008	2013	Digital Media Initiative	Digital production, media asset management	United Kingdom	Public service broadcaster	By 2013, the project was judged to be obsolete (as much cheaper commercial off the shelf alternatives by then existed) and was scrapped by BBC management. The Director-General of the BBC said it had been a huge waste of money.	more than £98m (£81.7m)	Outsourced, then insourced, then outsourced again	Cancelled
2009	2013	The Surrey Integrated Reporting Enterprise Network (SIREN)	Crime & criminal intelligence logging system	United Kingdom (Surrey)	Police Force	Not fit for purpose	£14.8m	Outsourced	Scrapped
2011	2014	Pust Siebel	Police case management	Sweden	Police	Poor functioning, inefficient in work environments.	SEK 300m ($35m)	Outsourced	Scrapped
2012	2014	Cover Oregon	Healthcare exchange website	United States	State government	Site was never able to accept online enrollments, so users were instructed to mail in paper enrollments instead.	approx $200m	Outsourced	Cancelled, then client and supplier both sued each other
2017	2023	Distributed Ledger Technology (generic name)	share settlement	Australia	Australian Stock Exchange	System was too complex and only 60% completed	$AU 170m expended	Outsourced	Cancelled

== Temporary issues and budget overruns ==
Started	System name	Type of system	Country or region	Type of purchaser	Problems	Cost (expected)	Outsourced or in-house?
1992	LASCAD	Computer-aided dispatch for emergency ambulances	United Kingdom (London)	Central government	Ambulance delays and other problems were caused by the introduction of the system. More than 30 people may have died as a result, making it the largest computer-related disaster until the downing of Boeing 737 MAX planes in 2019. The Chief of the London Ambulance Service resigned as a result of the problems and the adverse publicity.	£1.5m	Outsourced
2002	Smart Systems for Health / eHealth Ontario	Electronic health record	Ontario, Canada	Provincial government	eHealth Ontario is a group of projects that replaced a previous failed project, Smart Systems for Health, which "spent $650 million but failed to produce anything of lasting value." However, in 2009 the CEO of the eHealth Ontario agency resigned, followed by the government minister responsible for overseeing the agency, after a scandal over excessive payments to consultants. In the next audit in 2016, the Auditor General of Ontario noted that 14 years after Smart Systems for Health was started, not all of the eHealth projects were complete, and it was impossible to even determine if they were overbudget because the government had never originally put a budget on them.	Can$8bn (unknown)	In-house, but with heavy use of consultants
2013	HealthCare.gov	Healthcare exchange website	United States	Federal government	By some estimates, only 1% of people managed to successfully enroll with the site in its first week of operation. On October 20, 2013, President Barack Obama remarked, "There's no sugar coating: the website has been too slow, people have been getting stuck during the application process and I think it's fair to say that nobody's more frustrated by that than I am."	$1.5bn ($93.7m)	Outsourced
2013	Queensland Health Payroll System	Payroll system	Australia	State government	The Queensland Health Payroll System was launched in 2010 in what could be considered one of the most spectacularly over budget projects in Australian history, coming in at over 200 times the original budget. In spite of promises that the new system would be fully automated, the new system required a considerable amount of manual operation.	$AUD 1.2bn ($6m)	Outsourced

== Projects with ongoing problems ==
Until the significant problems with these projects are resolved, or the projects cancelled, it is not yet possible to classify them into one of the above categories.

Started	System name	Type of system	Country or region	Type of purchaser	Problems	Cost (expected)	Outsourced or in-house?
2013	Canada.ca	Government website portal	Canada	Central government	Original plan was to consolidate 1,500 Canadian government websites into a single portal on a single platform. In over three years, only 10,000 webpages of a total 17 million have successfully been migrated.	$9.4 million + $28 million (ongoing)	Outsourced platform and proprietary software
2007	PRIO	Logistic and financial system	Sweden	Armed Forces	Parts of the system was put into use in 2009, with reports of big usability issues following. In 2012 troubles with supply of spare parts was reported, causing multiple Gripen fighter jets to be put out of service. The air force was operating at a 70% capacity, another area was reported to operate at a 3% capacity with half of the staff not able to work at all. It would take up to a year to restore capacity. At this point the cost to scrap the project and develop a new one was estimated to be SEK 11bn ($1.3bn). Not seen as an alternative, the development continued and the original budget of SEK 2.4bn was increased to 4bn. In 2015 the project was still on its way to be fully implemented.	SEK 4bn ($470m) (ongoing)	Technical aspects outsourced
2013	Universal Credit	Welfare payments system consolidation	United Kingdom	Central government	The schedule has slipped, with the final delivery date now expected to be 2021, although the system is gradually being introduced. In 2013, only one of four planned pilot sites went live on the originally scheduled date, and the pilot was restricted to extremely simple cases.	£12.8bn (estimated) (£2.2bn)	Outsourced
2010	Standard Business Reporting (Australian Taxation Office)	Electronic Reporting to Government	Australia	Statutory authority	6 years after program started in 2010, approximately $800m to $1bn has been spent in total. A significant portion of this spend was composed of contracting fees to IBM and Fujitsu. As of early 2016, business take up of electronic reporting was 2-3%. Program has also suffered from significant scope creep and confused objectives. It is likely that choice of XBRL as the reporting format is the main driver behind low take-up (due to its obscurity and high implementation cost relative to other technical standards).	~$1bn to date (ongoing)	Technical aspects outsourced

== See also ==
- Software crisis
- Vaporware
- Agile software development
- Government waste
