= CSIO =

CSIO may refer to:

- Central Scientific Instruments Organisation, an Indian national laboratory dedicated to research, design and development of scientific and industrial instruments
- Centre for Study of Insurance Operations, the Canadian property and casualty insurance industry's nonprofit association of insurers, brokers and software providers
- City State of the Invincible Overlord, a 1976 Judges Guild product that was the first published fantasy role-playing game city setting
- Concours de Saut International Officiel, a ranking system for the equestrian competition show jumping
