= LASCAD =

On 26 October 1992 the London Ambulance Service started to use a new computer-assisted dispatch (CAD) system, known as LASCAD. Poorly designed and implemented, its introduction led to significant delays in the assigning of ambulances - before the system eventually crashed, with anecdotal reports of 11-hour waits. Media reports at the time claimed that up to 30 people may have died as a result of the chaos, despite a lack of evidence. The then-chief executive, John Wilby, resigned shortly afterwards. This failure is often cited in case studies of poor engineering management.

== See also ==
- List of failed and overbudget custom software projects
- Software crisis
