= Hooper Holmes =

Hooper Holmes Inc.
- Formerly: The National Insurance Information Bureau
- Type: Private
- Industry: Healthcare
- Founded: 1899 in New York City
- Founder: William DeMattos Hooper, Bayard P. Holmes
- Defunct: December 31, 2018
- Headquarters: Basking Ridge, New Jersey, U.S.
- Revenue: $144.66 million (As of 2013)
- Website: www.hooperholmes.com

Hooper Holmes Inc. is a national health risk assessment provider in United States. The company mainly serves insurance, wellness and healthcare companies through 275 locations nationwide and in the United Kingdom. Under the trade name Portamedic, the company is the largest provider of examination services in the industry of health insurance.

== Background ==
Hooper Holmes was founded in New York City in 1899 as The National Insurance Information Bureau by William DeMattos Hooper and Bayard P. Holmes, a one-time insurance claim investigation detective. It is now headquartered in Basking Ridge, New Jersey.

Hooper Holmes arranges paramedical examinations to the customers of insurance carriers and evaluate the risks relevant to underwriting insurance policies. The company's Health Information Division (HID) has four segments including Portamedic, Heritage Labs, Health & Wellness and Hooper Holmes Services. Portamedic is engaged in the medical examinations for insurance companies. Heritage Labs (sold to CRLCorp) tested the blood and offers some testing specimen for the process of Health & Wellness line, which provides risk assessment and evaluations. Hooper Holmes Service line is engaged in operating telephone interviews to the candidates of insurance companies. In 2013, the company sold the Portamedic service line to American Para Professional Systems, Inc. The company was also awarded a contract, one base and two option years by the US Department of Veteran's Affairs (VA) in support of a designated trial targeting high-risk patients. Hooper Holmes is now known as Provant Health Solutions, and is located in Olathe, Kansas. It voluntarily discontinued its NYSE listing and switched to OTCQX in 2017. As of September 1, 2018, Hooper Holmes d.b.a. Provant Health Solutions has filed for Chapter 11.

The company has received Early Adopter Award and Business Integration Award in the annual conference of Association for Cooperative Operations Research and Development (ACORD).
