= Roveda =

Roveda is a surname and first name of Hungarian origin.

== Origin ==
The origins of the name Roveda are in ancient Hungarian culture. Rovas was the alphabet used in ancient Hungary, prior to a number of language reforms. Rovas was a composite language formed from the merging of the Runic alphabet from Germany and archaic Aramaic script.

In the Rovas language, a literate person was known as Roveda. In order to establish their position, literate individuals began to adopt the adjective as a family name, thus creating the last name Roveda, meaning: 'literate' in Hungarian. Numerous Hungarian families living in Austria immigrated to bordering Italy. Once in Italy, a number of families using the last name Roveda were forced to convert from Judaism to Catholicism.

With the political separation of Austria and Hungary, Ashkenazi families that had left Hungary to live in Austria began to use common German last names and retained Roveda as a first name to maintain the family bond.

Nowadays, the name is still encountered in scattered Austrian Ashkenazi communities, such as in areas of Argentina Germanic immigration Argentine.

Names deriving from Rovas are Roveda, Rovedaa, Rovenblatt, Rovenstein, Rovensmann, Rovewittz, Rovenbaum, Rovenberg, Rovenfeld.

== People with the surname ==
- Giovanni Roveda (1894–1962), Italian trade union leader, communist politician and anti-fascist activist
- Janet Roveda, Chinese-American electrical and biomedical engineer
