= Plugpoint =

Plugpoint is a term for application programming interface (API). In use, one may say plugpoint to indicate a specific place in an API, or in the API of a framework designed to have software components "plugged" into it. However, plugpoint has no particular meaning in major APIs and frameworks such as .NET, J2EE, and web services. API, listener, interface, and endpoint are accepted terms used in formal documentation.

Plugpoint is a well established term for electrical power-supply devices, such as specific types of wallanisotropic sockets, remote-controlled power devices, and other similar devices. Plugpoint may also refer to the locations where plug-in appliances are permitted at trade shows or other activities where flexible power facilities are required.
