= Good Smartphone Activated Medics =

Good Smartphone Activated Medics (GoodSAM)
- Developers: Ali Ghorbangholi; Mark Wilson
- Release: 2014
- Stable release: Android: Alerter 3.1 (October 26, 2014; 11 years ago) [±]; Android: Responder 3.0.2 (October 9, 2014; 12 years ago) [±]; iOS: Alerter 3.0.1 (November 8, 2014; 11 years ago) [±]; iOS: Responder 3.0.1 (November 8, 2014; 11 years ago) [±]; Windows Phone: Alerter 1.1.0.2 (September 14, 2014; 12 years ago) [±]; Windows Phone: Responder 1.0.0.0 (November 6, 2014; 11 years ago) [±]
- Operating system: Android, iOS, Windows Phone
- Available in: English, French, Spanish and Afrikaans
- Website: goodsamapp.org

GoodSAM is a global emergency and volunteer service platform and associated community co-founded by Mark Wilson OBE, Ali Ghorbangholi OBE and Ali Haddad in 2013. It is used by ambulance, police, fire, government, charity and health services to improve immediate emergency management, largely through video enabling Instant-On-Scene video assessment and from the platform's ability to alert trusted responders to provide immediate help. It is also the platform used to deploy nearly 800,000 NHS Volunteers across the UK to support those isolating or suffering with Covid

The platform is used globally with extensive roll outs in the UK, New Zealand, Australia, USA, Canada and Papua New Guinea.

== Origins and cardiac arrest ==
The GoodSAM platform was originally created to minimise hypoxic brain injury following trauma (a phenomenon known as impact brain apnoea, however, its role in cardiac arrest and other emergencies was immediately apparent. The system was adopted by London Ambulance Service, Ambulance Victoria and St John New Zealand where it has saved many lives. It has subsequently rolled out to most ambulance services across the UK and others around the world.

The GoodSAM Cardiac responder network is highly governed with over 300 organisations on the platform. It works by alerting those trained in CPR to cardiac arrests nearby through integration with the local ambulance / fire service. They provide CPR while the ambulance is en route. The platform also has a large Defibrillator registry thanks to the network of volunteers registering defibrillators.

=== Evidence of Benefit in Cardiac Arrest ===
There are many survivors thanks to a GoodSAM responder starting CPR and using an AED prior to ambulance arrival. A study using early data, when responder density was relatively low demonstrated that having a GoodSAM responder increased odds ratio of survival by three in two different ambulance services. A different UK study showed that for people who were safely discharged from hospital following a cardiac arrest, people were twice as likely to survive when an alert was sent than when it was not.

== Instant-On-Scene Video providing immediate care ==
In 2015 GoodSAM introduced “Instant-On-Scene” a powerful video system that is revolutionising emergency care. It enables emergency services to locate an emergency caller and open their mobile phone camera by simply sending a text or email. This is unlike standard video conferencing systems and is specifically designed for emergency use. Video can be forwarded and controlled in a highly secure, auditable, and governed manner. This sharing within and between services enables better situational awareness and response.

The video system is now integrated into most ambulance and police services in the UK and is the national NHS 111 video system.

=== Evidence of Benefit from Instant-On-Scene Video ===
Multiple studies have shown evidence of benefit. Linderoth et al (2021) demonstrated in 700 emergency calls that GoodSAM video altered the assessment of a patient's condition in > 50% of calls and altered emergency response in 27.5%. The same team also demonstrated significant improvement in rate, depth and position of CPR in GoodSAM video assisted CPR.

== Coronavirus and the UK's volunteer response programme ==
Because of GoodSAM's ability to connect those in need with those who can help, it became the platform to support the NHS Volunteer Responder programme. This programme recruited 800,000 volunteers providing a range of supporting roles to their local community who may have had to shield or isolate because of covid. Roles include Check in and Chat, delivery of food, pharmacies, pulse oximeters, transport of patients and equipment and volunteer vaccination stewards. This has spawned the concept of “micro-volunteering” and may well be one of the positive legacies of the pandemic.

GoodSam has been used in the UK to manage NHS volunteers in response to the coronavirus pandemic.

== Police and fire ==
GoodSAM's platform has integrated with over half of UK Police services. The instant Location function has saved many lives, from people trapped in lorries to people abducted. The video functionality is changing domestic abuse management and enabling officers to assess situations remotely. There are many other features such as hot spot policing and Police ID.
