= ACORD =

Non-profit organization in the insurance industry

- Industry: Insurance, Insurance Technology
- Founded: 1970
- Headquarters: Little Falls, New Jersey; London, UK
- Key people: John Kellington (CEO)
- Website: acord.org

The Association for Cooperative Operations Research and Development (ACORD) is a non-profit organization in the insurance industry. ACORD publishes and maintains an archive of standardized forms. ACORD has also developed a comprehensive library of electronic data standards with more than 1200 standardized transaction types to support insurance data exchange between trading partners. However, ACORD is not an insurance company and does not process claims or provide insurance coverage.

== History ==
Established in 1970 as a non-profit organization, ACORD was formed by insurance carriers and agents focused on building efficiencies in the United States property and casualty insurance market. Originally named Agent Company Operations Research and Development (ACORD), the organization initially aimed to standardize carriers' many proprietary forms for new business and claims submission. In the late 1970s, ACORD began developing electronic standards to complement its form standards. ACORD subsequently expanded its forms and electronic data standards beyond property and casualty insurance to encompass life and annuity, surety, and reinsurance markets. In 2021, a subsidiary of the company, ACORD Solutions Group, received the Insurance Innovator Award from PropertyCasualty360 for its digital solution ADEPT (ACORD Data Exchange Platform & Translator); the award is given to new technologies that are considered to be facilitating faster and more accurate data exchange in the insurance industry.

== Current practices ==
Today, many of the forms and electronic data standards utilized by the insurance and related industries, both in the United States and several countries across the globe, were developed by ACORD. Over 850 variants of these forms are available. A structural analysis of 49 ACORD forms by the form-automation service Instafill assigned the category a median Form Complexity Score of 66 out of 100 (classified as "complex"), a deterministic 0–100 index of the effort required to complete a form based on factors such as its number of fillable fields, input types, page count, and conditional logic. The Lloyd's of London insurance market uses ACORD standards for messaging between counterparties. Lloyd's Core Data Record, an attempt to standardized data exchange, is based on ACORD standards.

In 2018, ACORD partnered with DataPro on the production of new software that would streamline the implementation of insurance data standards. The project aimed to improve data integration between legacy data systems and a new wave of automated data processing systems.

ACORD also provided expertise on digital data standards in collaboration with IBM, ISN, and Marsh to streamline the proof of insurance process with the help of blockchain technology. The partnership attempts to eliminate the time- and labor-intensive paper insurance certificates that dominate the global insurance market. A pilot project for the new platform, called Insurwave, launched in the spring of 2018, uses the blockchain to create a distributed ledger of insurance data and to automate the recording of shipping information for maritime transactions.

ACORD has also worked with the Centre for Study of Insurance Operations on numerous initiatives, including the development of North American XML data standards and creating a telematics data standard.

In October 2024, ACORD released a standardized life insurance application intended to streamline underwriting and regulatory approval. Described as the first of its kind, the form was approved by the Interstate Insurance Compact for pre-filing in 47 jurisdictions, allowing applicants to apply to participating life insurers using a single industry-standard form.

In 2025, ACORD continued to expand its Next-Generation Digital Standards (NGDS), launching an NGDS Object Model to support the exchange of standardized data between enterprise systems across the insurance industry. In July 2025, ACORD and the broker Howden announced that ACORD standards for digital accounting and invoicing had gone live in the United Kingdom retail insurance market, marking the first use of the standards in the UK outside the specialty and reinsurance markets.

ACORD is headquartered in Little Falls, New Jersey, and maintains an office in London, UK.
