= Janet Roveda =

Chinese-American electrical and biomedical engineer

Janet Meiling Wang-Roveda is a Chinese and American electrical and biomedical engineer known for her research on microgrids. She is the Litton Industries John M. Leonis Distinguished Professor of Electrical and Computer Engineering at the University of Arizona, where she directs the Center to Stream Healthcare In Place and also holds affiliations in the Department of Biomedical Engineering, BIO5 Institute, and College of Nursing. Beyond microgrids, she lists her research interests as "smart grids and smart homes, VLSI systems for biomedical applications, multicore design, data centric systems, reliable systems and circuits, DNA computing, and synthetic biology".

Roveda has a 1991 bachelor's degree in computer science from the Nanjing University of Science and Technology. She continued her studies in electrical engineering and computer science at the University of California, Berkeley, where she received a master's degree in 1997 and completed her Ph.D. in 2000. Her doctoral advisor was Ernest S. Kuh. She was a 2005 recipient of the Presidential Early Career Award for Scientists and Engineers, and in 2024 was elected as a Fellow of the American Institute for Medical and Biological Engineering. In 2025, the University of Arizona gave her the Litton Industries John M. Leonis Distinguished Professorship.
