= Centre for Study of Insurance Operations =

CSIO, the Centre for Study of Insurance Operations, is the Canadian property and casualty insurance industry's nonprofit association of insurers, brokers and software providers. Much of its work is in the development of data standards, especially XML and EDI, for the transmission of insurance information throughout the Canadian P&C insurance industry.

CSIO also promotes the adoption of various technologies within the industry, such as telematics and electronic signature, that promise to enhance efficiencies in the broker distribution channel. For example, as part of its XML standards, CSIO released a telematics data standard in January 2014 to facilitate the process of transferring driving data from an insurance customer's vehicle to an insurance company. CSIO worked together with the US insurance standards organization ACORD on the telematics initiative.

Regarding the electronic signature initiative, in the summer of 2014, CSIO developed and published the eSignatures Vendor Dashboard, a resource for insurance brokers to help them research and choose an e-signature software solution.

CSIO has campaigned for the adoption of Transport Layer Security (TLS) among brokers and insurers in the Canadian property and casualty industry. In 2014, CSIO released its TLS Chart, showing that over 1,200 member brokerages across Canada use TLS.

CSIO has promoted the concept of the paperless office to Canadian brokerages. It developed the eDocs data standard in order to help brokers and insurance companies transition away from the printing and mailing of paper documents. Various companies within the Canadian insurance industry support and have adopted the CSIO eDocs standard to make their workflows more paperless.

CSIO works to strengthen market share for the independent insurance agent network in Canada. Its members comprise all the provincial broker associations in Canada, including the Insurance Brokers Association of Ontario (IBAO).

== History ==
CSIO got its start in 1981 as a not-for profit organization focused on building efficiencies in the Canadian property and casualty insurance market. Its initial focus was in standardizing the many proprietary forms and computer systems being used among brokers and insurance companies for their communications.

In 1997, the organization built CSIOnet to transmit data between insurance industry trading partners such as brokers and insurers. This network still serves as the Canadian P&C insurance industry's primary network for the distribution of EDI insurance policy data.

In 1999, CSIO initiated a project to create an online portal based on SEMCI technology, enabling single sign-on for brokers and real-time transactions between brokers and insurers. The portal project was ultimately abandoned in 2006, after the industry spent approximately $15 million on the development effort.

In 2012, after brokers in the industry indicated a strong preference for standardized over proprietary technology solutions, CSIO released its XML eDocs data standard to deliver workflow efficiencies for brokers.

In June 2017, CSIO announced plans to develop an industry-wide solution to deliver electronic proof of auto insurance to consumers. The solution, called My Proof of Insurance, formally launched in February 2018, available to all members at no additional cost.
