= Liquid computing =

Liquid computing refers to a style of workflow interaction of applications and computing services across multiple devices, such as computers, smartphones, and tablets. The term was coined in July 2014 by InfoWorld, but the underlying concepts have long existed in computer science, such as in the notions of pervasive computing and ubiquitous computing. The key differentiator for liquid computing over other related notions is that of being focused on the movement among devices of a workflow involving people.

In a liquid computing approach, a person might work on a task on one device, then go to another device that detects the task in progress at the first device and offer to take over that task. For example, you might begin composing an email on a smartphone and when you come near your computer, its mail software detects the in-progress email and lets you continue to work on it on the computer. The data involved, including its current state, flows from one device to another (more accurately, from an application on a device to an application on another device), thus the term "liquid computing." An example of this approach is Apple's Handoff (Continuity) service in iOS 8 and OS X Yosemite (the feature is available only for compatible devices, such as iOS devices with a Lightning port and 2012-or-later Mac models that support Bluetooth Low Energy and Wi-Fi Direct).

Google has announced a similar approach for applications in its Android Lollipop operating system and its ChromeOS operating system to interact with each other in a manner similar to Handoff.

A limitation of current liquid computing implementations is that they are confined to specific vendors' platforms, such as within Apple's iOS and OS X pair or within Google's Android and ChromeOS pair. That means workflows can't flow across different vendors' devices, such as from an Apple iPad to a Microsoft Windows PC. That is not a technical limitation of the liquid computing concept but a vendor decision to encourage adoption of its product ecosystem. Both Apple and Google, for example, make liquid computing capabilities available to developers through a set of APIs that theoretically could be made available to competing platforms, but currently are not. To address this problem, the liquid computing concept can be applied to Web applications running across different Web-enabled devices.

== Liquidity as a Quality Attribute ==
More in general, liquid software features flexible redeployment in response to changes to the software and to its execution environment. As the software is updated, the new version is seamlessly redeployed, replacing the previous one without any user disruption. As the devices on which it runs change (as in the above user workflow scenario), the software smoothly follows the user attention focus from one device to the next. Overall, within the List of system quality attributes, liquidity can be defined as the combination of deployability with flexibility.

== Related technologies ==
Several operating systems — Apple's iOS and OS X and Microsoft's Windows 8 — can sync settings across multiple devices, as can the Google Chrome browser and Apple Safari browser. The cross-device interaction concept is similar to liquid computing, but lacks the workflow characteristic of liquid computing.

Another related concept involves transferring a service from one device to another, such as sending a phone call or text message from a phone to a computer. Apple does not include this capability (available in OS X Yosemite and iOS 8) in its definition of Handoff, but instead assigns this feature to its set of services called Continuity, which includes Handoff. BlackBerry has a similar capability called Blend available for its smartphones to send calls or texts to OS X Macs and Windows PCs. These transfer services are similar to phone or email forwarding in that the communications is forwarded to another available device (usually via a Wi-Fi connection), and there's no interaction with the data itself as there is in liquid computing. Also, liquid computing allows multiple handoffs during the workflow, whereas communications transfers do not.

Likewise, the Internet of things notion is similar to liquid computing in that it involves direct communication among devices for a computing-oriented purpose, such as analyzing a person's level of physical activity, tracking users in a shopping mall to determine coupon offers, or correlating traffic conditions and flow to recommend alternative routes. Data flows among devices or to a central application hosted on a back-end server, but at most only part of the workflow involves a person, not the entire chain of activity.

The various kinds of computer-to-computer interactions and human-computer interactions that include liquid computing are not exclusive to each other; the various type of interactions can be combined.
