= SEMCI =

Single Entry Multiple Company Interface (SEMCI) is a computer system based on service-oriented architecture (SOA) that is used to submit the same information to multiple companies. SEMCI is use by insurance agents to insurance quotes from several insurance companies at once.

SEMCI is an interface which connects the software of the agent to the software of multiple companies so that an inquiry can go to all the companies at once. Previously, the agent would need to send the inquiry to each company individually.
