= Proof of insurance =

Proof of insurance (POI) is documentation that proves that a person has valid insurance with an insurance company.

Where vehicle insurance is compulsory, a driver usually must carry proof of insurance in their automobile or on their person while driving. If a driver is questioned by a law enforcement official, they must provide proof of insurance and often face a penalty if they do not.

The most common form of a POI in the United States was a paper card provided by the insurance company listing policy information and effective dates, though now electronic versions for smartphones are also used. Provisionally proof of insurance may sometimes be issued, such as a "cover note" in the UK, for use while awaiting the full documents for a valid insurance policy.

== See also ==
- No fault insurance
