= NATO Software Engineering Conferences =

Conferences aimed at defining software development best practices

The NATO Software Engineering Conferences were held in 1968 (Garmisch, Germany), and 1969 (Rome, Italy). The conferences were attended by international experts on computer software, who agreed on defining best practices for software grounded in the application of engineering. The result of the conferences were two reports, one for the 1968 conference and the other for the 1969 conference, that defined how software should be developed. The conferences played a major role in gaining general acceptance for the term software engineering.

The historian Nathan Ensmenger describes the conferences as a reaction of raising tensions between operational management and programmers.

== See also ==
- Software crisis
