= Software crisis =

Term in early computing history

Software crisis is a term used in the early days of computing science for the difficulty of writing useful and efficient computer programs in the required time. The software crisis was due to the rapid increases in computer power and the complexity of the problems that could be tackled. With the increase in the complexity of the software, many software problems arose because existing methods were inadequate.

== History ==
The term "software crisis" was coined by some attendees at the first NATO Software Engineering Conference in 1968 at Garmisch, Germany. Edsger Dijkstra's 1972 Turing Award Lecture makes reference to this same problem:

The major cause of the software crisis is that the machines have become several orders of magnitude more powerful! To put it quite bluntly: as long as there were no machines, programming was no problem at all; when we had a few weak computers, programming became a mild problem, and now we have gigantic computers, programming has become an equally gigantic problem.

— Edsger Dijkstra, The Humble Programmer (EWD340), Communications of the ACM

== Causes ==
The causes of the software crisis were linked to the overall complexity of hardware and the software development process. The crisis manifested itself in several ways:

- Projects running over-budget and/or over-time
- Inefficient, low quality software, which often did not meet requirements
- Unmanageable projects and difficult-to-maintain code
- Vaporware

The main cause is that improvements in computing power had outpaced the ability of programmers to effectively use those capabilities. Various processes and methodologies have been developed over the last few decades to improve software quality management such as procedural programming and object-oriented programming. However, software projects that are large, complicated, poorly specified, or involve unfamiliar aspects, are still vulnerable to large, unanticipated problems.

== See also ==
- AI winter
- Development hell
- List of failed and overbudget custom software projects
- Fred Brooks
- System accident
- Technological singularity
