= ULMA Architectural Solutions =

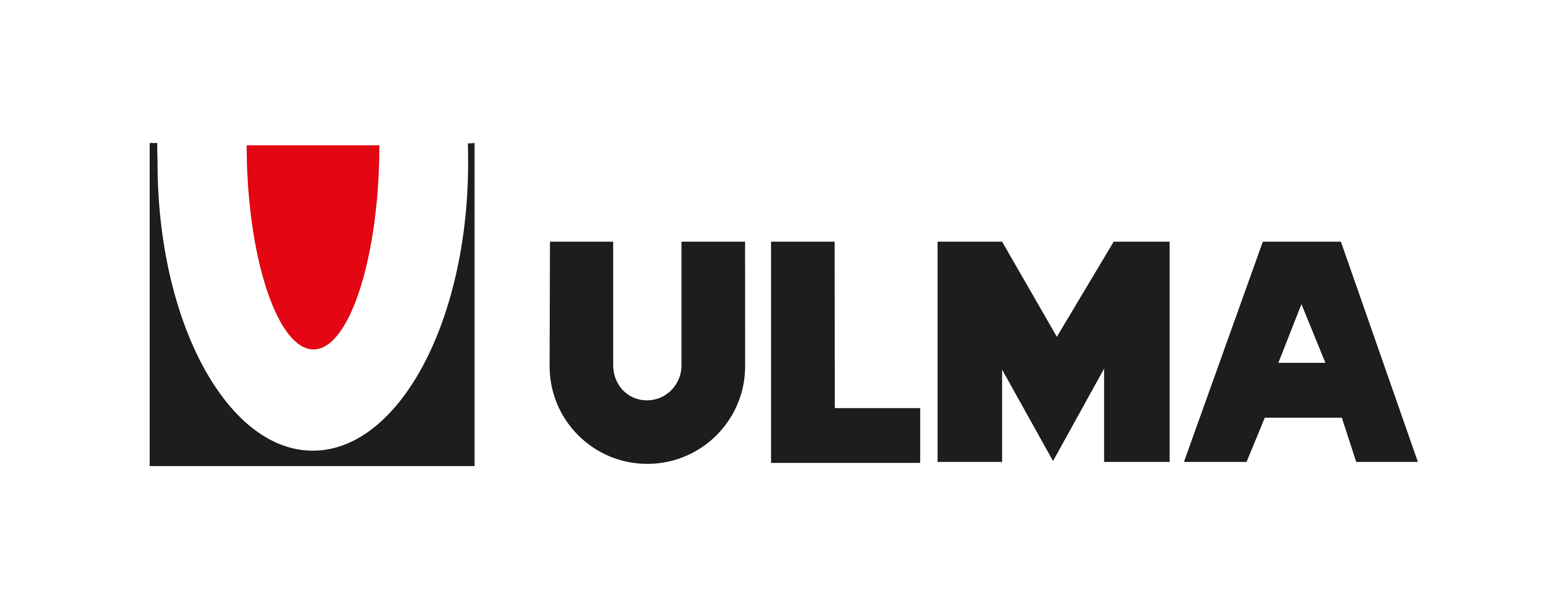

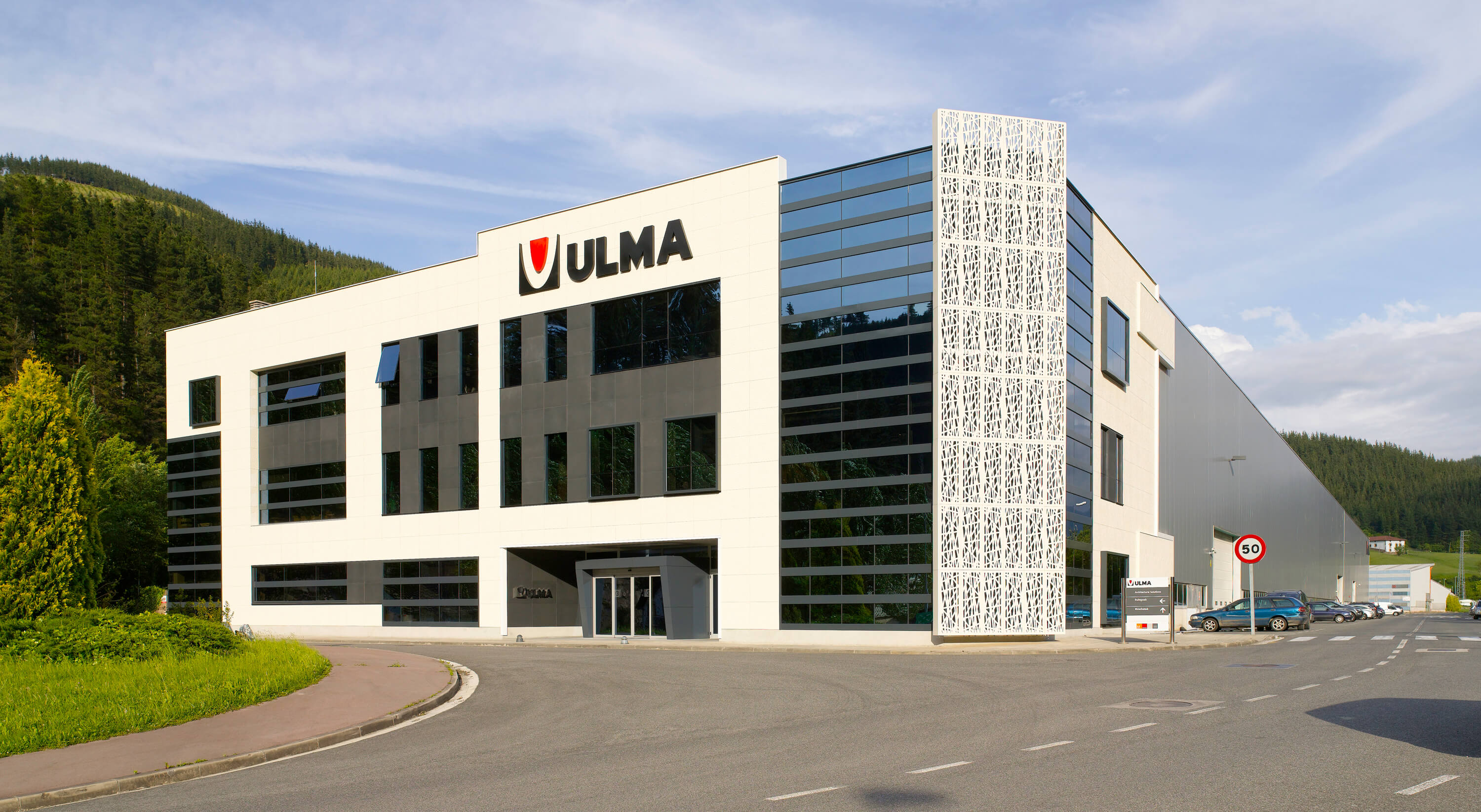
- ULMA Architectural Solutions Headquarter
- Type: Cooperative
- Industry: Construction
- Founded: 1990
- Headquarters: Oñati, Spain
- Area served: Worldwide
- Key people: Unai Arregi (President)
- Products: Channels and Drainage, Architectural Pre-fabricates, Enclosure Walls, Ventilated Facades and Urban Furniture.
- Number of employees: 250 (2023)
- Subsidiaries: Portugal, France, Brazil, United Kingdom, Italy, Germany and United States
- Website: www.ulmaarchitectural.com

ULMA Architectural Solutions is a cooperative in the construction sector that creates prefabricated products for drainage and architecture. In the field of architecture it offers: ventilated facades, industrialized enclosures, customized prefabricated products and urban furniture. It is one of the 9 cooperative companies that make up ULMA, one of the largest business groups in northern Spain.

== History ==
ULMA Architectural Solutions is one of the 9 companies which make up ULMA cooperative group, which dates back to 1957 when six young mechanics set up a small workshop in Oñate (Guipúzcoa) to offer ancillary services to the chocolate industry in the region. In 1961, they formed the Industrial Cooperative Talleres ULMA S.C.I., the name of which is an acronym of their surnames, following the example of the founders of Fagor Electrodomésticos.

Although their first business was based on chocolate packaging machines (which led to the company now known as ULMA Packaging), in 1963 they patented the first JJEIP prefabricated scaffolding in Spain, which was their introduction to the construction business. As their business grew with products such as construction flanges and forklift trucks, the different businesses adopted a new, unique corporate image which took shape in the 1990s.

In 1990 ULMA Group decided to launch a new business called ULMA Polymer Concrete, dedicated to the manufacture of prefabricated polymer concrete drainage channels and window sills, as part of ULMA Construction. In 1991, the new business set up its premises and began to manufacture the first prefabricated pieces of polymer concrete, a material hitherto unknown in Spain. Indeed, it was so unknown that it was not sure how to translate "polymer concrete" into Spanish, and ended up calling it "mineral colado".

In 1996, the company left ULMA Construction and set up as a business under the name ULMA Polymer Concrete. In 1997 it consolidated its own sales network and, in 2001, started to manufacture and market ventilated facades, which supplemented its existing products such as architectural prefabricates. Its headquarters, covering 12,000 sqm. in the Zubillaga district in Oñati, opened in 2001.

== Economic data ==
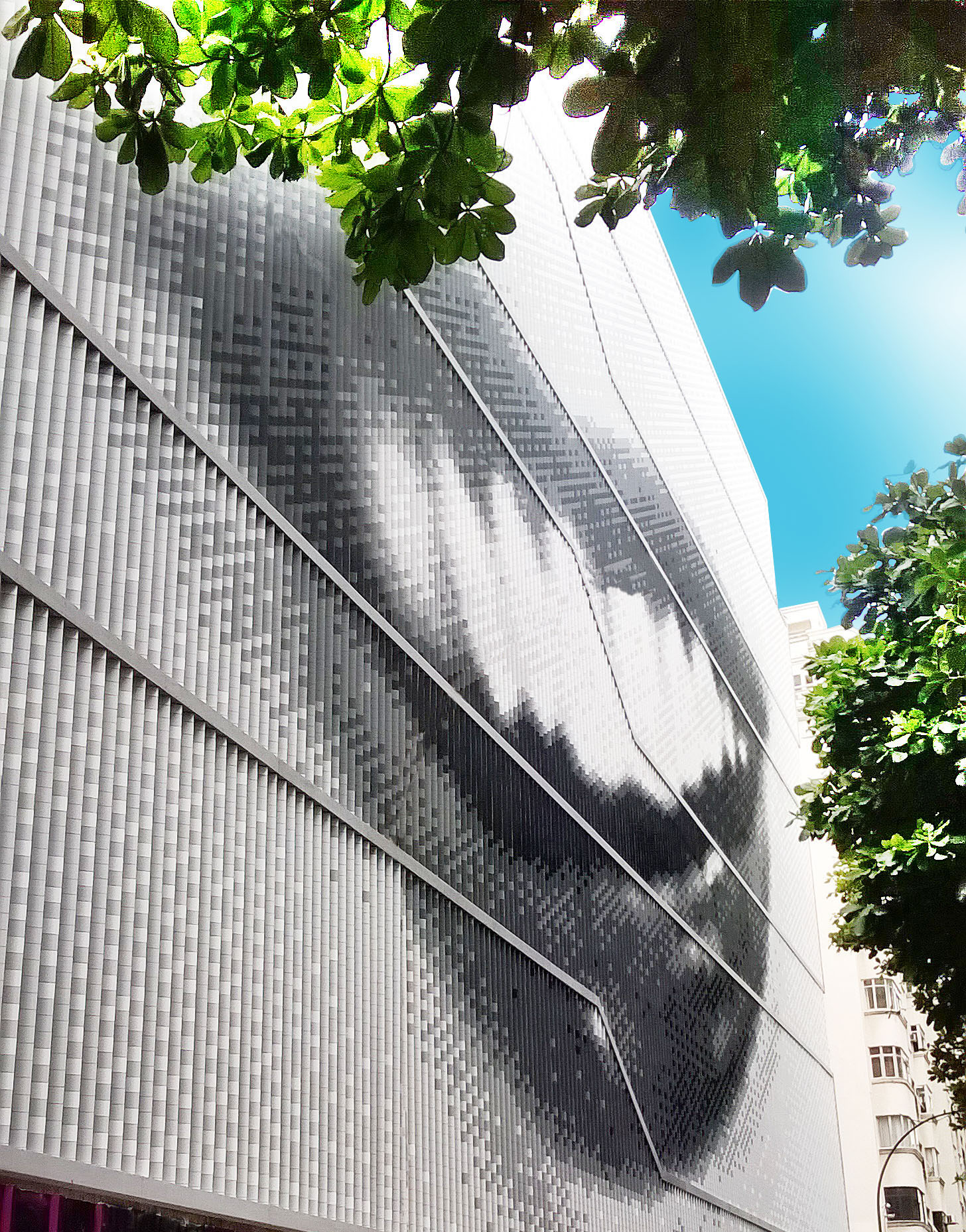
Rio de Janeiro office

In 2023 ULMA Architectural Solutions has 250 employees. It forms part of ULMA Group, is present in 80 countries with a workforce of 5,500 people and turns over 1000 million euros. The other businesses in the group are ULMA Construction, ULMA Forklift Trucks, ULMA Conveyor Components, ULMA Embebbed Solutions, ULMA Handling Systems, ULMA Packaging and ULMA Forged Solutions.

== Products ==
ULMA Architectural Solutions manufactures four types of products all in polymer concrete:

- Canalization and drainage: for fluid canalization and surface collection of rainwater, as well as for the conduction of facilities and services. Linear drainage, electrical conduits and beaconing.
- Architectural prefabricated products: flashings, copings, jambs, baseboards.
- Facade enclosures: self-supporting multilayer enclosure system with thermal and acoustic insulation.
- Ventilated facades: a system for cladding building walls that leaves a ventilated chamber between the cladding and the insulation.
- Urban furniture: urban benches, lighting fixtures and planters.

All these products are made of polymer concrete, a material composed of a combination of silica and quartz aggregates, bound by stable polyester resins. It is up to four times more resistant to compression than traditional concrete, allowing the production of lightweight elements - pieces with a thinner profile that allow the use of auxiliary means of transport to the construction site - and of reduced dimensions.

== International market ==
Since 2009, ULMA Architectural Solutions has opened subsidiaries in Portugal, France, Brazil, Germany, the United Kingdom, Italy and the United States. It has a presence through distributors in more than 20 countries around the world.

== Projects ==
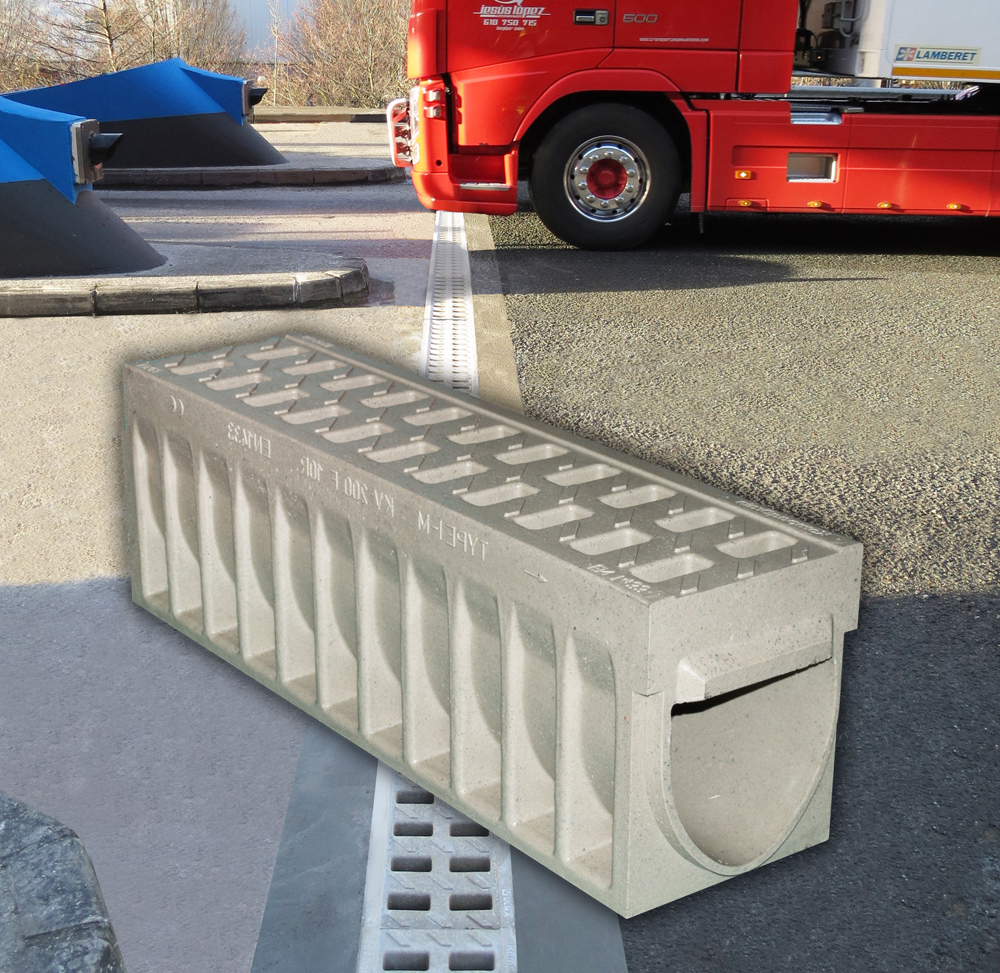
Kompaq Drain building block, from ULMA

- Ventilated facades in residential buildings such as the BBK care home in Bilbao or apartment blocks in Cornellá (Barcelona), as well as others dedicated to leisure and culture, such as the Image and Sound Museum of Rio de Janeiro and Portoseguro Theatre in São Paulo, Brazil.
- Energetic refurbishment of residential buildings in Cornellá (Barcelona) with ventilated facades.
- Drainage channels in Arese shopping centre in Milan (1100 linear metres of channels throughout the surface of the underground car park); in Campofrío's 50,000 sqm. plant for the production of frozen pizzas in Ólvega (Soria); in the entrances to the Camp Nou; in the Guggenheim Museum in Bilbao and in Madrid Barajas, Malaga and São Paulo Guarulhos airports, amongst others.
- Refurbishment of terraces with prefabricated stone finish in residential buildings in Barcelona.

Since 2016 ULMA Architectural Solutions has also offered indoor coatings with different textures, colours, finishes and formats.
