= ULMA Group =

Spanish industrial cooperative group

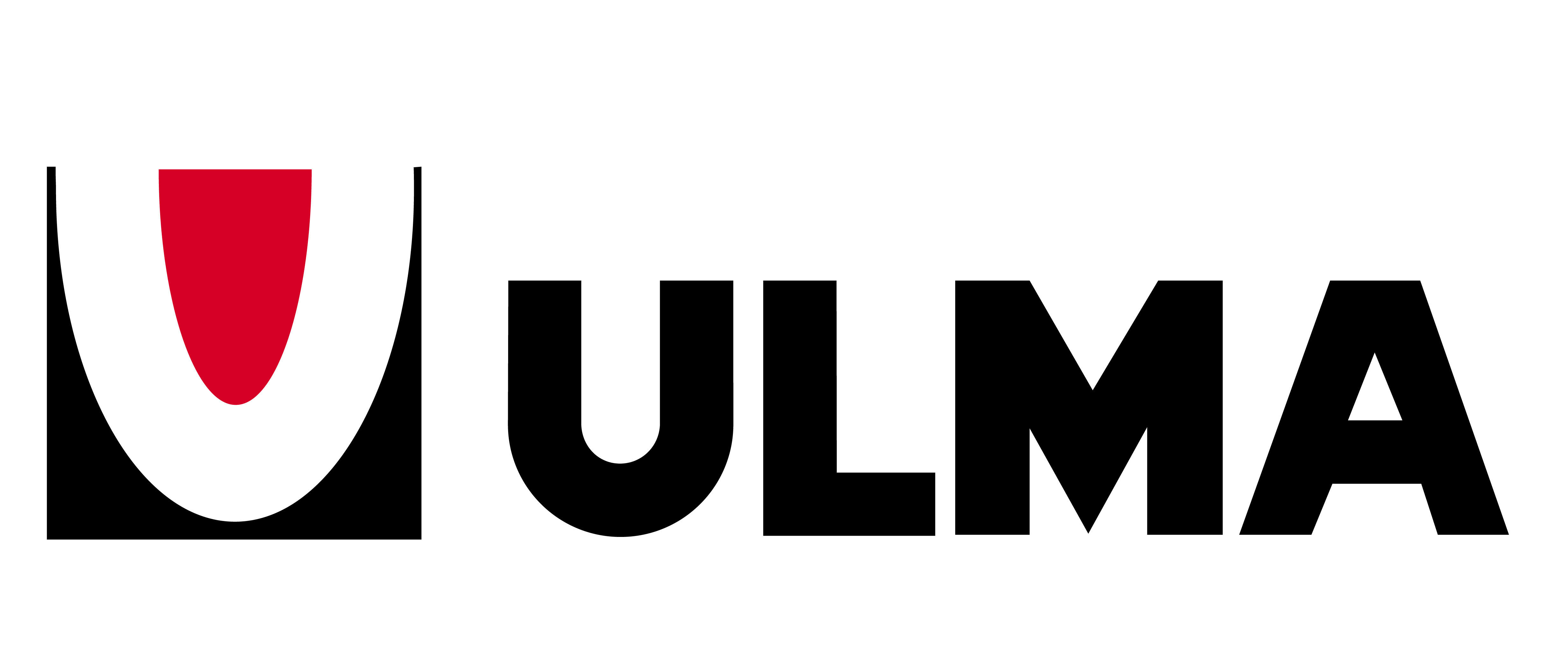

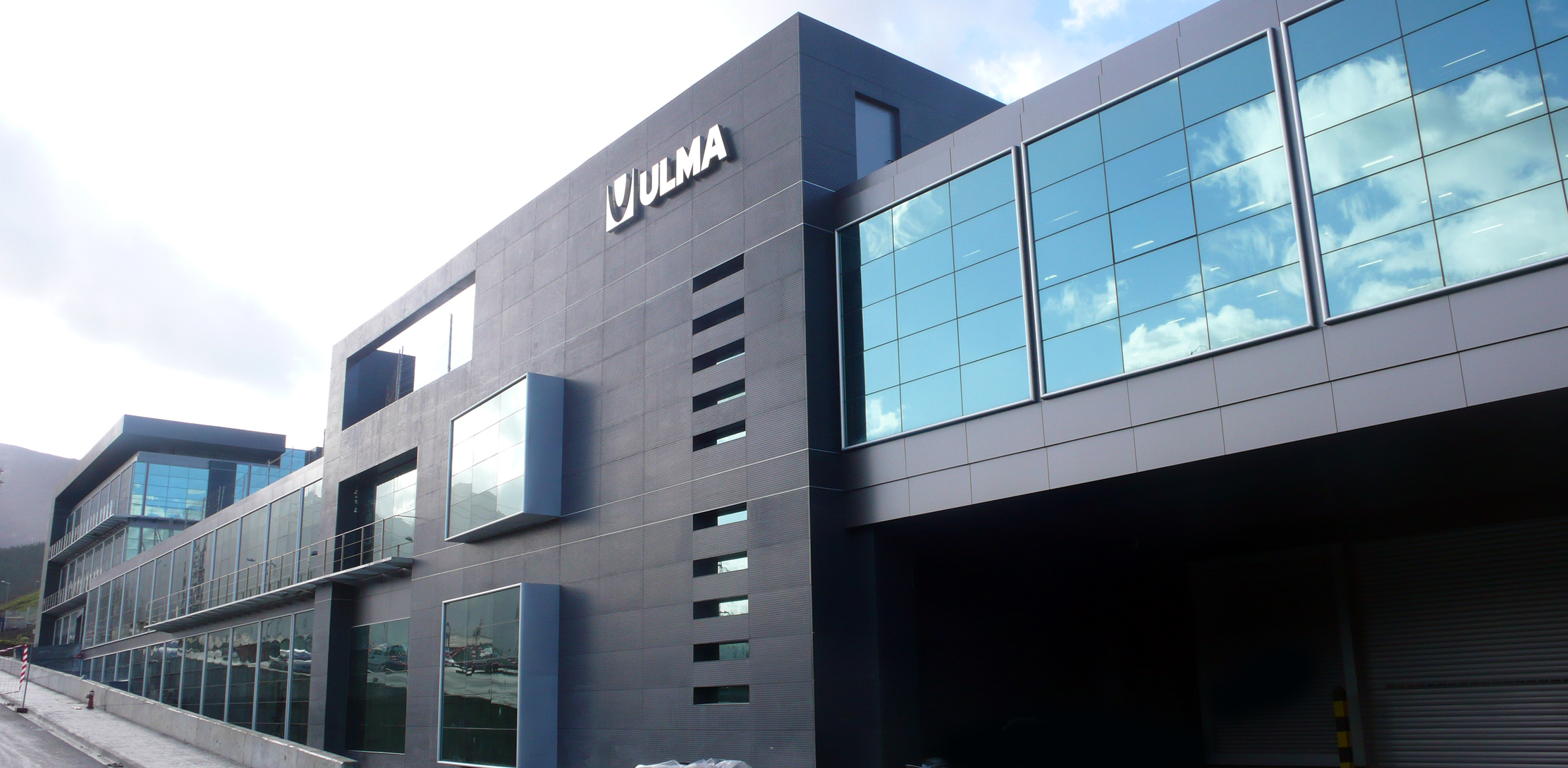
- ULMA Group Headquarter
- Company type: Cooperative
- Industry: Multisectoral
- Founded: 1961
- Founders: Pedro Ugarte, Isidro Mendiola, Ignacio Maiztegui, Julián Ayastuy, Esteban Lizarralde and Julián Lizarralde
- Headquarters: Oñati, Spain
- Area served: Worldwide
- Key people: Ibon Calvo (President)
- Products: Greenhouses, rollers-pulleys-garlands and idlers, automated warehouses, prefabricated polymer concrete for construction, formwork and scaffolding for construction, packaging equipment and systems, flanges-fittings, forklift trucks, engineering services
- Number of employees: 5,747 (2025)
- Website: www.ulma.com

The ULMA Group is a business group, made up of nine cooperatives. It group currently has a presence in 81 countries and is one of the largest business groups in northern Spain.

== History ==
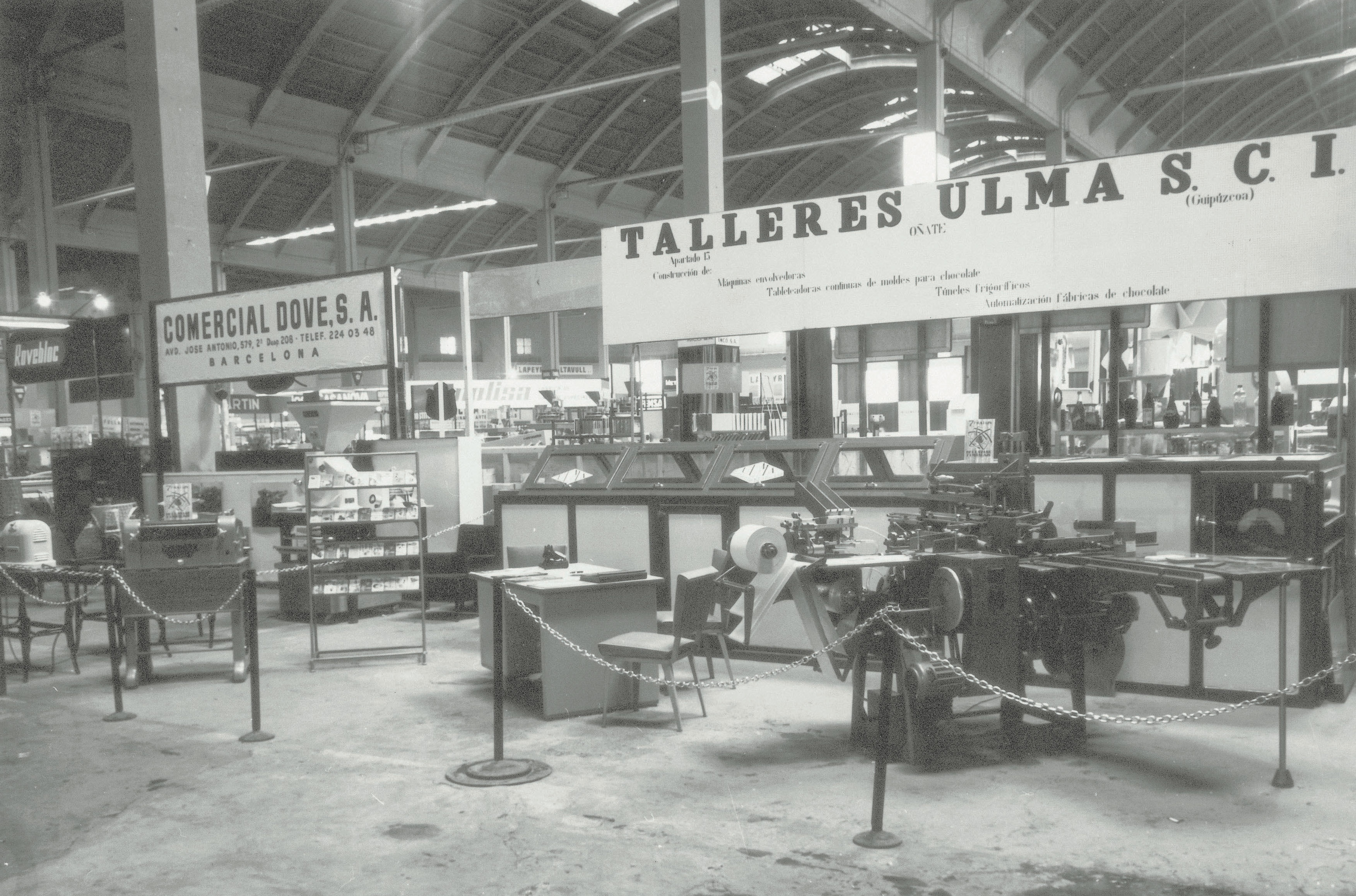
XXXI International Fair of Barcelona,1963

The origins of ULMA dates back to 1957. That year, six mechanics set up their first workshop to offer auxiliary services to the region's chocolate industry. When they established their first cooperative, on September 8, 1961, they used the first letter of each of their last names to give the company its name and thus Cooperativa Industrial Talleres ULMA S.C.I. Initially, the cooperative was dedicated to manufacturing wrapping machines for chocolates, today ULMA Packaging, and it entered the construction sector, another of its current pillars. It was in 1963, when those responsible for the cooperative patented the first prefabricated scaffolding made in Spain under the JJEIP brand.

At the same time and in the same region, four workers from the Forjas de Zubillaga company decided to acquire a locksmith and accessories workshop. Their names were Pedro and Enrique Guridi, Sebastian Ayastui, Ramón Irizar, Sabino Tellería and Juan Urcelay and they made balconies, metal doors and other forged and stamped products. In 1962, they too decided to become a cooperative and, as with ULMA, they chose a name based on the letters of their last names. During the first years, the company was called Gaitu S.C.I. In 1967, however, it was renamed as Enara. Its growth and consolidation gave rise to the manufacture of cable ties through the acquisition of a Drop Hammer that would transform the company and be the basis for its subsequent development.

The first rapprochement between ULMA and Enara took place in 1983. In 1987, the Oñalan group, the name with which the ULMA Group began its journey, grew with the integration of Oinakar, another cooperative. In 1989, the Group changed its name to ULMA Group.

At the end of 1989, the Group had 678 workers and a sales volume of 8,323 million pesetas (50 million euros).

=== Consolidation ===
In the 1990s all of the Group's businesses decided to adopt a new and unique corporate image. For this, in 1990 and 1991, the cooperative ULMA S. Coop. changed its name to ULMA C y E, S. Coop. The rest of the businesses incorporated the ULMA brand and trade name. In 1996, ULMA Polymer Concrete (today ULMA Architectural Solutions) was established. In 1992, Oinakar became ULMA Manutención S.Coop. and Enara, at ULMA Forja S. Coop (today ULMA Forged Solutions). In 1994, the ULMA MANUTENCIÓN cooperative split the businesses of Forklift Trucks (today ULMA Servicios de Manutención) and Systems (today ULMA Handling Systems). In 2008, ULMA Conveyor Components joined the Group, coming from the Rochman cooperative. In 2019, ULMA Embedded Solutions was consolidated as the ninth business of the ULMA Group.

In 1993, as a result of the decision to have its own cooperative group, ULMA decided not to take part in the organisational restructuring proposed by the Mondragon Cooperative Corporation (MCC). In 2002, however, its members approved the group joining the Industrial Division of Mondragon. In December 2022, in a plenary assembly of the ULMA Group cooperative, they decided to leave the Mondragon Corporation.

== Organization ==
As of 2023, about 5,747 people work in the ULMA Group, which currently has a business volume of more than 1.15 billion euros, of which close to 70% were international sales. Although all its cooperatives/Businesses share general policies and joint management strategies, each of them manufactures and markets its own products.

- ULMA Agrícola: greenhouses.
- ULMA Conveyor Components: Design and manufacture of rollers for bulk transport.
- ULMA Construction: engineering for formwork, climbing systems, shoring and scaffolding, both for sale and for rent for construction, civil works, industry and rehabilitation.
- ULMA Embedded Solutions: Specialized consulting and engineering services in the life cycle of electronic products, from the conceptual design phase and its validation to the automation of the production test system.
- ULMA Forged Solutions: Manufacturer of flanges and forged components.
- ULMA Architectural Solutions: Designs, manufactures and markets prefabricated systems for DRAINAGE and ARCHITECTURE. In this last sector it offers: Ventilated Facades, Industrialized Enclosures, Custom Prefabricated and Urban Furniture.
- ULMA Handling Systems: It develops its activity as a comprehensive intralogistics engineering in collaboration with the world leader in the sector DAIFUKU.
- ULMA Packaging: Specialist in the design and manufacture of packaging and lines.
- ULMA Lifting Solutions: for the handling of goods through the use of maintenance machinery.

== Projects ==
These are some of the projects of the ULMA Group.

- Greenhouses in the desert, Middle East, ULMA Agrícola: Nearly two hectares of horticultural crops under extreme climatic conditions, with a lack of water and high temperatures.
- Hudson Yards Skyscraper, New York, ULMA Construction: Execution of the skyscraper core, made up of 4 elevator shafts in Tower C of the most important urban project that has been carried out in Manhattan in the 1990s and 2000s, using the ATR Self-Climbing System with MK and Megaform structures as modular formwork.
- Drainage channels in the largest stadium in Poland, ULMA Architectural Solutions: More than 300 linear meters of drainage channels in the access areas to the facilities and in the parking lot, in the Krakow Arena, the largest stadium in Poland.
- Talara refinery modernization project, Peru, ULMA Piping: Custom design and supply of flanges for the modernization of the plant that will go from 65,000 barrels per day to 95,000.
- Expansion of the Port of Gangavaram (India), ULMA Conveyor Components: Supply of rollers, supports and drums for the new iron ore and coal port terminal.
- ULMA Maintenance Services online SAT: A system that makes it possible to standardize and optimize action processes in the after-sales area and offers real-time information.
- Flow pack container with perforation for the sterilization of medical products, ULMA Packaging: The container minimizes the use of medical paper that is perforated by laser for subsequent sterilization.
- Logistics Automation System for the textile sector for Brandili (Brazil) and Indutop (Uruguay), ULMA Handling: Innovative automatic storage and order preparation system (FSS), a pioneer in the world.
- ULMA Handling Systems: Eroski's logistics platform in Elorrio that automates 50% of the traffic and 70% of the weight managed in its food platform for the northern area. First logistics platform in Europe that also manages to automate bottle logistics.
- ULMA Embedded Solutions: FPGA design for ESA's main Galileo EGNOS RIMS ground station.
