= Urquía =

- Language: Basque

Origin
- Origin: Isasondo and Arautz (now Oñate)
- Meaning: birch

Urquía is a surname which originated in the municipalities of Itsasondo and Zarautz which is now Oñati. It is located in the province of Guipúzcoa, within the Spanish Basque country. The villages of Urki Errota, and Urkigoena Azpi are in these districts.

== Surname meaning ==
Urquía signifies birch or "Place of the birches", which breaks down as follows: Urki refers to the birch tree, the suffix a denotes a locality. Birches were historically planted to mark territorial boundaries in the rural Basque country. There are several variations, such as Urkia, Urquía, Urquilla, Urquiza, Urquijo, Urquiaga, Urkullo, and Urquiola.

== History ==
Urquía, as a surname, is recorded in writing in 1625 in Spain but was in use many years before.

On October 30, 1340, the military arm of the Urquía family, under orders from His Majesty King Alfonso XI of Castile, took part in the "Battle of Río Salado" winning a victory against the Moors near the Tafira coast. King Alfonso XI of Castile knighted Los Urquía following the Battle.

A branch of the family then came to Castellón by virtue of the Castilian origin of Valderrodilla, Soria Province and settled in Ávila, Madrid and Jaén. There is a connection to the Canary Islands, particularly Santa Cruz de Tenerife where they founded the Urquía home.

== Coat of arms ==
Armorial bearings consist Urquía house:

The first: In a foil cross Gules (red), a band of gold (symbol of knighthood and cross from the right shoulder) pompous in dredger (2 dragons) Vert (green, is a symbol of strength) and accompanied on top of a silver arm with a silver dagger and a gold lining.

The second, is a red field with two golden lion heads dripping blood. Gold, Vert, a hazel, golden fruit, with a greyhound argent at the foot of the stem. Bordure gules of eight scallops argent.

== Distribution of the Surname ==
As with many Basque surnames, the surname spread with Spanish migration throughout the former Spanish territories in the Americas. The name today is found throughout Latin America, notably in Honduras. In Asia the name is also found in Guam and in the Philippines, where Urquia's are known to be a mix of Filipinos, Honduran, Puerto Rican, Italian and other origins.
