= ULMA Handling Systems =

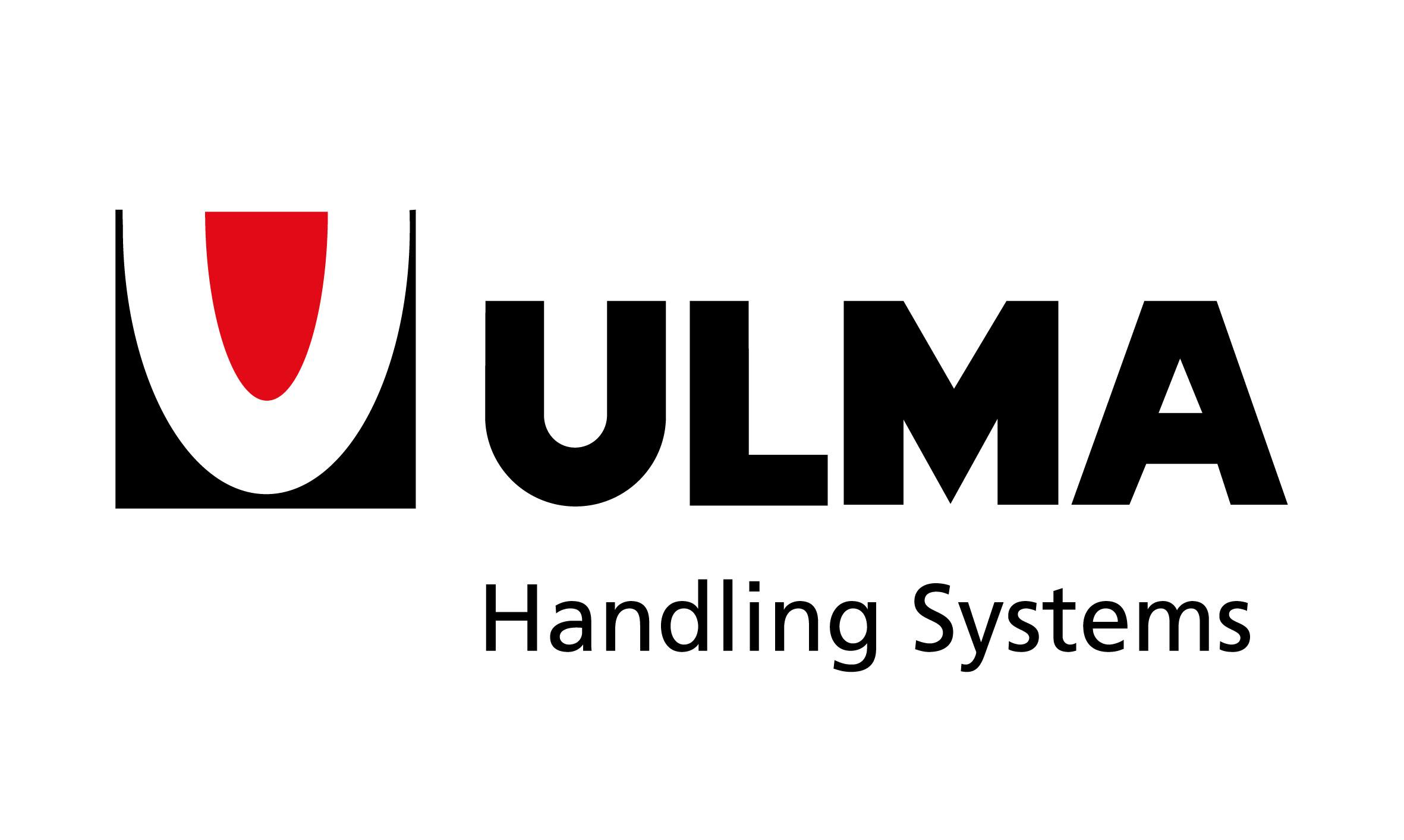

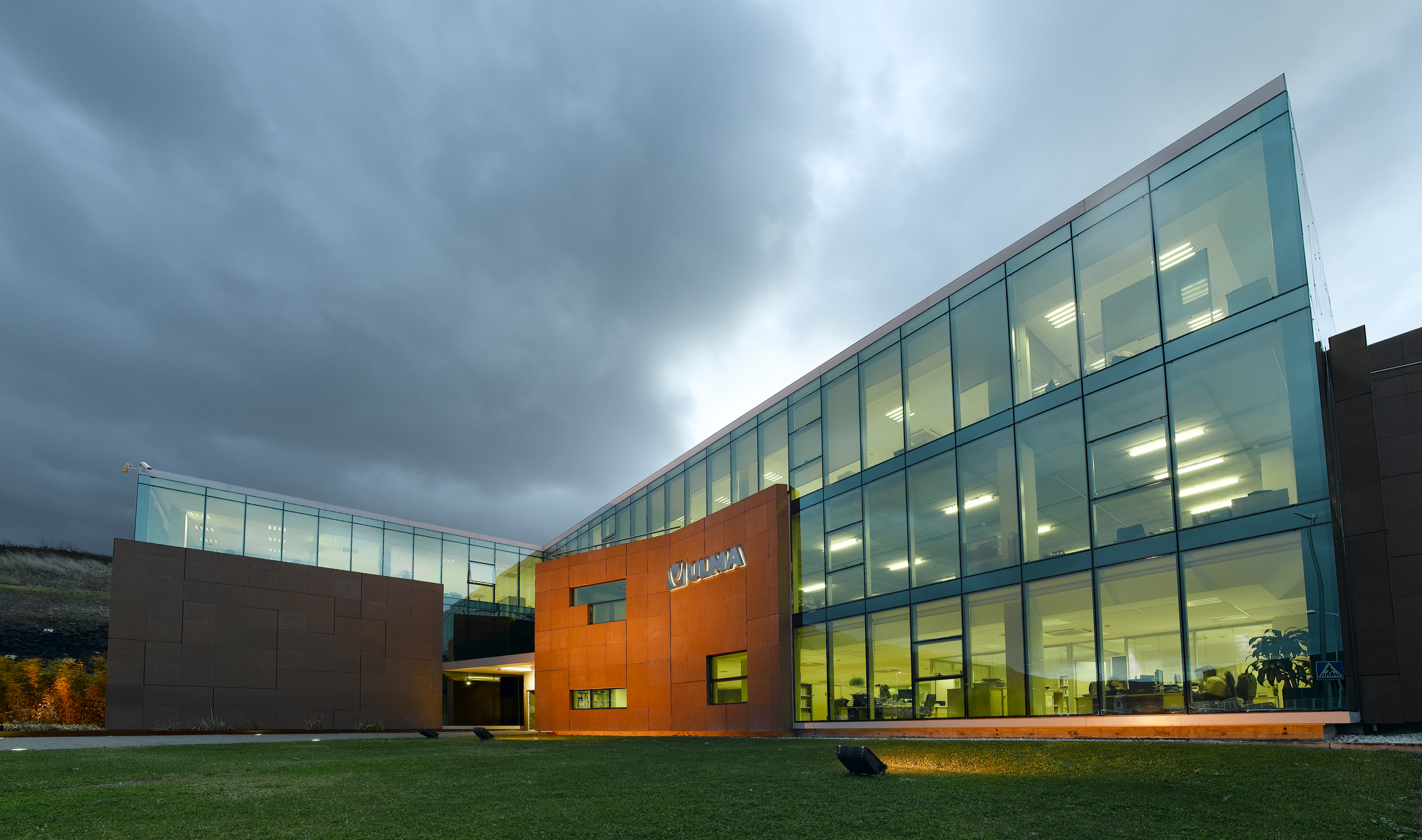
- ULMA Handling Systems Headquarter
- Company type: Cooperative
- Industry: Material Handling
- Founded: 1988
- Headquarters: Oñati, Spain
- Area served: Worldwide
- Key people: Álvaro Martínez de Lagos (Managing director)
- Subsidiaries: Spain, France, Netherlands and Brazil

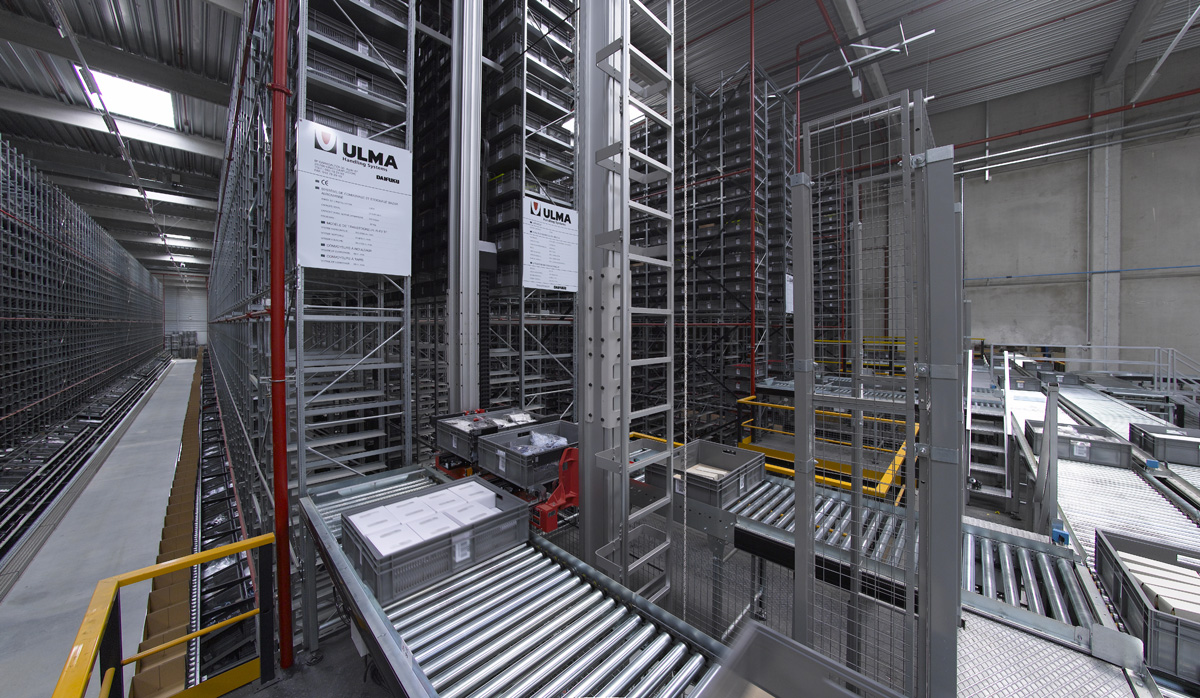
Automated storage and retrieval system for boxes (Mini Load)

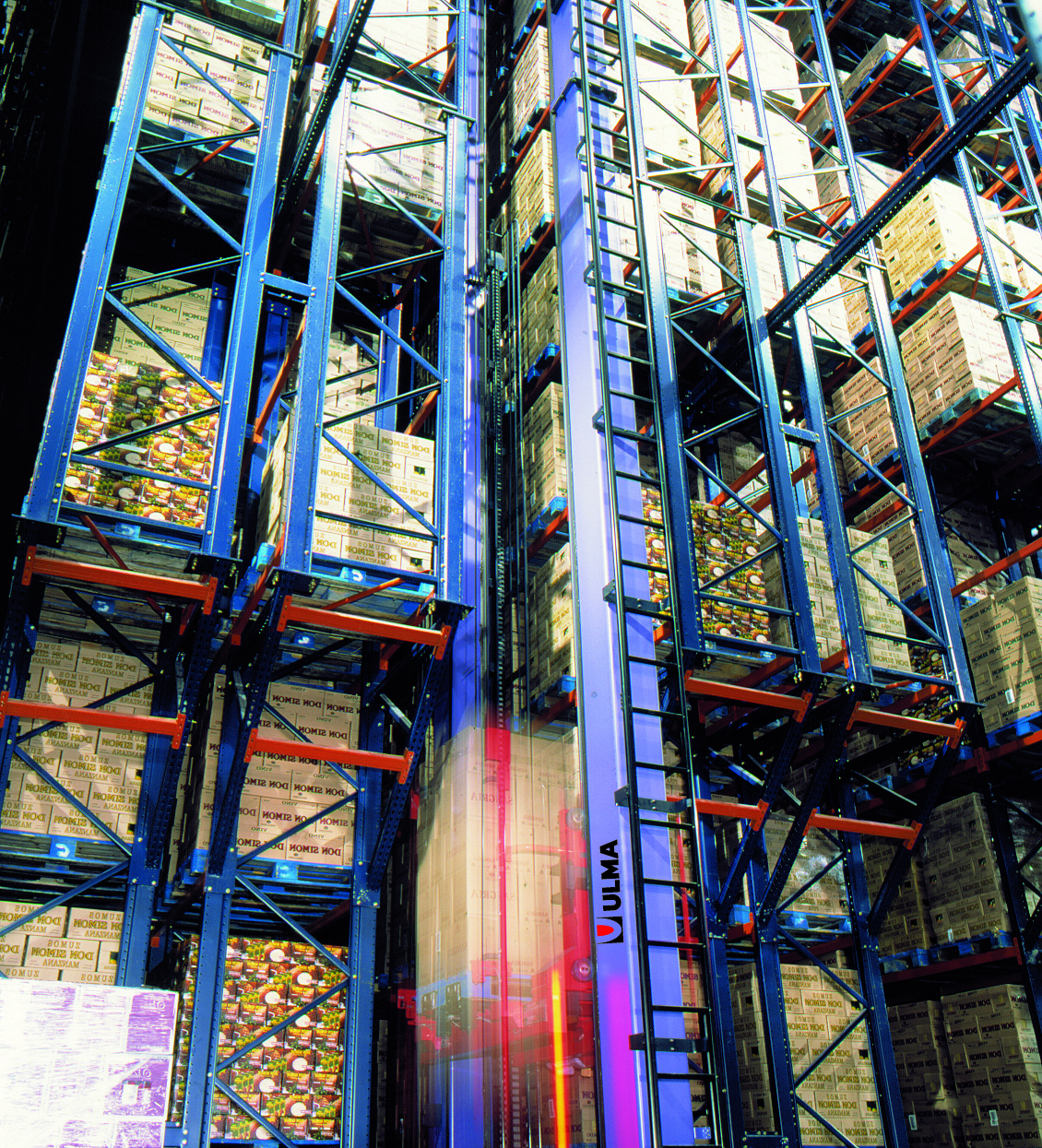
Automated storage and retrieval system for pallets (Unit Load)

ULMA Handling Systems is a material handling and logistics automation company, supplier of automated storage and retrieval systems, based in Oñati, Spain. The company engineers design, produce, and install material handling systems in installations, from small warehouses to complex systems.

== Corporate information ==
The firm has operational subsidiaries in several countries

- ULMA Handling Systems Coslada (Madrid), Spain
- ULMA Handling Systems Vic (Barcelona), Spain
- ULMA Handling Systems Alfafar (Valencia), Spain
- ULMA Handling Systems Paris, France
- ULMA Handling Systems Arnhem, Netherlands
- ULMA Handling Systems São Paulo, Brazil

== History ==
ULMA Handling Systems is one of the 9 companies which make up ULMA Group, which dates back to 1957 when six young mechanics set up a small workshop in Oñati (Guipúzcoa). In 1988 was founded ULMA Handling Systems, after a technology transfer agreement was signed with the Japanese company Daifuku for the sale and introduction of automatic material handling.

In 1997, the company broke into overseas markets installing warehouses in Brazil, France and Italy and nowadays has subsidiaries in Spain, France, the Netherlands, Brazil, Chile and Peru.

== Products and services ==
The company designs material handling systems involving automatic movements of the products, improving the productivity rates and the efficiency of the warehouses.

The company develops order picking solutions, automated storage and retrieval systems (AS/RS), conveyor and automated guided vehicles, automated sorting solutions and end of line solutions. ULMA Handling Systems offers from logistics consulting, planning, design to after sales service.

In addition, the company provides warehouse management software which guarantees the optimization and optimum control of all the movements of the goods that are located into the warehouse. It also offers baggage handling solutions, designing and developing integral solutions and health logistics solutions, such as storage of medication and its dispensing.
