= ULMA Construction =

Spanish business

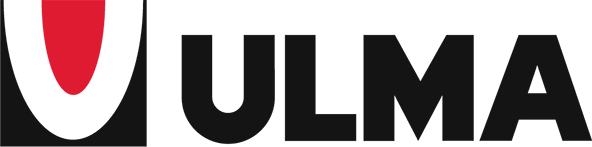
- Company type: Cooperative
- Industry: Construction
- Founders: Pedro Ugarte; Esteban Lizarralde; Julián Lizarralde; Isidro Mendiola; Ignacio Maiztegi; Julián Ayastu
- Headquarters: Oñati, Spain
- Area served: Worldwide
- Key people: Raúl García (president); Aitor Ayastuy (general director)
- Products: Construction, formwork, scaffolding
- Number of employees: 2,025 (2021)
- Subsidiaries: 25
- Website: www.ulmaconstruction.com

ULMA Construction is a Spanish company that produces and distributes industrialized formwork and scaffolding systems for building, civil works, and rehabilitation. Ulma is operating in 80 countries on five continents through the rental and sale of its services and products, technical project development, and on-site consultancy.

== History ==
ULMA Construction was founded in 1961 in Oñati (Guipúzcoa), as Sociedad Cooperativa Industrial Talleres ULMA, engaged in the manufacture of packaging. In 1963 it started working in the building sector and introduced the first pre-fabricated scaffolding.

Its global expansion began in Portugal (where the first subsidiary was created in 1980), France, Argentina and Chile. The cooperative split up into new businesses between 1984 and 1985: packaging and building. A year later, ENARA Cooperative joined them and they formed the Oñalán Group, renamed ULMA Group in 1992. The group has a presence in 80 countries, 4,500 employees, and a turnover of 700 million euros. By the end of 2021, ULMA Construction had 2,025 employees.

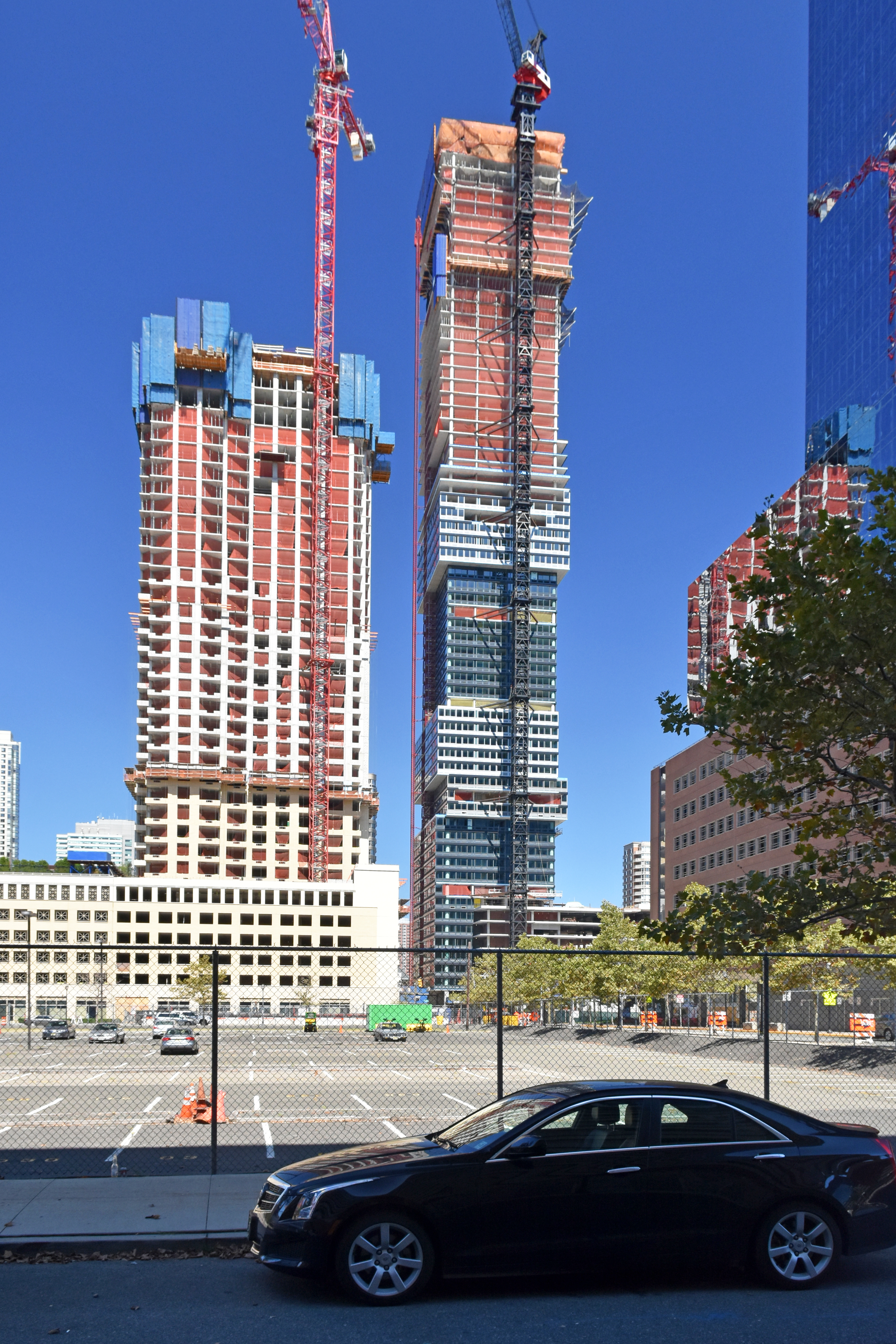
Harborside Tower, New York City

== Projects and works ==
ULMA Construction has carried out construction, rehabilitation, and maintenance of all kinds of buildings, such as bridges and viaducts to tunnels, hydraulic works and water treatment plants, as well as towers, high-rise buildings, schools and universities, stadiums, sacred and corporate buildings.

It has safety systems certified by renowned companies such as GSV, AENOR, and AIDICO. These guarantee the collective protection of workers on-site, with working platforms for the formwork of walls and pillars, access ladders to the different work areas, scaffolding and walkways for work at height, and perimeter protection systems (inside holes or slabs edges).

=== Works carried out with ULMA Construction Formwork ===
- Hudson Yards, New York City, United States. Central building construction, comprising four elevator shafts, in 10 Hudson Yards.
- Port of Bayovar, (Peru). Construction of two large silos in one of the biggest South American phosphate fields.
- Estádio Nacional Mané Garrincha (Brasilia, Brazil). Construction of the compression ring.
- Prague Metro, Prague (Czech Republic). Technical service support for the widest tunnel in the Czech Republic.
- El Cajón Dam, Grande de Santiago River (México).
- Palace of Versailles, Paris, (France). Restoration of the roof over the Ambassador's Staircase.
- La Pepa Bridge, Bay of Cádiz (Spain). Construction of several deck sections in the world's second tallest bridge.
- Harborside, Jersey City (New Jersey). Construction work in the tallest residential buildings in New Jersey.
- Empire Outlets, New York City. Formwork and shoring systems in the commercial area, hotel, and parking lot in Staten Island.
- Museo Fundazione Prada, Milan (Italy). Formwork and shoring solutions for the walls and slabs of the Fondazione Prada Museum. This museum combines pre-existing industrial buildings with new ones.
- Milan Metro, Blu line, Milan (Italy). Refurbishment of the Argonne station on the new Milan Metropolitan Line.
- Atlantic Station, Atlanta (Georgia). In a former post office building converted into a mixed-use residential development, formwork systems were used in one of the towers and the parking lot.
- Jaworzno Power Station, Jaworzno (Poland). Engineering solutions, scaffolding, and formwork systems. The work on the powerhouse and the electrical and mechanical system's center was also monitored.
- Skyliner, Warsaw, Poland, specialized formwork systems for a 120m high skyscraper.
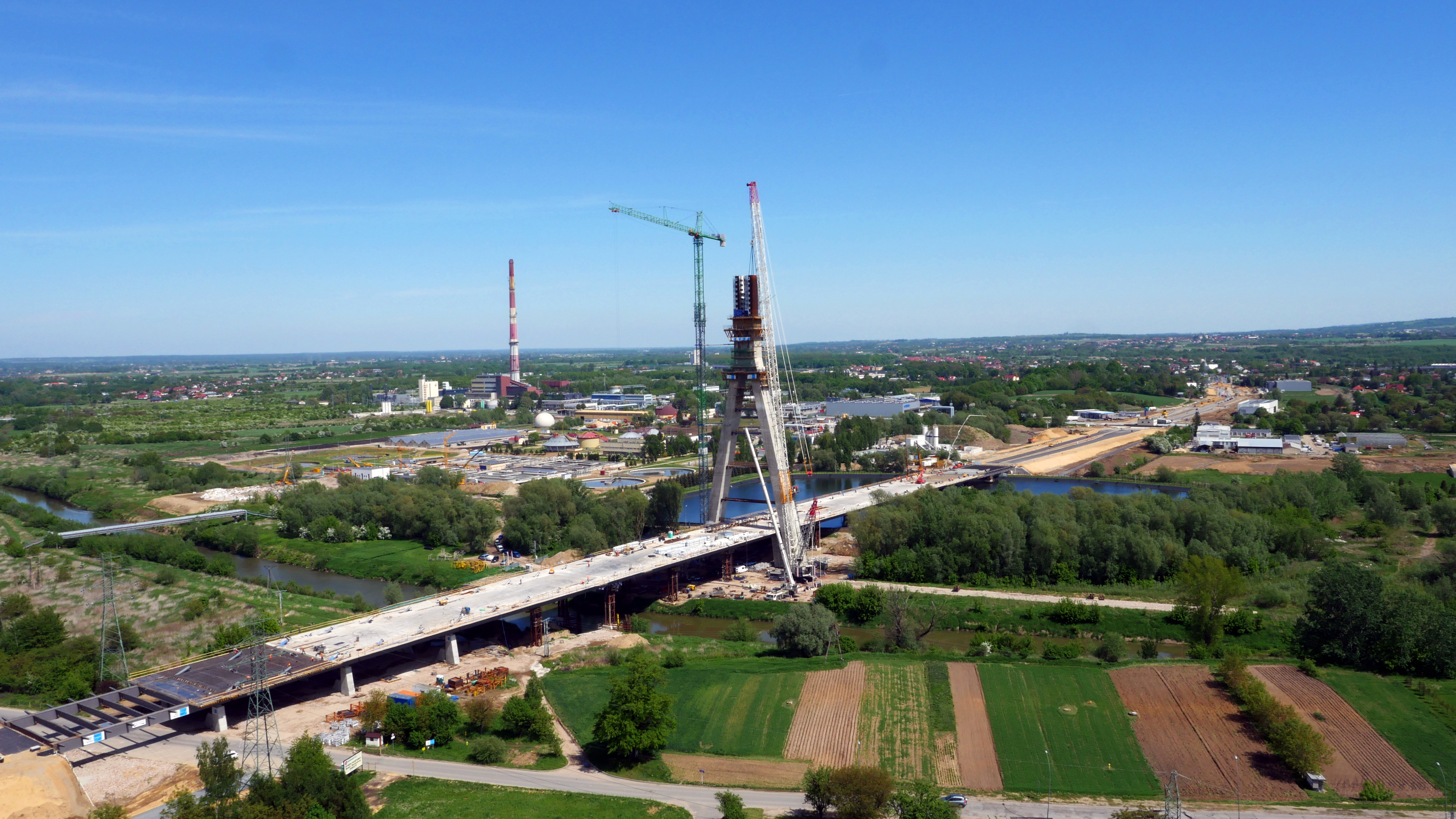
Wislok Bridge, Poland

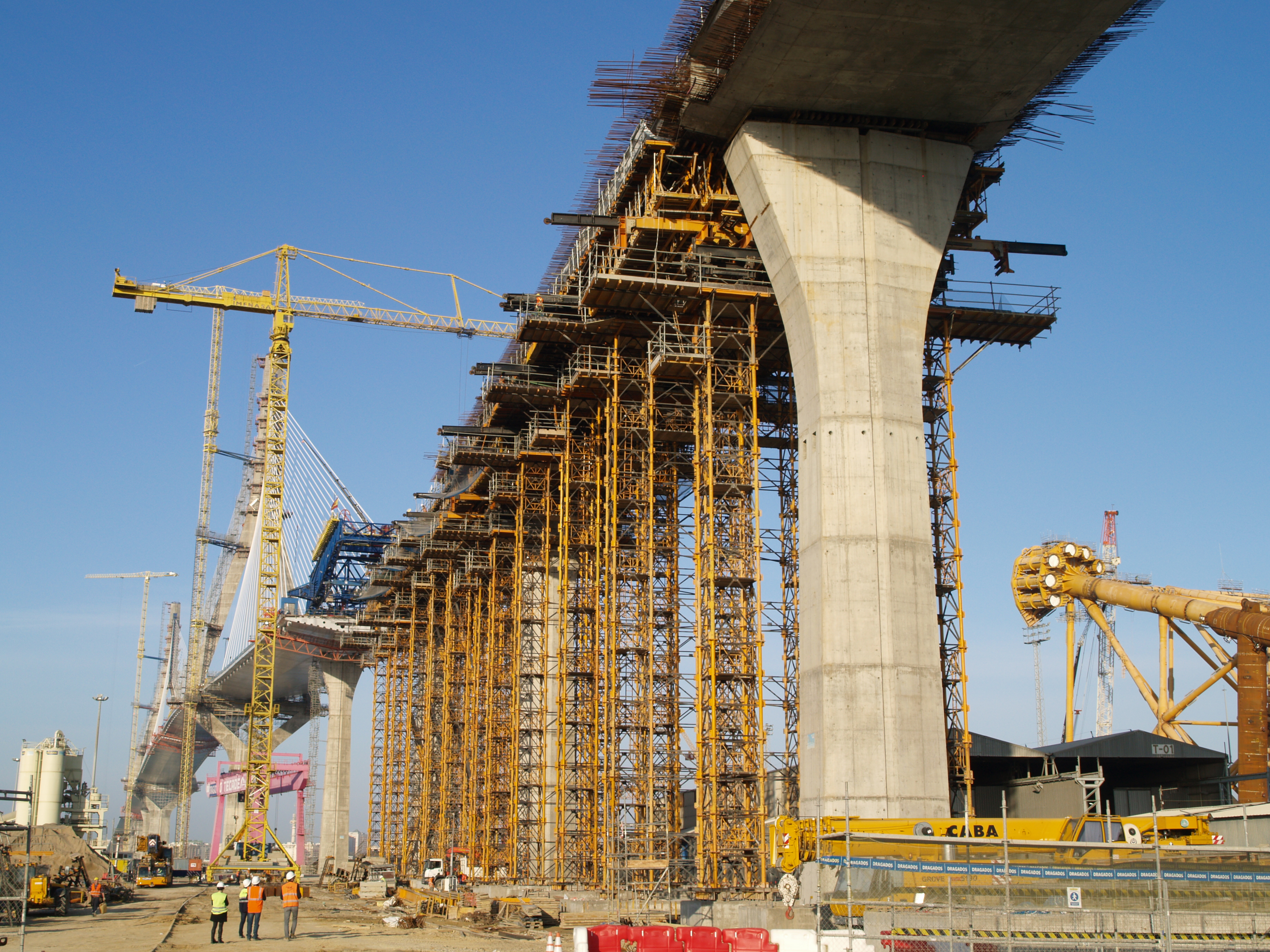
La Pepa Bridge, Cadiz (Spain)

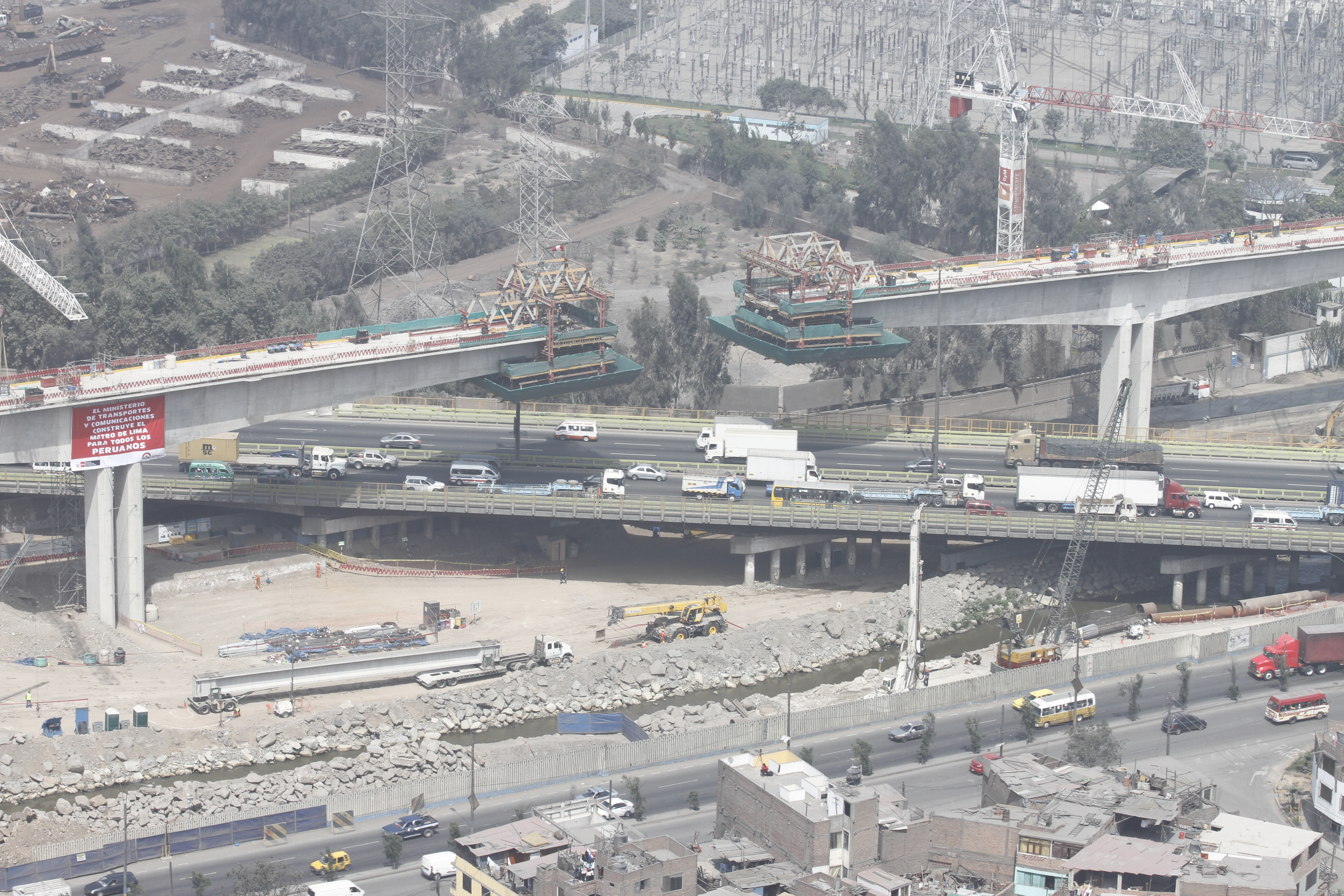
Lima Electric Train

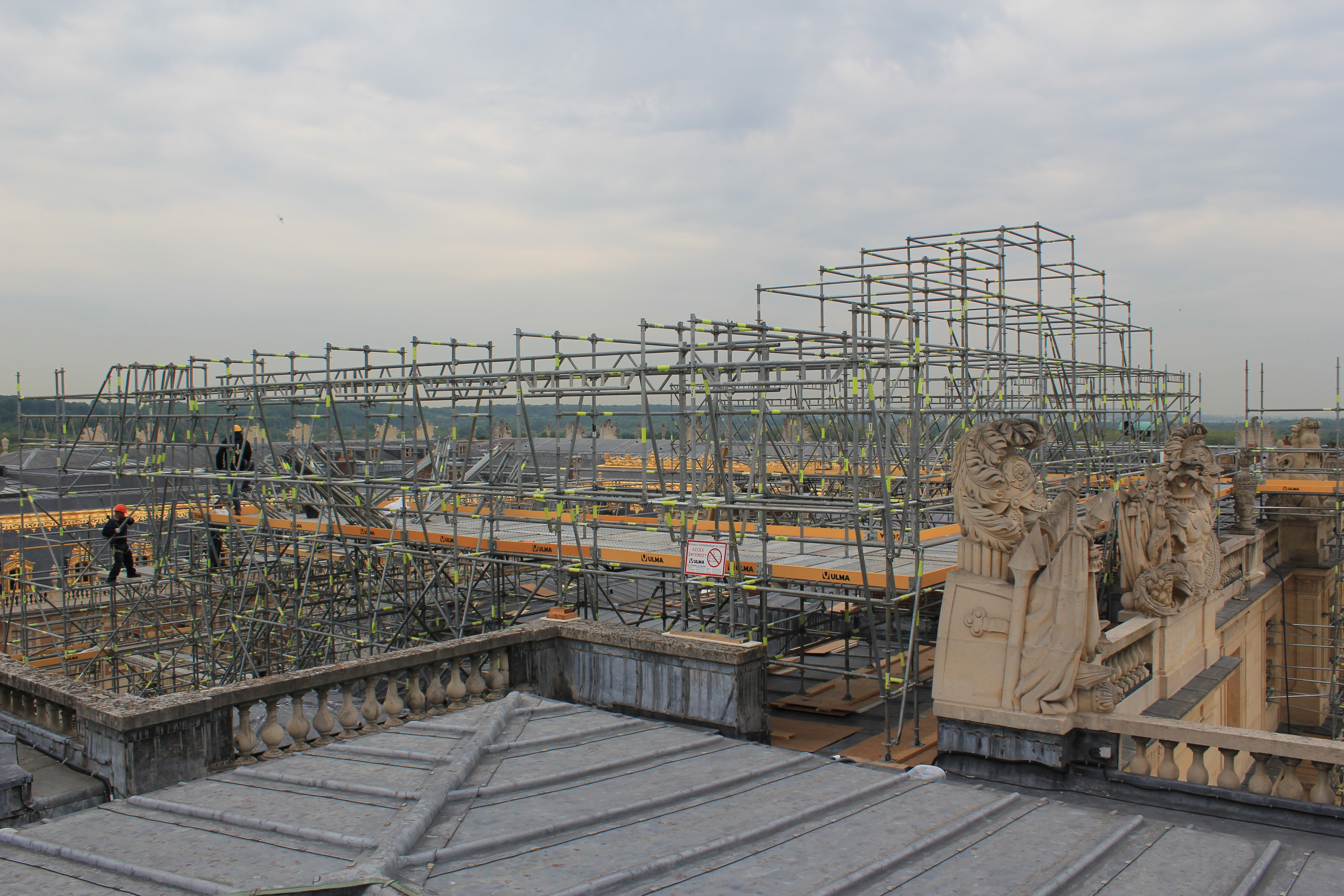
Palace of Versailles, restoration

== Social responsibility ==
In 2010, ULMA Construction contributed to the creation of the ULMA Foundation, donating 10% of its profits to social, sports, or socio-cultural projects of public interest in the Basque Country.
