= Valderrodilla =

- Municipality
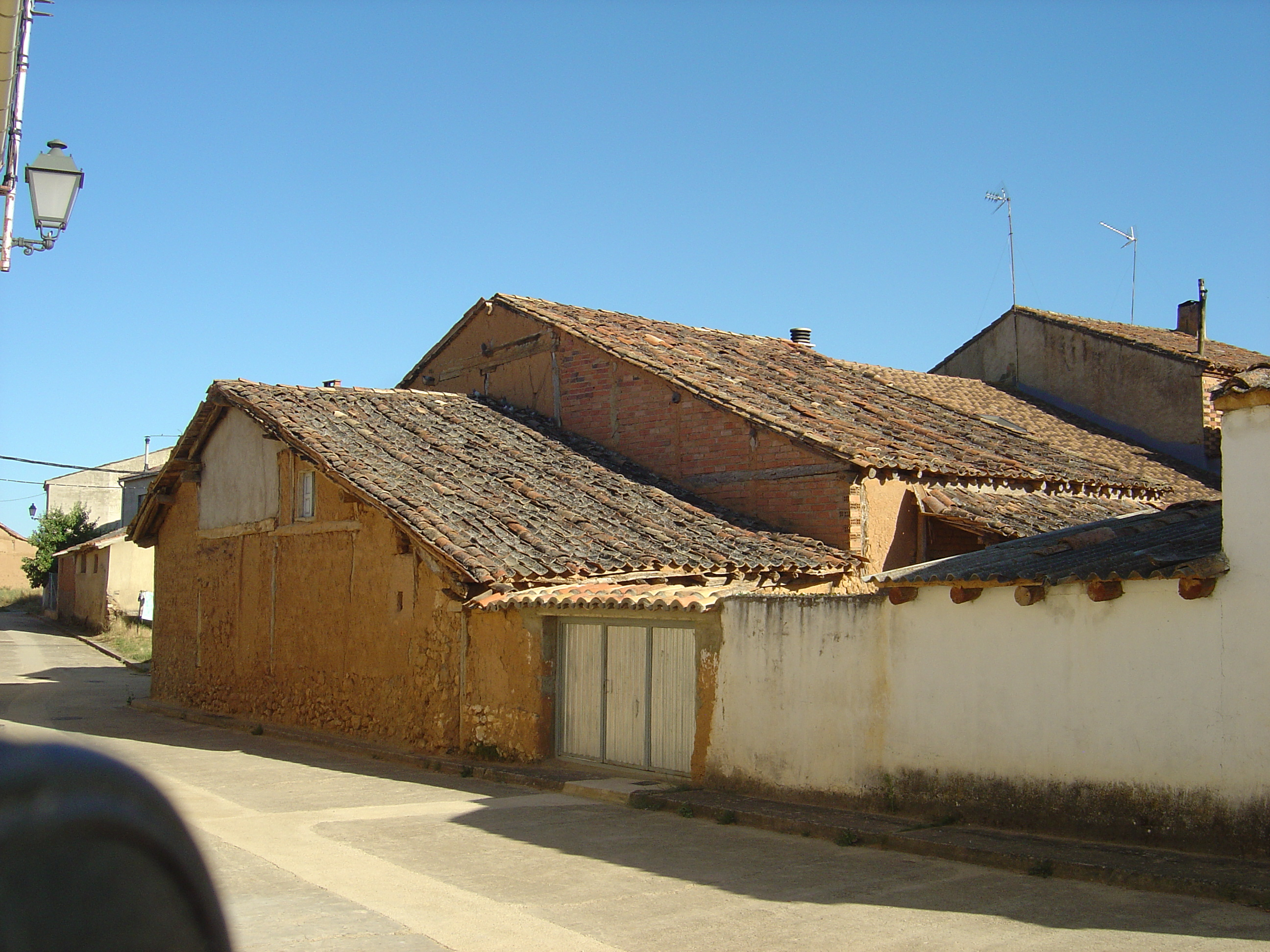
- Street of Valderrodilla

- Location in Spain. Valderrodilla (Spain)
- Coordinates: 41°33′50″N 2°48′29″W
- Country: Spain
- Autonomous community: Castile and León
- Province: Soria
- Municipality: Valderrodilla

Area
  - Total: 32 km^{2} (12 sq mi)

Population (2025-01-01)
  - Total: 59
  - Density: 1.8/km^{2} (4.8/sq mi)
- Time zone: UTC+1 (CET)
  - Summer (DST): UTC+2 (CEST)
- Website: Official website

Valderrodilla is a municipality located in the province of Soria, Castile and León, Spain. According to the 2004 census (INE), the municipality has a population of 111 inhabitants.
