= Oñati =

- Municipality
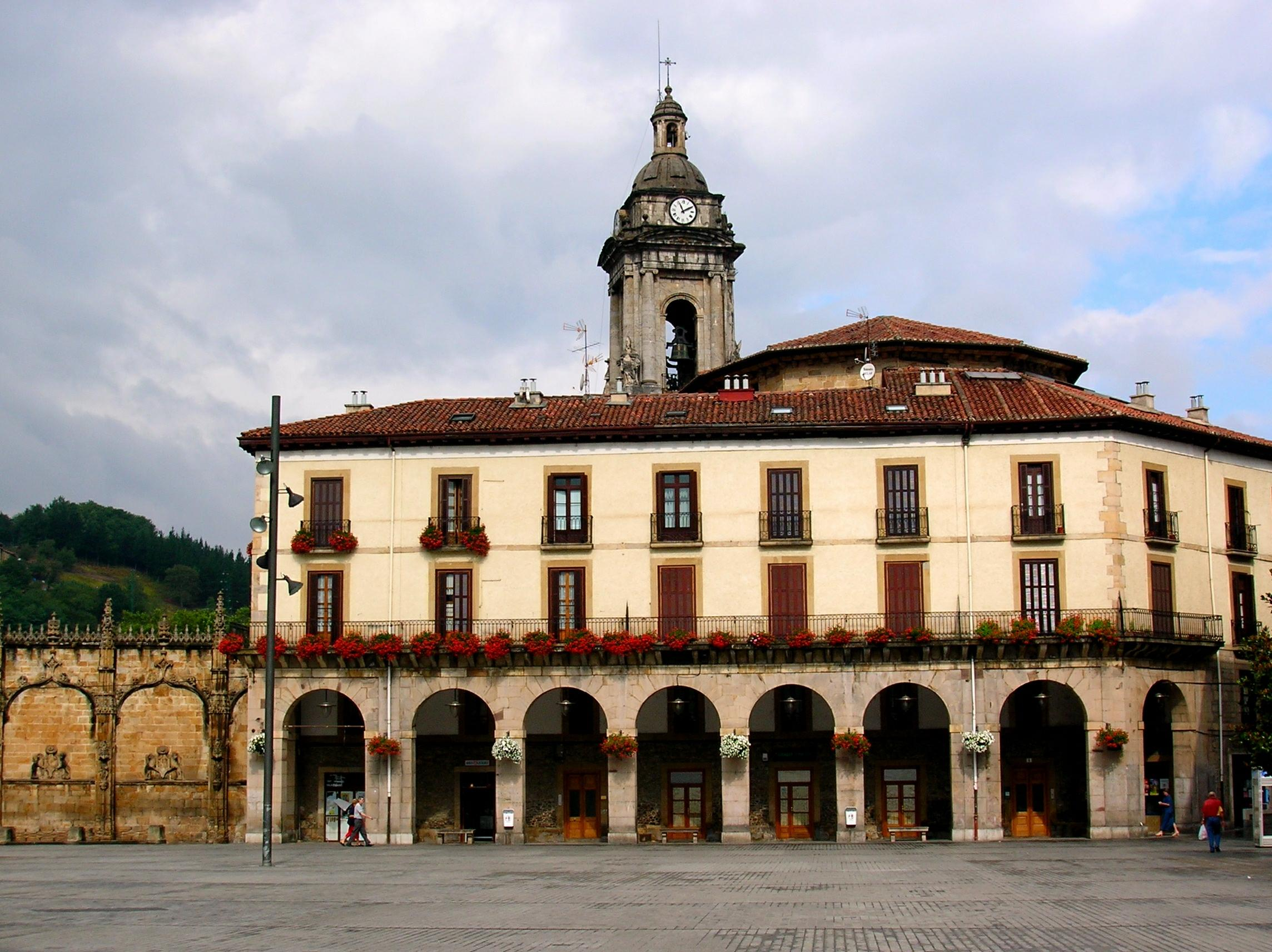

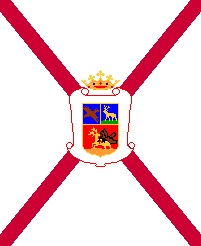
- Flag

- Location of Oñati within the Basque Autonomous Community Oñati (Spain)
- Coordinates: 43°02′N 02°25′W
- Country: Spain
- Autonomous community: Basque Country
- Province: Gipuzkoa
- Comarca: Debagoiena

Government
  - Mayor: Izaro Elorza

Area
  - Total: 100.31 km^{2} (38.73 sq mi)
- Elevation: 230 m (750 ft)

Population (2025-01-01)
  - Total: 11,480
  - Density: 114.4/km^{2} (296.4/sq mi)
- Demonym: Oñatiarra
- Time zone: UTC+1 (CET)
  - Summer (DST): UTC+2 (CEST)
- Postal code: 20560/20567/20568/20569
- Website: Official website

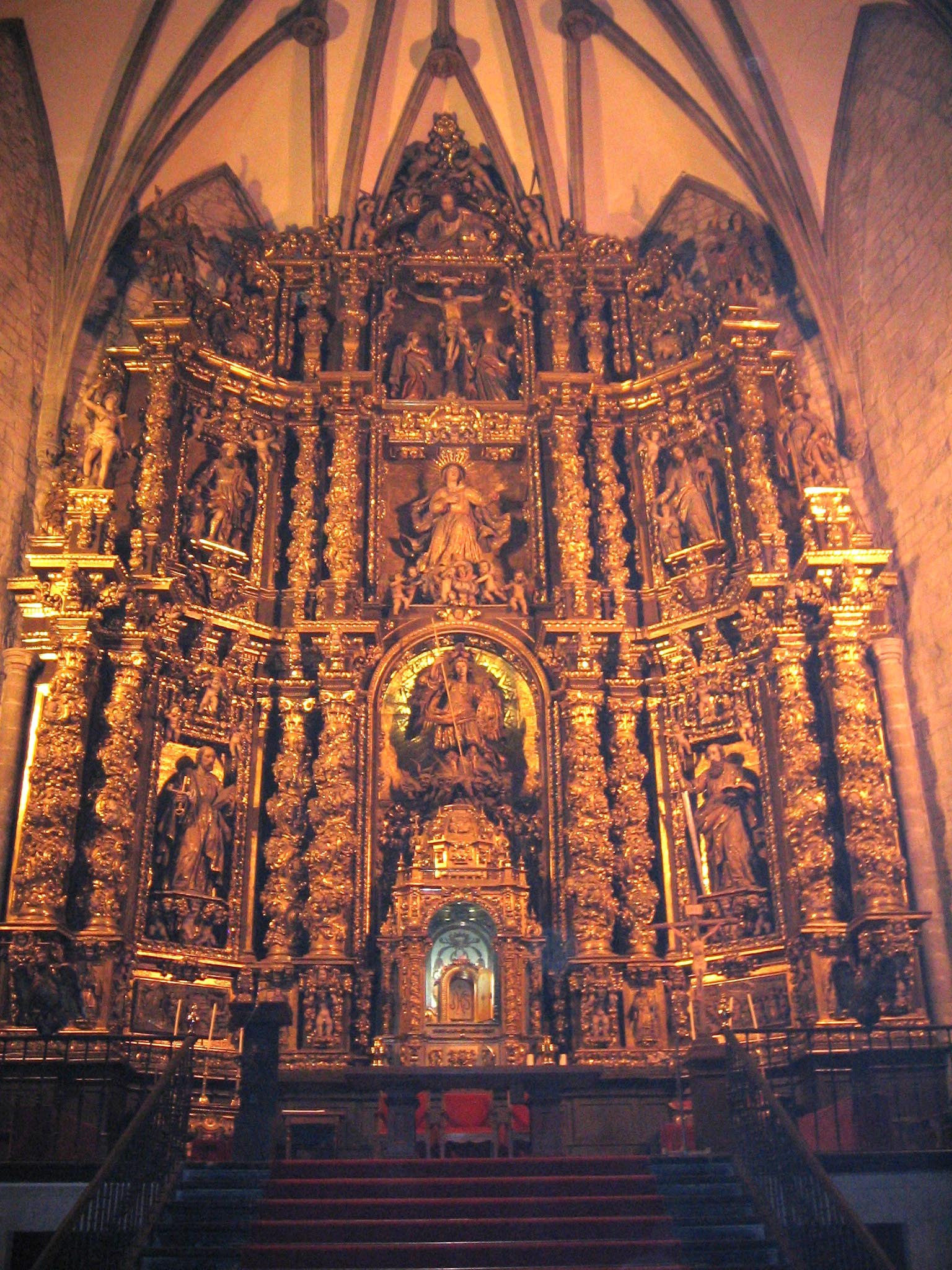
Altar of San Miguel Church, Oñati.

Oñati (Basque: Oñati, Spanish: Oñate) is a town located in the province of Gipuzkoa, in the autonomous community of the Basque Country, in the north of Spain. It has a population of approximately 10,500 and lies in a valley in the center of the Basque country. It lies about 40 kilometres (25 miles) south of the Bay of Biscay and is about 236 metres (774 feet) above sea level. The name is Basque and translates roughly as "place of many hills", reflecting the landscape of the area. The town is surrounded on three sides by green mountains on the southern side by the Aloña limestone formation.

== Main sights ==
Dating back to the Medieval period, Oñati is home to numerous monuments. The University of Oñati, the ancient university of the Basque Country, which is in the town's centre, is one of the oldest university buildings on the Iberian Peninsula. Today it houses the International Institute for the Sociology of Law. Other important sites include the monastery and hospice of Bidaurreta and the Church of Saint Michael.

Above the city lies the Sanctuary of Arantzazu, which is known for its Pilgrimage Church of Our Lady. A shepherd is said to have discovered a figure of the Virgin here in 1469. The original 16th-century chapel was replaced in 1950.

Oñati is also known for having hosted the Boise State University Campus in the Basque Country program at ETEO. The time was very volatile politically since it saw the death of Franco and the transition to a non dictatorial political system. Currently, the main campus of the Faculty of Business Studies of Mondragon University is in the town.

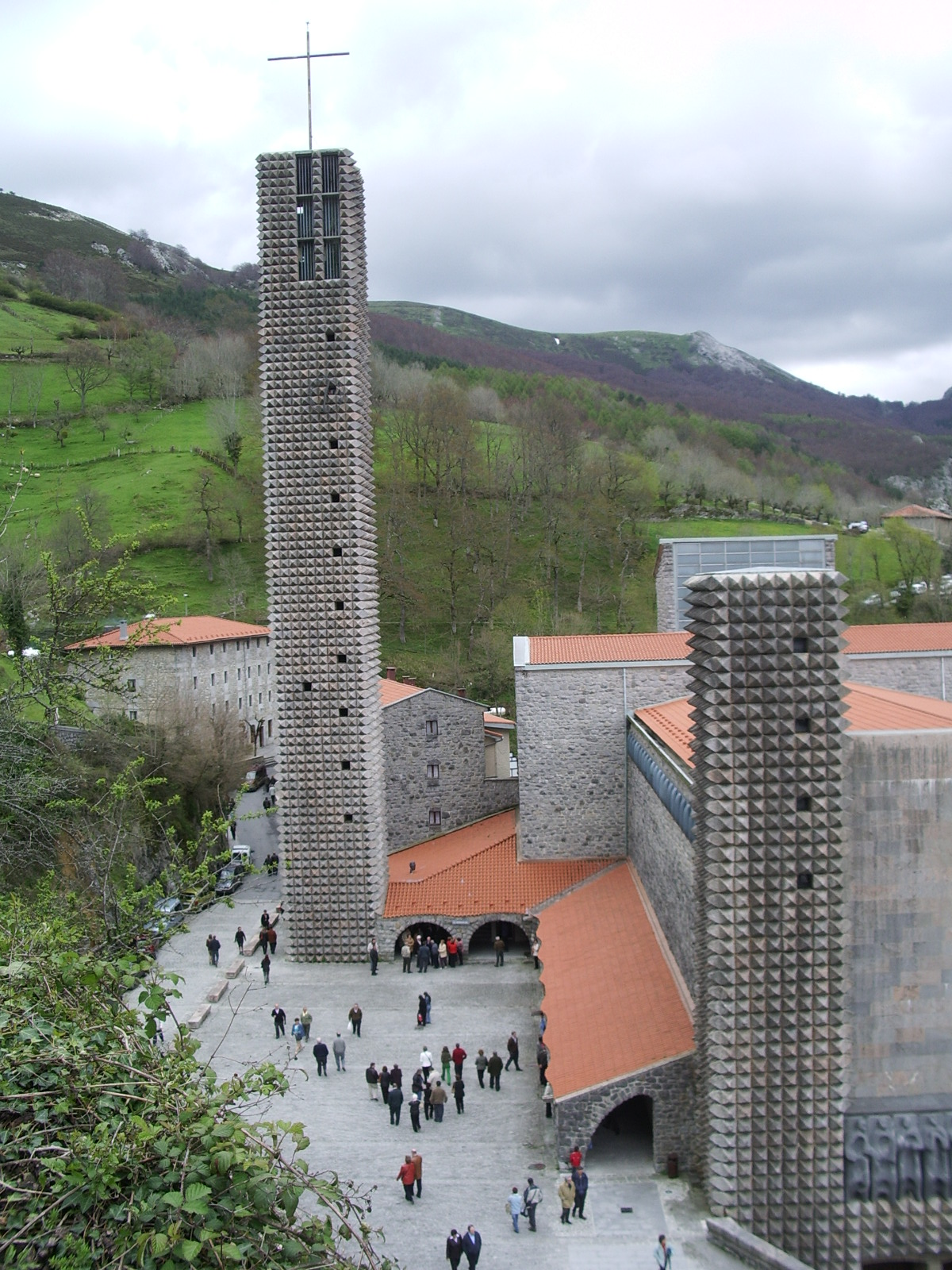
Church of Our Lady of Aránzazu

== International relations ==
=== Twin towns – Sister cities ===
Oñati is twinned with:

- Guadalajara, Mexico

== Notable people ==
- Lope de Aguirre (1510–1561), conquistador
- Maria Cruickshank (born 1989), actress

== See also ==
- Urquía, surname which originated in the municipalities of Isasondo and Arautz (now Oñati)
