= IRS targeting controversy =

2013 American tax administration scandal

The logo of the Internal Revenue Service

In 2013, the United States Internal Revenue Service (IRS), under the Obama administration, revealed that it had selected political groups applying for tax-exempt status for intensive scrutiny based on their names or political themes. This led to wide condemnation of the agency and triggered several investigations, including a Federal Bureau of Investigation (FBI) criminal probe ordered by United States Attorney General Eric Holder. Conservatives claimed that they were specifically targeted by the IRS, but an exhaustive report released by the Treasury Department's Inspector General in 2017 found that from 2004 to 2013, the IRS used both conservative and liberal keywords to choose targets for further scrutiny.

Initial reports described the selections as nearly exclusively of conservative groups with terms such as "Tea Party" in their names. According to Republican lawmakers, liberal-leaning groups and the Occupy movement had also triggered additional scrutiny, but at a lower rate than conservative groups. The Republican majority on the House Oversight Committee issued a report, which concluded that although some liberal groups were selected for additional review, the scrutiny that these groups received did not amount to targeting when compared to the greater scrutiny received by conservative groups. The report was criticized by the committee's Democratic minority, which said that the report ignored evidence that the IRS used keywords to identify both liberal and conservative groups.

In January 2014, James Comey, who at the time was the FBI director, told Fox News that its investigation had found no evidence so far warranting the filing of federal criminal charges in connection with the controversy, as it had not found any evidence of "enemy hunting", and that the investigation continued. On October 23, 2015, the Justice Department declared that no criminal charges would be filed. On September 8, 2017, the Trump Justice Department declined to reopen the criminal investigation into Lois Lerner, a central figure in the controversy.

In October 2017, the Trump administration agreed to settle a lawsuit filed on behalf of more than four hundred conservative nonprofit groups who claimed that they had been discriminated against by the Internal Revenue Service for an undisclosed amount described by plaintiffs' counsel as "very substantial." The Trump administration also agreed to settle a second lawsuit brought by forty-one conservative organizations with an apology and an admission from the IRS that subjecting them to "heightened scrutiny and inordinate delays" was wrongful.

== Background ==
=== Tax exemption and donor anonymity ===
United States federal tax law, specifically Section 501(c)(4) of the Internal Revenue Code (26 U.S.C. § 501(c)), exempts certain types of nonprofit organizations from having to pay federal income tax. The statutory language of IRC 501(c)(4) generally requires civic organizations described in that section to be "operated exclusively for the promotion of social welfare". Treasury regulations interpreting this statutory language apply a more relaxed standard, namely, that the organization "is operated primarily for the purpose of bringing about civic betterments and social improvements". As a result, the IRS traditionally has permitted organizations described in IRC 501(c)(4) to engage in lobbying and political campaign activities if those activities are not the organization's primary activity.

Internal Revenue Service rules also protect groups organized under Section 501(c)(4) as nonprofit organizations dedicated to social welfare from having to reveal the names of their donors or the amount of funds the individual donors have contributed. This protection dates back to the United States Supreme Court's 1958 ruling in NAACP v. Alabama, when the Court held that disclosure of names could render private donors vulnerable to retaliation.

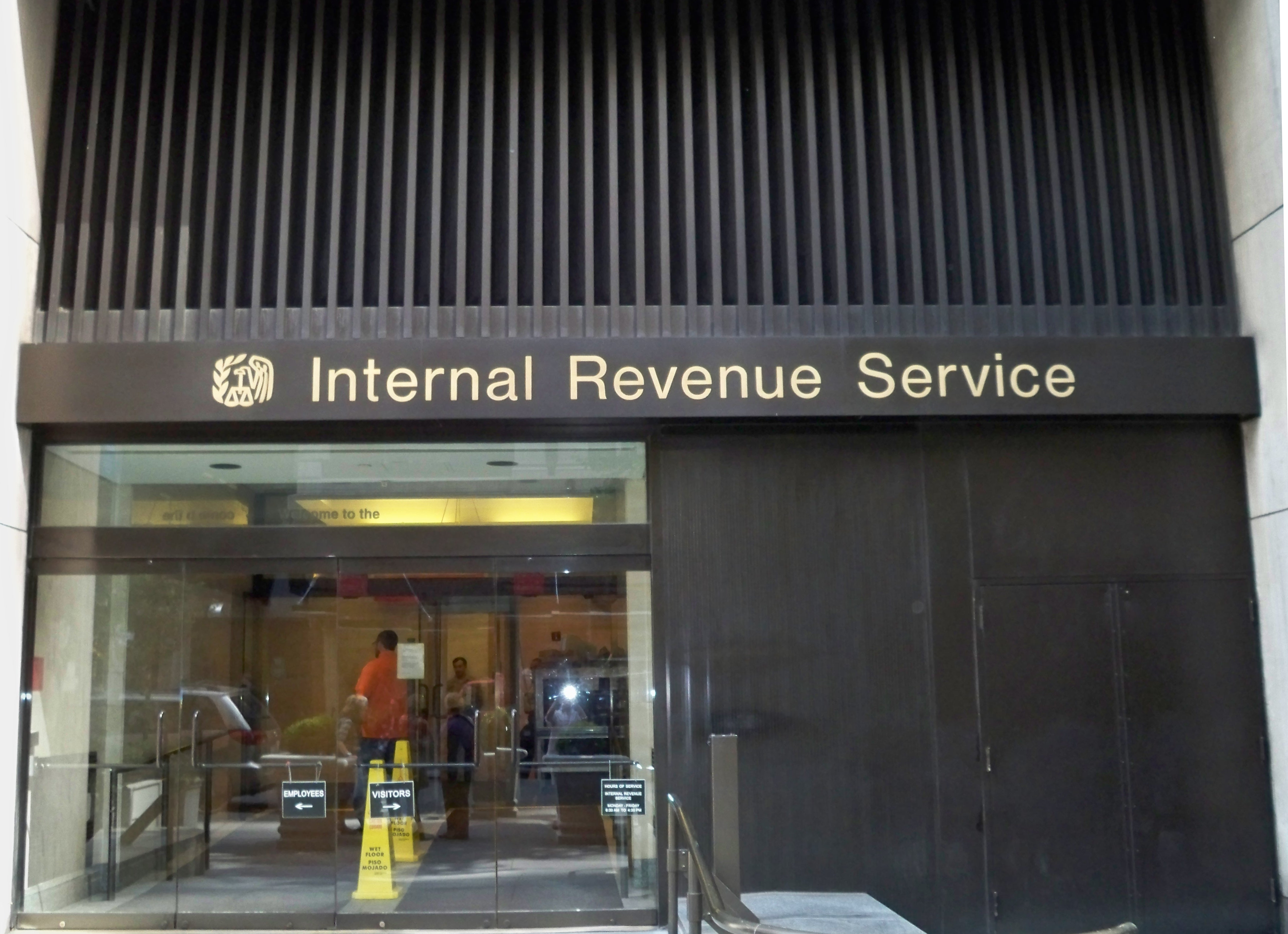
Exterior of an Internal Revenue Service office.

Nonprofit organizations dedicated to social welfare are not required to apply for IRS certification in order to operate under Section 501(c)(4) tax exemption rules. However, being certified by the IRS can help organizations attract more donations and provide some protection against further scrutiny.

In 2013, examples of 501(c)(4) groups included Organizing for Action, organized to promote President Obama's legislative priorities, and the conservative advocacy organization Crossroads GPS, founded in part by Karl Rove. (Note: Although Crossroads GPS is organized as a self-declared 501(c)(4) organization, its application reportedly had not yet been approved by mid-May 2013 when the Treasury Department Inspector General for Tax audit report was released, and Organizing for Action had not applied for IRS tax-exempt certification.)

=== Citizens United ruling and Congressional requests for 501(c) investigations ===
On January 21, 2010, the U.S. Supreme Court decided Citizens United v. Federal Election Commission, which overturned many previous restrictions on political campaign spending and allowed nearly unlimited and often anonymous spending by corporations and other groups to influence elections. Some Tea Party leaders began forming political action committees as offshoots of their 501(c)-tax-exempt organizations. By late September 2010, tax-exempt non-profit groups had spent in excess of $100 million on the mid-term elections, more than double the expenditure from a similar point in the election cycle four years earlier.

Public-interest advocacy groups such as Public Citizen and Democracy 21 complained that the IRS and Federal Election Commission were failing to provide adequate oversight for 501(c) nonprofit organizations that were pouring money into political campaigns. As The New York Times reported at the time:

Almost all of the biggest players among third-party groups, in terms of buying television time in House and Senate races since August, have been 501(c) organizations, and their purchases have heavily favored Republicans....

They include 501(c)(4) "social welfare" organizations, like Crossroads, which has been the top spender on Senate races, and Americans for Prosperity, another pro-Republican group that has been the leader on the House side; 501(c)(5) labor unions, which have been supporting Democrats; and 501(c)(6) trade associations, like the United States Chamber of Commerce, which has been spending heavily in support of Republicans.

Shortly thereafter, Senator Max Baucus, Democratic chair of the Senate Finance Committee, referring to The New York Times and other media reports, asked the IRS to investigate to ensure that nonprofit organizations engaged in political activity were complying with IRS rules and not abusing their tax-exempt status. Republican senators on the finance committee Orrin Hatch and Jon Kyl responded to Baucus' request by writing to the IRS that they were worried this kind of investigation would violate First Amendment rights, and they asked that a Treasury Department inspector general conduct a review of any such investigation to ensure its impartiality.

Senate and House Democrats in early 2012 continued to press the IRS to investigate abuses of 501(c)(4) tax-exempt status by organizations engaged in political activity. In a February 2012 letter to then-IRS Commissioner Douglas Shulman, several Democratic senators led by Senator Chuck Schumer wrote, "We urge you to protect legitimate section 501(c)(4) entities by preventing non-conforming organizations that are focused on federal election activities from abusing the tax code." The senators also urged the IRS to issue new rules to prevent this type of abuse. In a follow-up letter sent in March 2012, the senators asked the IRS to clearly define the amount of political activity that is permissible for "social welfare" groups under 501(c)(4) rules, to require the groups to document in their IRS filings the exact percentage of their activity that is dedicated to "social welfare", and to require the groups to notify their donors of what percentage of donations could be claimed for tax deductions. The senators promised to introduce legislation to accomplish these aims if the IRS did not do so itself by promptly issuing new administrative rules. None of these letters called for the targeting of groups on the basis of political ideology.

Between 2010 and 2012, the number of applications the IRS received each year seeking 501(c)(4) certification doubled. During this period, budget cuts and personnel cuts reduced the IRS's ability to adequately perform its core duties. When the Obama administration requested in 2011 that Congress increase the IRS's $12.1 billion budget by $1 billion to allow the agency to hire 5,100 additional agents, Congress instead reduced the IRS budget to $11.8 billion, and the IRS offered buyouts to 5,400 of its 95,000 employees. The U.S. National Taxpayer Advocate, Nina E. Olson, told The New York Times in January 2012, "The overriding challenge facing the I.R.S. is that its workload has grown significantly in recent years, while its funding is being cut.... This is causing the I.R.S. to resort to shortcuts that undermine fundamental taxpayer rights and harm taxpayers—and at the same time reduces the I.R.S.'s ability to deliver on its core mission of raising revenue."

== Controversial IRS conduct ==
=== Controversial intensive scrutiny of political groups ===
Beginning in March 2010, the IRS more closely scrutinized certain organizations applying for tax-exempt status under sections 501(c)(3) and 501(c)(4) of the Internal Revenue Code by focusing on groups with certain words in their names. In May 2010, some employees of the "Determinations Unit" of the Cincinnati office of the IRS, which is tasked with reviewing applications pertaining to tax-exempt status, began developing a spreadsheet that became known as the "Be On the Look Out" ("BOLO") list.

The list, first distributed in August 2010, suggested intensive scrutiny of applicants with names related to a number of political causes, including names related to the Tea Party movement and other conservative causes. Eventually, IRS employees in Ohio, California, and Washington, D.C. applied closer scrutiny to applications from organizations that:

- referenced words such as "Tea Party", "Patriots", or "9/12 Project", "progressive," "occupy," "Israel," "open source software," "medical marijuana" and "occupied territory advocacy" in the case file;
- outlined issues in the application that included government spending, government debt, or taxes;
- involved advocating or lobbying to "make America a better place to live";
- had statements in the case file that criticized how the country is being run;
- advocated education about the Constitution and the Bill of Rights;
- were focused on challenging the Patient Protection and Affordable Care Act—known by many as Obamacare;
- questioned the integrity of federal elections.

Over the two years between April 2010 and April 2012, the IRS essentially placed on hold the processing of applications for 501(c)(4) tax-exemption status received from organizations with "Tea Party", "patriots", or "9/12" in their names. While apparently none of these organizations' applications were denied during this period, (Note: The Treasury Inspector General for Tax Administration's audit found (page 14): "For the 296 potential political cases we reviewed, as of December 17, 2012, 108 applications had been approved, 28 were withdrawn by the applicant, none had been denied, and 160 cases were open from 206 to 1,138 calendar days (some crossing two election cycles)." Bloomberg News reported on May 14, 2013, "None of the Republican groups have said their applications were rejected.") only 4 were approved. During the same general period, the agency approved applications from several dozen presumably liberal-leaning organizations whose names included terms such as "progressive", "progress", "liberal", or "equality". However, the IRS also selected several progressive- or Democratic-leaning organizations for increased scrutiny. An affiliate of the liberal group Emerge America had its request for tax-exempt status denied, leading to a review (and the eventual revocation) of the larger Emerge America organization's tax-exempt status. The conservative National Review states that a November 2010 version of the IRS's BOLO list indicates that liberal and conservative groups were in fact treated differently because liberal groups could be approved for tax-exempt status by line agents, while tea party groups could not.

Ryan Chittum of the Columbia Journalism Review reported in 2011 that a number of non-profit news organizations saw their applications delayed for years after being flagged for additional review. In 2013, Chittum linked that scrutiny to the investigation, reporting that non-profit news organizations and Tea Party groups were placed in the same "Emerging Issues" category by IRS reviewers, which was a category flagged for additional questioning. He stated that "Rather than the Nixonian conspiracy that George Will and The Wall Street Journal editorial page so darkly warned about—with zero evidence—you have a routine bureaucratic procedure meant to bundle potentially problematic applicants together for further review."

Media Trackers, a conservative organization, applied to the IRS for recognition of tax-exempt status, and received no response after waiting 16 months. When the organization's founder, Drew Ryun, applied for permanent tax-exempt status for an existing tax-exempt organization with what he said was a "liberal-sounding name" ("Greenhouse Solutions"), that application was approved in three weeks. Ryun has stated he believes that Greenhouse Solutions benefited from its name (although the quick approval might also be due to the fact that Greenhouse Solutions was already operating as a nonprofit and was already on-file with the IRS.)

An investigation by The New York Times reported that several organizations selected for scrutiny by the IRS engaged in activities that could be construed as political. The Ohio Liberty Coalition, whose application was delayed in excess of two years, sent emails to their members regarding Mitt Romney presidential campaign events and handed out Romney "door hangers" while canvassing neighborhoods. Former IRS officials and tax experts say this type of behavior would provide a "legitimate basis" for additional scrutiny. Ohio State University law professor Donald Tobin said: "While some of the I.R.S. questions may have been overbroad, you can look at some of these groups and understand why these questions were being asked."

==== Examples of questions from the IRS ====
Some flagged organizations were required to provide further documentation in requests that Rep. Bill Flores called "overreaching and impossible to comply with". Documentation requested varied among different groups but, in some cases, included copies of "any contracts" or "training material" the groups may have exchanged with Koch foundations. In one instance, the IRS asked for "summaries or copies of all material passed out at meetings." Several letters asked for "copies of the groups' Web pages, blog posts and social media postings." Organizations were informed that if they did not provide the information sought, they would not be certified as tax-exempt.

Another question asked of some unidentified applicants was:

Provide the following information for the income you received and raised for the years from inception to the present. Also, provide the same information for the income you expect to receive and raise for 2012, 2013, and 2014.

a. Donations, contributions, and grant income for each year, which includes the following information:

1. The names of the donors, contributors, and grantors. If the donor, contributor, or grantor has run or will run for a public office, identify the office. If not, please confirm by answering this question "No".
2. The amounts of each of the donations, contributions, and grants and the dates you received them.
3. How did you use these donations, contributions, and grants? Provide the details.

If you did not receive or do not expect to receive any donation, contribution, and grant income, please confirm by answering "None received" and/or "None expected".

Another unidentified applicant was asked to "Please provide copies of all your current web pages, including your Blog posts. Please provide copies of all of your newsletters, bulletins, flyers, newsletters or any other media or literature you have disseminated to your members or others. Please provide copies of stories and articles that have been published about you."

The Coalition for Life of Iowa, a group opposed to abortion rights, was asked to "Please explain how all of your activities, including the prayer meetings held outside of Planned Parenthood are considered educational as defined under 501(c)(3). Organizations exempt under 501(c)(3) may present opinions with scientific or medical facts. Please explain in detail the activities at these prayer meetings. Also, please provide the percentage of time your group spends on prayer groups as compared with other activities of the organization." While questioning then-Acting Commissioner of the IRS, Steven T. Miller, on May 17, 2013, Congressman Aaron Schock (R-IL), referring to a report by the conservative, non-profit law firm, the Thomas More Society, misquoted one of the questions asked of the coalition as "please detail the content of the members of your organization's prayers." Schock went on to ask, "Would that be an inappropriate question to a 501(c)(3) applicant? The content of one's prayers?" Miller replied, "It pains me to say I can't speak to that one either." Upon further questioning by Schock, Miller stated that it would "surprise him" if that question were asked. Schock's characterization of the question was included in news reports and was repeated by conservative commentators. However, the Thomas More Society chose to publish the questions that were asked by the IRS. These included a question as to whether the group provided, "education on both sides of the issues," and also a question to "please explain what you are [doing] during" 40 Days for Life and Life Chain vigils."

=== Public disclosure of tax information ===
In November 2013, the investigative reporting organization ProPublica requested information from the IRS on 67 nonprofit groups that had spent money on the 2012 elections, including Karl Rove's Crossroads GPS. The IRS's Cincinnati office responded with the documents from 31 of the groups. Of the 31 groups, nine were confidential applications of conservative groups that had not yet been approved and therefore were not supposed to be publicly disclosed. ProPublica made six of these applications public, "after redacting their financial information, deeming that they were newsworthy." ProPublica had made a records request to the office seeking only completed applications, which are public information.

=== Gift tax enforcement ===
In 2011, audit letters were sent to five donors to a now-defunct conservative 501(c)(4) group, Freedom's Watch, which were involved in the 2008 election cycle. The goal of the audit was to assess whether or not gift taxes needed to be paid on these donors' donations to Freedom's Watch. The Congressional Research Service said that the audit was legally well-founded, as tax law exempts only 501(c)(3) and 527 groups from gift taxes. However, Ari Fleischer, a board member of the group, alleged that the group was being singled out. According to tax experts, the IRS had not been enforcing that law, but tax lawyers had advised their clients that they might owe the tax, leading to a situation where some paid and some did not. The audit appeared to indicate a new emphasis on enforcing the law, but political opposition from Republicans in Congress led to the IRS dropping the audit and publicly announcing that it would not levy gift taxes on contributions to 501(c)(4) groups. Inspector General J. Russell George's report recommended that the IRS create clearer rules and conduct more training for employees on 501(c)(4) issues, including gift tax exemptions.

== Public release of information ==
=== Audit report ===
In early May 2013, the Treasury Inspector General for Tax Administration released an audit report confirming that the IRS used inappropriate criteria to identify potential political cases, including organizations with Tea Party in their names.

On May 10, in advance of the public release of the audit findings, Director of the IRS Exempt Organizations division Lois Lerner answered what was later revealed to be a planted question by stating that the IRS was "apologetic" for what she termed "absolutely inappropriate" actions. (Lerner's superior, then-Acting IRS Commissioner Steven Miller, later testified to Congress that he had discussed with Lerner how she was to make the revelation and apology by answering a pre-arranged question at a meeting of the American Bar Association rather than during an appearance two days earlier before the House Ways & Means Committee in Congress.) She asserted that the extra scrutiny had not been centrally planned and had been done by lower-level "front line people" in the Cincinnati office. Media reports soon revealed that IRS officials in two other regional offices had also been involved in scrutinizing conservative groups and that selected applicants said that they had been told their applications were being overseen by a task force in Washington, D.C. The Treasury Inspector General for Tax Administration report showed that Lerner herself had been informed of the affair at a meeting that she had attended on June 29, 2011.

On May 12, Republican and Democratic lawmakers called for a full investigation of the Internal Revenue Service, while White House Press Secretary Jay Carney called the IRS's alleged actions "inappropriate". On May 13, The Washington Post reported that Marcus Owens, head of the IRS department examining tax-exempt groups in 1990–1999, said that the IRS routinely categorized similar groups that sought the status of social welfare organizations. At a May 13 press conference, President Obama called the charges "outrageous" if true, and said that anyone found to be responsible for such actions should be held accountable.

On May 14, the Inspector General's audit report was made public. President Obama released a statement saying, "The IRS must apply the law in a fair and impartial way, and its employees must act with utmost integrity. This report shows that some of its employees failed that test. I've directed Secretary Lew to hold those responsible for these failures accountable, and to make sure that each of the Inspector General's recommendations are implemented quickly, so that such conduct never happens again. But regardless of how this conduct was allowed to take place, the bottom line is, it was wrong." Attorney General Eric Holder announced that he had ordered the Justice Department to begin an investigation into whether the activities amounted to criminal behavior.

=== Findings ===
The Treasury Inspector General for Tax Administration found that inappropriate criteria had been used by IRS personnel to select certain applications for tax exemption status for further review and that inappropriate procedures were applied against organizations based on their names or policy positions. According to the audit, beginning early in 2010, front-line IRS agents violated IRS policy by failing to handle tax matters in an impartial manner that would promote public confidence:

The IRS used inappropriate criteria that identified for review Tea Party and other organizations applying for tax-exempt status based upon their names or policy positions instead of indications of potential political campaign intervention. Ineffective management: 1) allowed inappropriate criteria to be developed and stay in place for more than 18 months, 2) resulted in substantial delays in processing certain applications, and 3) allowed unnecessary information requests to be issued. Although the processing of some applications with potential significant political campaign intervention was started soon after receipt, no work was completed on the majority of these applications for 13 months.... For the 296 total political campaign intervention applications [reviewed in the audit] as of December 17, 2012, 108 had been approved, 28 were withdrawn by the applicant, none had been denied, and 160 were open from 206 to 1,138 calendar days (some for more than three years and crossing two election cycles).... Many organizations received requests for additional information from the IRS that included unnecessary, burdensome questions (e.g., lists of past and future donors).

The Inspector General concluded, "although the IRS has taken some action, it will need to do more so that the public has reasonable assurance that applications are processed without unreasonable delay in a fair and impartial manner in the future."

The Washington Post described the audit report as having found that some IRS employees were "ignorant about tax laws, defiant of their supervisors and blind to the appearance of impropriety".

==== Criticism of the inspector general ====
J. Russell George, the Treasury Department Inspector General who had alerted lawmakers to the IRS's improper behavior, was criticized by Republican lawmakers, who said that because inspectors general are required to notify Congress via agency heads when wrongdoing is discovered—and in serious cases must do so within 7 days—he should have notified Congress in 2012, prior to the election that year. Inspector General George, who was appointed by President George W. Bush, responded by saying that the audit had not been complete, and that in his view, "to ensure fairness and to ensure that we are completely accurate with the information that we convey to Congress, we will not report information until the IRS has had an opportunity to take a look at it to ensure that we're not misstating facts."

On June 24, 2013, new IRS commissioner Danny Werfel revealed that an internal investigation had discovered that the inappropriate screening was both broader and longer-lasting than had previously been known. The report found that words such as "Israel", "progressive" and "Occupy" were also used as red-flags for greater scrutiny, and that screeners were still using such lists up until May 2013. A spokesman for the Inspector General's office in charge of the IRS audit said they had been asked by House Oversight Chairman Darrell Issa (R-CA) "to narrowly focus on Tea Party organizations".

On June 27, 2013, responding to letters from Rep. Sander Levin, the ranking member on the Ways and Means Committee, Inspector General J. Russell George's office released a letter to Levin about the scrutiny of groups with "progressive" in their names. Contradicting earlier claims of George's office, the letter acknowledged that he knew that the word "progressive" had appeared in IRS screening documents. However, he said that the "Progressives" criteria were on a part of the "Be On the Look Out" (BOLO) spreadsheet labeled "Historical", and, unlike other BOLO entries, did not say how to refer flagged cases. While he had many sources confirming the use of "Tea Party" and related criteria described in the report, including employee interviews and e-mails, he found no indication in any of those other materials that "Progressives" was a term used to refer cases for scrutiny for political campaign intervention. The letter further stated that out of the 20 groups applying for tax-exempt status whose names contained "progress" or "progressive", 6 had been chosen for more scrutiny as compared to all of the 292 groups applying for tax-exempt status whose names contained "tea party", "patriot", or "9/12". (Note: See also: Condon, Stephanie (June 27, 2013). "IRS: Progressive groups flagged, but tea party bigger target". CBS News.; Parkinson, John; Phillip, Abby D. (June 27, 2013). "Watchdog Found IRS Softer on 'Progressives' Than Tea Partiers". ABC News.; Stein, Sam (June 27, 2013). "IRS Investigator: Tea Party Groups Were Scrutinized More Than Progressive Organizations". Huffington Post.)

== Second Inspector General's report ==
In late September 2017, an exhaustive report by the Treasury Department's inspector general found that from 2004 to 2013, the IRS used both conservative and liberal keywords to choose targets for further scrutiny, blunting claims that the issue had been an Obama-era partisan scandal. The 115-page report confirmed the findings of the prior 2013 report that some conservative organizations had been unfairly targeted, but also found that the pattern of misconduct had been ongoing since 2004 and was non-partisan in nature.

In reaction, Democratic Senator Ron Wyden of Oregon, the ranking Democrat on the Senate Finance Committee, stated "After years of baseless claims and false accusations it is my hope Republicans will finally put an end to this witch hunt and admit that their attacks on the I.R.S. were nothing but political grandstanding on behalf of special interests at the expense of American taxpayers." In contrast, the Republican chairman of the House Ways and Means Committee, Kevin Brady of Texas, responded by saying that "this report reinforces what government watchdogs and congressional investigators have confirmed time and time again: Bureaucrats at the I.R.S., such as Lois Lerner, arbitrarily and haphazardly administered the tax code and targeted taxpayers based on political ideology." Regardless of reaction, the release of the report brought to an end the last formal governmental investigation into the IRS practice.

== Reaction ==
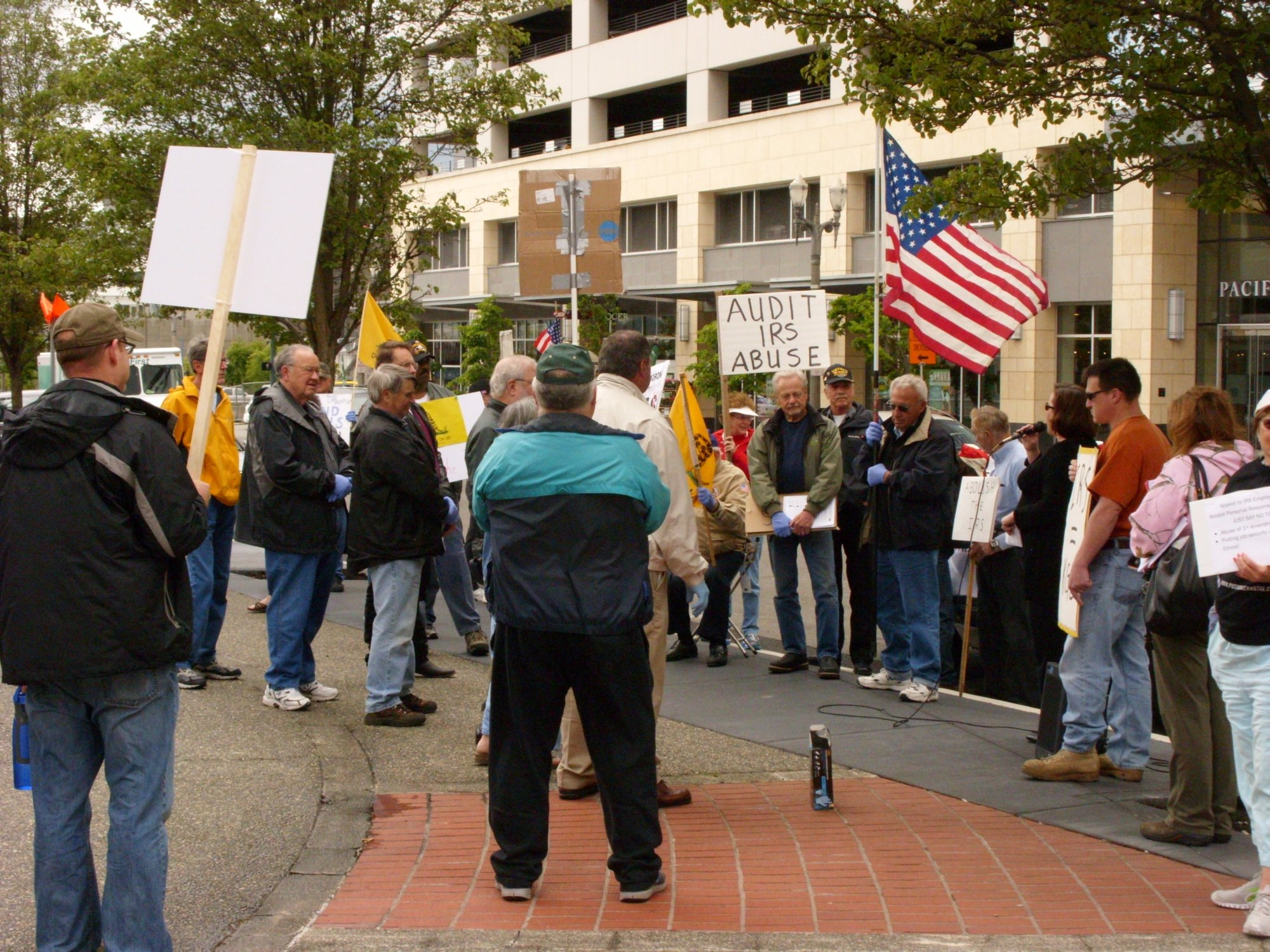
Tea Party members across the U.S. demonstrated at IRS offices on May 21, 2013.

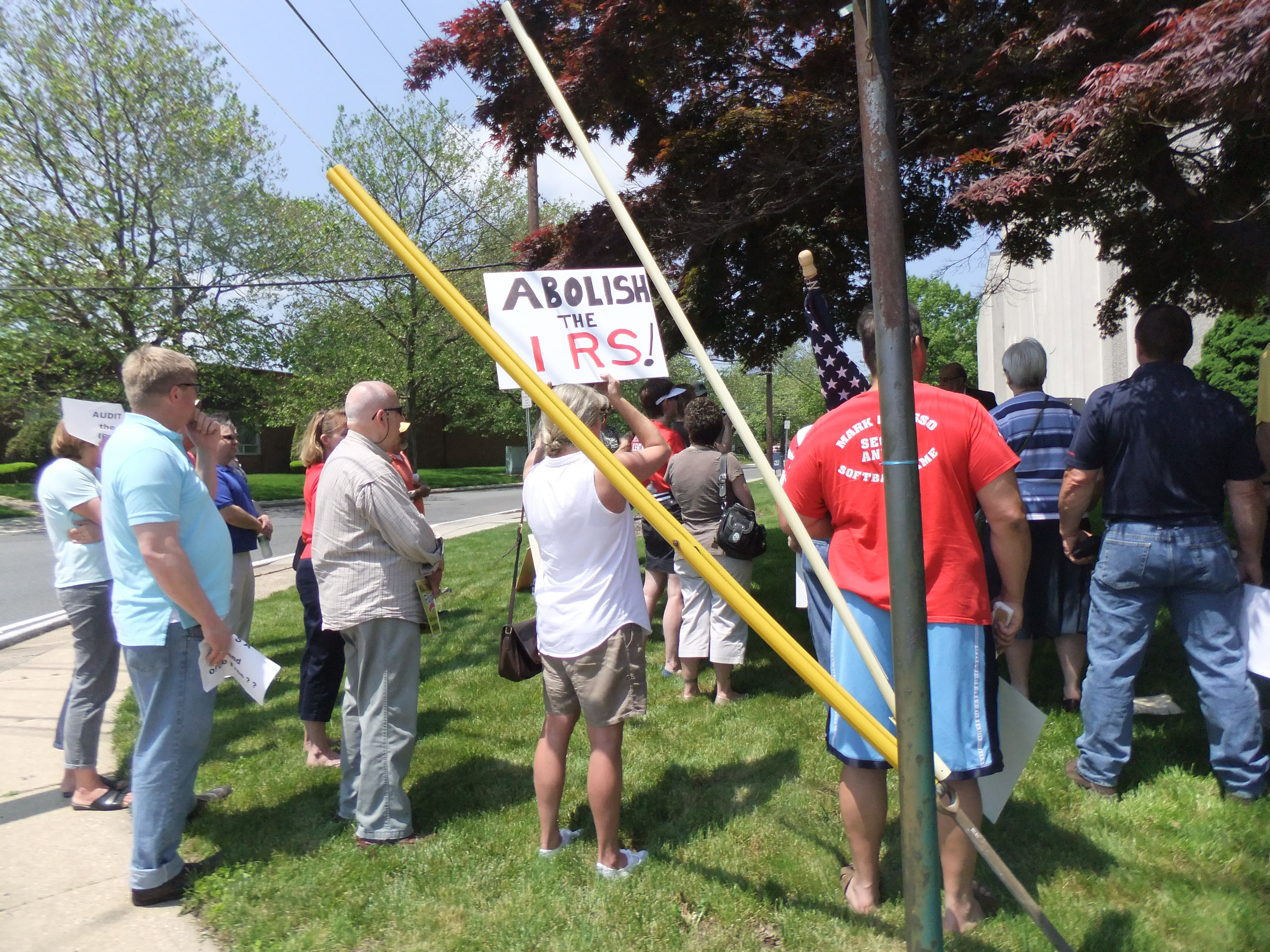
Protesters at IRS facility in Mountainside, New Jersey on May 21, 2013.

=== Initial reaction ===
Montana's then-senator Max Baucus said the allegations were an "outrageous abuse of power," and West Virginia senator Joe Manchin called the IRS's actions "un-American."

From May 13 to 15, several senators and congressional representatives called for Acting Commissioner of the IRS, Steven T. Miller, to resign or be fired. The Speaker of the House of Representatives, John Boehner, said, "My question isn't about who's going to resign, my question is who's going to jail over this scandal?... There are laws in place to prevent this type of abuse. Someone made a conscious decision to harass and to hold up these requests for tax-exempt status. I think we need to know who they are and whether they violated the law. Clearly someone violated the law." Later in the day on May 15, 2013, President Obama announced that his Treasury Secretary had requested and accepted Acting Commissioner Miller's resignation.

Lawmakers also called for the resignation of Lois Lerner, who ran the IRS's section on tax-exempt organizations, as did Danny Werfel, after he was appointed Acting IRS Commissioner following Miller's resignation. When Lerner refused to resign, she was placed on administrative leave. Lerner retired effective September 23, 2013.

Michael Macleod-Ball, chief of staff at the ACLU's Washington Legislative Office, said, "Even the appearance of playing partisan politics with the tax code is about as constitutionally troubling as it gets. With the recent push to grant federal agencies broad new powers to mandate donor disclosure for advocacy groups on both the left and the right, there must be clear checks in place to prevent this from ever happening again."

U.S. Senator Claire McCaskill (D-MO) said, "We should not only fire the head of the IRS, which has occurred, but we've got to go down the line and find every single person who had anything to do with this and make sure that they are removed from the IRS and the word goes out that this is unacceptable." There were rallies by members of the Tea Party in Cherry Hill, New Jersey, as well as across the country protesting selective targeting by the IRS of conservative groups seeking tax-exempt status.

U.S. Senator John Cornyn of Texas released a video titled "A Culture of Intimidation" and a website called "IRS targeting Texans" with multiple stories from conservatives in Texas and elsewhere who had received intrusive questions from the IRS.

Press reaction to the IRS's actions was intense.

- MSNBC's Rachel Maddow said: "There is a reasonable fear by all of us, by any of us, that the kind of power the IRS has could be misused," she further said that this scrutiny of Tea Party groups was "not fair."
- Comedy Central's Jon Stewart stated that the controversy had taken "the last arrow in your pro-governance quiver," he further said that this threw doubt on President Obama's "managerial competence" and had proven correct "conspiracy theorists," moving the burden of proof onto federal authorities.
- ABC News' Terry Moran wrote that this was: "A truly Nixonian abuse of power by the Obama administration."
- NBC's Tom Brokaw stated: "It's time for action."
- NBC's White House correspondent Chuck Todd: "It didn't seem like they had a sense of urgency about it, a real sense of outrage," and further; "This is outrageous no matter what political party you are."
- MSNBC's Joe Scarborough said: "This is tyranny," and talked of "unspeakable" abuses by the IRS. "This time it's real."

A poll released by Quinnipiac University on May 30 revealed that 76% of registered voters—including 63% of Democrats—favored the appointment of a special prosecutor to independently investigate the allegations of wrongdoing. Pollster Peter A. Brown said there was "overwhelming bipartisan support" for such an investigation.

An NBC News/Wall Street Journal poll conducted May 30 to June 2, 2013, found that 55% of respondents believed that the controversy raises questions about the Obama administration's honesty and integrity. This poll found 33% of respondents blamed Obama directly for the actions underlying the controversy. The poll also found the public's confidence in the IRS to be low, with just 10% of respondents expressing confidence in the agency.

=== Subsequent reactions ===
While conservatives and Republican politicians have generally continued to view the IRS's conduct as indicative of politically motivated targeting, many liberal commentators and Democratic politicians quickly came to believe that while the conduct was improper, it was not motivated by politics. Consequently, liberal reactions to the controversy have shifted considerably from the initial condemnation and calls for investigation to descriptions of the controversy as the "Vanishing I.R.S. Scandal," and suggestions that subsequent revelations represent a "nail in the [controversy's] coffin" and the controversy's "fizzl[ing]". On June 9, 2013, less than a month after the initial revelation, House Oversight Committee ranking member Elijah Cummings (D-MD) stated: "Based upon everything I've seen, the case is solved. And if it were me, I would wrap this case up and move on." Following an investigation by the Senate Finance Committee, ranking member Ron Wyden stated: "You are not going to find a partisan political scandal or proof of life on Pluto."

=== Resignations ===
- Steven T. Miller, Acting Commissioner of Internal Revenue and Deputy Commissioner for Services and Enforcement resigned on May 15, 2013
- Joseph H. Grant, commissioner of the Tax Exempt and Government Entities Division, retired on June 3, 2013
- Lois Lerner, the Internal Revenue Service official at the center of the controversy, retired effective September 23, 2013.

=== Lawsuits ===
Catherine Engelbrecht, founder of conservative group True the Vote, filed a lawsuit claiming that her organization's tax-exempt status was unfairly delayed for three years, and alleging that she and her family's small manufacturing business were chosen for retaliatory investigations by the IRS, OSHA, the ATF, and the FBI. In 2013, Chris Van Hollen filed a lawsuit against the IRS to stop the tradition of allowing groups engaged in politics to be registered under 501(c)(4).

In October 2013, the National Organization for Marriage (NOM) filed a federal lawsuit, alleging that the IRS intentionally leaked its 2008 tax return, including donor lists, in violation of federal law. The lawsuit arose from the March 2012 disclosure of NOM's tax return information, including its 2008 IRS Form 990, Schedule B, which contains donor data, to the Human Rights Campaign, an LGBT rights advocacy group, and to the media. (The disclosure revealed that Romney had given $10,000 to NOM, an advocacy group which was created in support of California's Proposition 8 to ban same-sex marriage). Under U.S. federal law, "the IRS is required to provide the public with certain tax information for 501(c)(4) organizations upon request—but personal identifying information of donors must be redacted by the agency."

In a June 2014 ruling, Judge James Cacheris of the U.S. District Court for the Eastern District of Virginia dismissed most of NOM's claims. While the IRS acknowledged that it had improperly made an unredacted copy of NOM's tax information public, NOM provided "no evidence that the information was willfully disclosed or the result of gross negligence." In June 2014, the IRS reached a settlement over NOM's remaining claims of improper disclosure of confidential tax information, in which the IRS agreed to pay $50,000 to NOM.

In October 2017, the Trump Justice Department settled two lawsuits filed by conservative groups that said they were targeted in the controversy. One of these lawsuits was filed on behalf of 428 groups, and the other was filed on behalf of 41 groups. The settlement included payments of $3.5 million to these groups, an apology, and an admission of wrongdoing from the IRS.

Another case settled by the IRS, in 2018, was that of Z Street, a pro-Israel organization. Z Street had complained that its 2009 application for US tax-exempt status, which was granted in 2016, had been unduly scrutinized because of the group's connection to Israel.

== Investigations ==
=== Congressional investigations ===
At least as early as mid-2011, higher-ranking IRS officials knew that conservative groups were being scrutinized.

Selected groups complained to various members of Congress. In response, a congressional committee asked IRS Commissioner Douglas H. Shulman about the allegations in 2012. Shulman told the committee that the agency was not targeting conservative groups. After Shulman denied that the IRS was unfairly targeting conservative groups, the congressional committee ended the 2012 phase of the investigation. Shulman resigned his post in late 2012, before the controversy came to light.

Following the Inspector General's report, the House Committee on Oversight and Government Reform began an investigation into the IRS. Additionally, the House Committee on Ways and Means expanded its ongoing 2011 investigation into possible IRS political targeting to include the BOLO ("be on the lookout") keyword targeting allegations.

On May 15, 2013, the House Oversight Committee requested that Holly Paz, John Shafer, Gary Muther, Liz Hofacre and Joseph Herraz be interviewed beginning May 20, 2013.

On May 22, 2013, in her opening statement to the Oversight Committee, Lois Lerner stated: "I have not broken any laws. I have not violated any IRS rules or regulations. And I have not provided false information to this or any other congressional committee." Lerner then invoked her Fifth Amendment right against self-incrimination and refused to testify.

Oversight Committee Chairman Darrell Issa later asserted that Lerner had waived her Fifth Amendment rights by giving partial testimony and that he intended to call her back into the hearings. Congressman Trey Gowdy agreed with Issa. Gowdy stated: "She [Lois Lerner] just waived her Fifth Amendment right. You don't get to tell your side of the story and then not be subjected to cross examination—that's not the way it works. She waived her right to Fifth Amendment privilege by issuing an opening statement. She ought to stand here and answer our questions." Regent University law professor James Joseph Duane told New York magazine that Gowdy's assertion was "extremely imaginative" but "mistaken" because a person who is involuntarily summoned before a grand jury or a legislative body may selectively invoke the right to silence. Harvard Law School professor Alan Dershowitz took a different view, arguing: "You can't simply make statements about a subject and then plead the Fifth in response to questions about the very same subject," and asserting, "[o]nce you open the door to an area of inquiry, you have waived your Fifth Amendment right."

On May 22, 2013, former IRS Commissioner Doug Shulman testified that he had frequently visited the White House during 2010–2011, but he denied having discussed the targeting of conservatives with anyone in the White House. His testimony was criticized by several columnists. Some media outlets and lawmakers asserted that Shulman had visited the White House up to 157 times; however, The Atlantic reported that that represented the number of times Shulman was cleared by the Secret Service to visit the White House or the Eisenhower Executive Office Building, not necessarily the number of times Shulman actually arrived; visitor sign-in logs can confirm only 11 visits between 2009 and 2012, though the number is likely higher because the sign-in system does not capture every visitor, particularly at large events. Shulman was regularly scheduled for events like the biweekly health-care deputies meeting that would have had a standing list of people cleared to attend.

On June 9, 2013, Rep. Cummings released portions of an interview transcript in which an anonymous IRS manager who described himself as a "conservative Republican" told Congressional investigators that he had initiated the selected reviews without any involvement from the White House and that the extra scrutiny was not politically motivated. In an appearance on CNN's State of the Union, Cummings said, "Based upon everything I've seen, the case is solved. And if it were me, I would wrap this case up and move on." Oversight Committee Chairman Issa responded in a statement, "The testimony excerpts Ranking Member Cummings revealed today did not provide anything enlightening or contradict other witness accounts. The only thing Ranking Member Cummings left clear in his comments today is that if it were up to him the investigation would be closed."

On May 7, 2014, on a near party-line vote (with six Democrats joining all Republicans) the House of Representatives voted to hold Lerner in contempt of Congress for refusing to cooperate with the Congressional investigation. House Republicans dismissed Lerner's invocation of the Fifth Amendment as ineffective, with Issa stating: "You don't get to use a public hearing to tell the public and press your side of the story and then invoke the Fifth." Democrats characterized the contempt proceeding as a "witch hunt" geared toward the 2014 midterm elections.

On June 13, 2014, the IRS notified Republican congressional investigators that it had lost Lerner's emails from January 2009 to April 2011 because of a mid-2011 computer crash. The emails were under subpoena as part of the congressional investigation. On June 19, the IRS said that the damaged hard drive containing Lerner's missing emails had been disposed of more than two years prior. Some commentators have raised legal issues concerning how the IRS handled these federal records. A National Archives and Records Administration spokesperson said in an email communication that: "The Office of the Chief Records Officer for the U.S. Government has contacted the IRS to explore specifics of the situation."

On July 9, 2014, Republicans released an April 13, 2013 email from Lerner in which she cautioned colleagues to "be cautious about what we say in emails," citing congressional inquiries. The email did not specify which congressional inquiries Lerner was concerned about and made no mention of the then-impending TIGTA report. Republicans said that this email suggested that Lerner tried to hide evidence from investigators.

On September 5, 2014, the IRS said it lost additional emails of five workers under congressional investigation, blaming computer crashes. These five workers include two people based in Cincinnati who worked on Tea Party cases; according to the IRS the crashes all predate congressional investigations and had occurred between September 2009 and February 2014.

On September 5, 2014, the Senate Permanent Subcommittee on Investigations released its report on the controversy. The subcommittee's majority report, authored by subcommittee chairman Senator Carl Levin and submitted for the subcommittee's Democrats, concurred with TIGTA's finding that inappropriate screening criteria were used but concluded that there was no intentional wrongdoing or political bias in the use of the criteria. The majority faulted TIGTA for omitting from its report that liberal groups were also selected for additional screening and that previous TIGTA inquiries found no indication of political bias at the IRS. The subcommittee's Republican minority submitted a dissenting report authored by ranking member Senator John McCain which broadly validated the TIGTA report and accused the majority of minimizing bias against conservative groups, noting that most of the groups targeted for additional scrutiny were conservative.

On November 22, 2014, a spokesman for the House Oversight and Government Reform Committee's Republican majority stated that TIGTA investigators told Congress that they had recovered up to 30,000 emails to and from Lois Lerner.

On December 23, 2014, Chairman Issa's staff released a new report that found that "[t]he IRS's inability to keep politics out of objective decisions about interpretation of the tax code damaged its primary function: an apolitical tax collector that Americans can trust to treat them fairly." The report was criticized by Rep. Cummings as "cherry-picked" to support a political narrative. The report did not link the IRS's conduct to coordination with the White House, though Republicans stressed that the investigation is ongoing and will continue in the next Congress.

In January 2015, the United States Senate requested that the White House produce all communications it has had with the IRS since 2010.

=== Senate Finance Committee final report ===
On August 5, 2015, the Senate Finance Committee released Senate Report 114-119, The Internal Revenue Service's Processing of 501(c)(3) and 501(c)(4) Applications for Tax-Exempt Status Submitted by "Political Advocacy" Organizations From 2010-2013. The Report runs 7,913 pages, and includes a 142-page "Bipartisan Investigative Report as Submitted by Chairman Hatch and Ranking Member Wyden." The Committee concluded that management at the IRS had been "delinquent in its responsibility to provide effective control, guidance, and direction over the processing of applications for tax-exempt status filed by Tea Party and other political advocacy organizations" and that poor planning by the agency resulted in "predictable failure" in addressing those delinquencies. The Committee found that "IRS managers forfeited the opportunity to shape the IRS's response to the influx of political advocacy applications by simply failing to read reports informing them of the existence of those applications."

While the report contained many bipartisan findings, Republican and Democratic committee members offered separate reports differing sharply on the ultimate reason for the IRS's failures. The Republican report (entitled "Additional View of Senator Hatch Prepared by Republican Staff") stated that the IRS had targeted Tea Party groups for "politically motivated reasons," while the Democratic report (entitled "Additional View of Senator Wyden Prepared by Democratic Staff") blamed the agency's failures on "gross mismanagement" that treated groups in the same poor manner regardless of ideology.

=== FBI investigation ===
In January 2014, the Federal Bureau of Investigation (FBI) announced that it had found no evidence warranting the filing of federal criminal charges in connection with the affair. The FBI stated it found no evidence of "enemy hunting" of the kind that had been suspected, but that the investigation did reveal the IRS to be a mismanaged bureaucracy enforcing rules that IRS personnel did not fully understand. The officials indicated, however, that the investigation is continuing.

=== DOJ investigation ===
In October 2015, the Justice Department notified Congress that there would be no charges against the former IRS official Lois Lerner or against anyone else in the IRS. The investigation found no evidence of illegal activity or the partisan targeting of political groups and found that no IRS official attempted to obstruct justice. The DOJ investigation did find evidence of mismanagement and Lerner's poor judgement in using her IRS account for personal messages but said "...poor management is not a crime." In September 2017, the DOJ declined a request from the U.S. House Committee on Ways and Means to reopen the investigation into Lerner's IRS activities.

== Impeachment resolution ==
Four days after the Justice Department closed its investigation, 19 members of the House Oversight and Government Reform Committee led by the Committee's Chairman, Jason Chaffetz (R-UT), filed a resolution to impeach IRS Commissioner John Koskinen. Those sponsoring the impeachment resolution to remove Koskinen from office accused him of failing to prevent the destruction of evidence in allowing the erasure of back-up tapes containing thousands of e-mails written by Lois Lerner, and of making false statements under oath to Congress. In a statement released by the Committee, Chaffetz said Koskinen "failed to comply with a congressionally issued subpoena, documents were destroyed on his watch, and the public was consistently misled. Impeachment is the appropriate tool to restore public confidence in the IRS and to protect the institutional interests of Congress."

On October 27, 2015, the IRS stated that the agency did not have an immediate comment on the impeachment resolution. Representative Cummings said in a statement: "This ridiculous resolution will demonstrate nothing but the Republican obsession with diving into investigative rabbit holes that waste tens of millions of taxpayer dollars while having absolutely no positive impact on a single American. Calling this resolution a 'stunt' or a 'joke' would be insulting to stunts and jokes."

== Deleted evidence ==
Responding to a lawsuit filed by Judicial Watch, Thomas Kane, Deputy Assistant Chief Counsel for the IRS, wrote in a sworn declaration that Lerner's Blackberry was "removed or wiped clean of any sensitive or proprietary information and removed as scrap for disposal in June 2012." In a USA Today opinion column, James S. Robbins wrote, "For a scandal that is frequently derided as 'fake,' it is amazing how often real evidence disappears. The disappearing act is so frequent, it is reasonable to wonder whether it is really a systematic attempt to destroy evidence of abuse of power." An IRS IT official told the National Review that any personal folders containing Lerner's emails were unlikely to have been on the Blackberry as, if they had been, then IT employees "wouldn't have been jumping through all the hoops to recover data from [Lerner's crashed hard] drive" in June 2011.

== See also ==
- Nixon's Enemies List - list from Nixon administration accused of being used to target people with IRS audits
- Linchpins of Liberty v. United States - Court case regarding IRS targeting heard in the DC Circuit Court of Appeals
