= Mark Mazur =

American economist

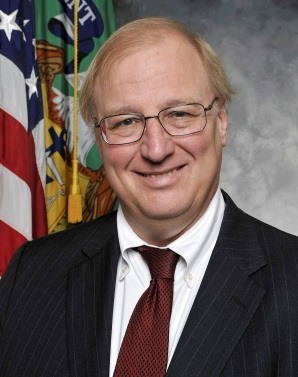

Assistant Secretary of the Treasury for Tax Policy
- In office January 20, 2021 – September 27, 2021; Acting
- President: Joe Biden
- Preceded by: David Kautter
- Succeeded by: Lily Batchelder
- In office August 2012 – January 20, 2017
- President: Barack Obama
- Preceded by: Michael Mundaca
- Succeeded by: David Kautter

Personal details
- Political party: Democratic
- Education: Michigan State University (BA); Stanford University (MA, PhD)

Mark J. Mazur is an American economist who formerly served as Assistant Secretary for Tax Policy in the U.S. Department of the Treasury.

== Early life and education ==
Mark Mazur received a Bachelor of Arts in financial administration from Michigan State University and earned a Ph.D. in economics from Stanford University.

== Career ==
Mazur early worked as a tax accountant for General Motors before spending four years teaching public finance at Carnegie Mellon University. Later, he entered government, working first as a staff member on the U.S. Congress' Joint Committee on Taxation and, later, in several middle management positions at the White House and the U.S. Department of Energy. He eventually moved to the Internal Revenue Service where he was appointed to the senior-level position of director of research, analysis, and statistics of income.

In 2009 Mazur was appointed Deputy Assistant Secretary of the Treasury for Tax Analysis. He was named Assistant Secretary for Tax Policy in 2011, being confirmed to the post by the U.S. Senate the following year.

In 2017, Mazur left the U.S. government to accept a position as director of the Tax Policy Center, a joint project of the Urban Institute and the Brookings Institution.
