= David Kautter =

American lawyer

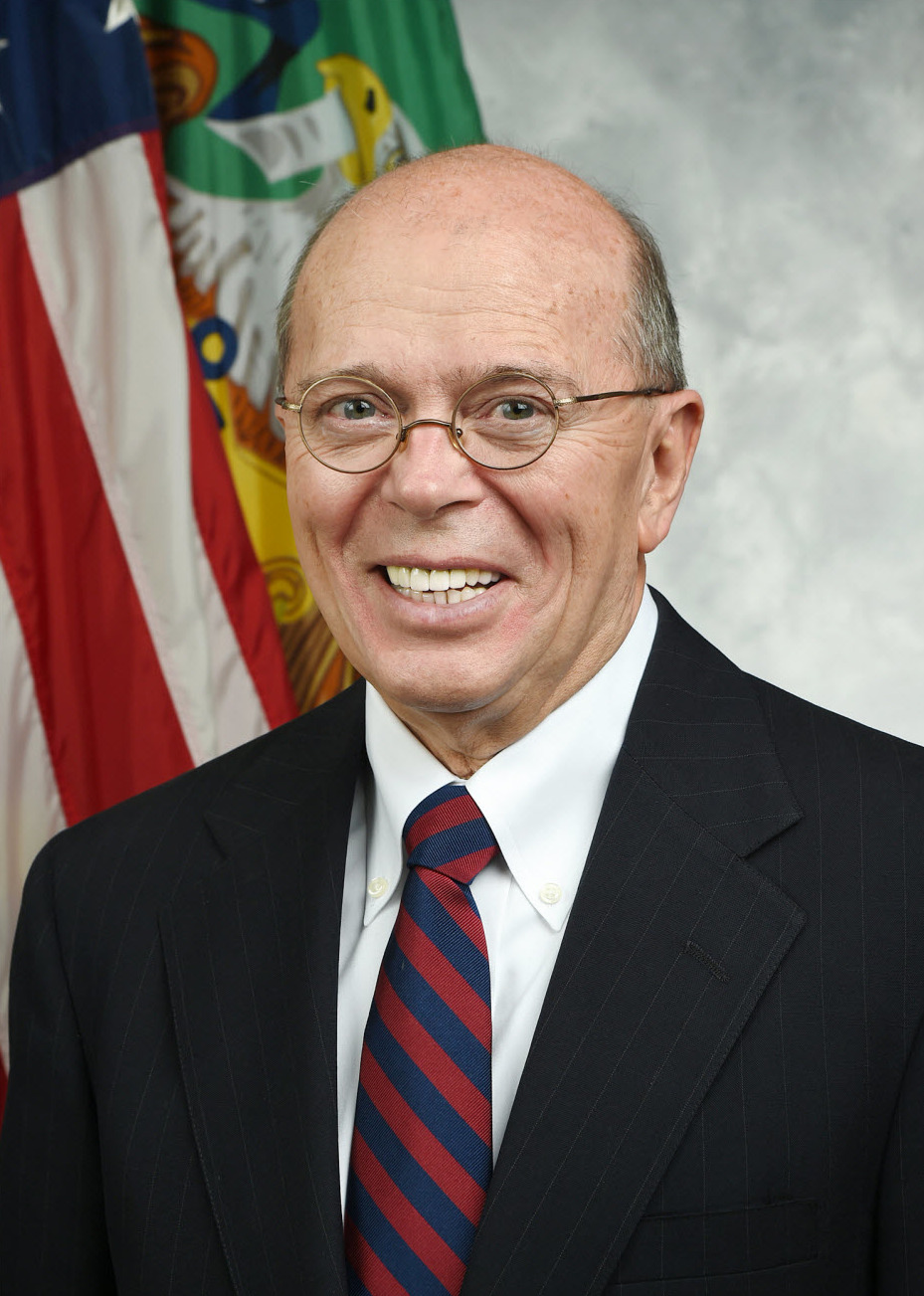

Acting Commissioner of Internal Revenue
- In office November 13, 2017 – September 30, 2018
- President: Donald Trump
- Preceded by: John Koskinen
- Succeeded by: Charles P. Rettig

Assistant Secretary of the Treasury for Tax Policy
- In office September 25, 2017 – January 20, 2021
- President: Donald Trump
- Preceded by: Mark Mazur
- Succeeded by: Lily Batchelder

Personal details
- Education: University of Notre Dame (BA); Georgetown University (JD)

David Kautter is an American lawyer who served as assistant secretary of the United States Treasury for tax policy from 2017 to 2021 under the first Trump presidency.

Prior to assuming his prior role of assistant secretary, he was a partner at accounting firm RSM International. Kautter was previously the managing director of the Kogod Tax Center and executive-in-residence at the Kogod School of Business at American University. He was a partner at Ernst & Young and served as tax legislative counsel for former U.S. Senator John Danforth. According to The Hill, "If confirmed, Kautter would oversee tax matters in the department and would likely play a key role in the administration's tax-reform efforts."

On October 26, 2017, President Donald Trump announced the designation of Kautter to be the acting commissioner of the Internal Revenue Service effective November 13, 2017. His acting assignment ended when IRS Commissioner Charles P. Rettig was confirmed by the full senate on September 12, 2018, and sworn in on October 1, 2018.
