= Tax Policy Center =

American think tank

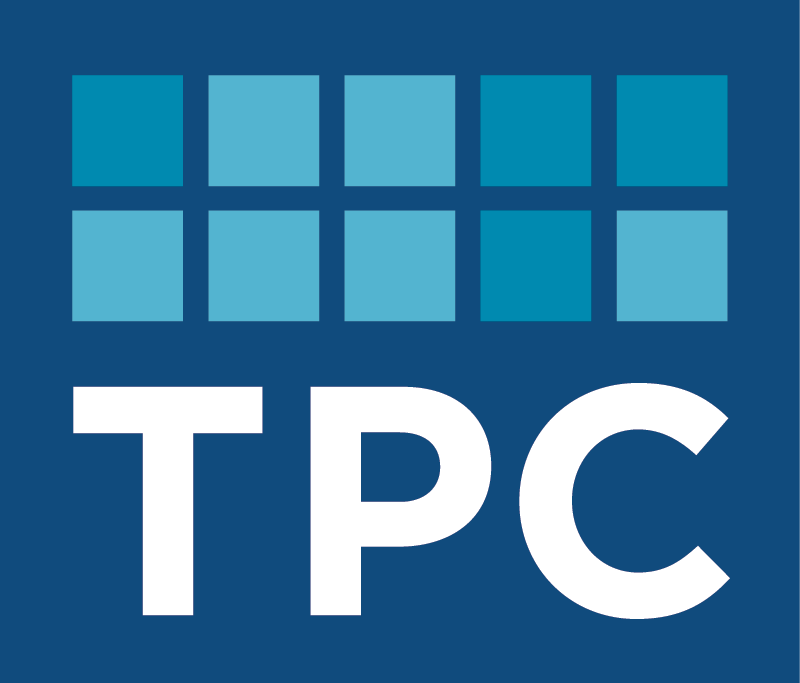
- Abbreviation: TPC
- Formation: January 9, 2002; 23 years ago
- Type: Public policy think tank
- Headquarters: Washington, D.C., U.S.
- Robert C. Pozen Director: Tracy Gordon
- Website: Official website

The Urban-Brookings Tax Policy Center, typically shortened to the Tax Policy Center (TPC), is a nonpartisan think tank based in Washington D.C., United States. A joint venture of the Urban Institute and the Brookings Institution, it aims to provide independent analyses of current and longer-term tax issues, and to communicate its analyses to the public and to policymakers. TPC combines national specialists in tax, expenditure, budget policy, and microsimulation modeling to concentrate on five overarching areas of tax policy: fair, simple and efficient taxation, social policy in the tax code, business tax reform, long-term implications of tax and budget choices, and state tax issues.

== Staff ==
Tracy Gordon became the Robert C. Pozen Director of the Tax Policy Center in March 2022, after serving as Acting Director from January 2021. She succeeded Mark Mazur, who was director from 2017 to 2021. Len Burman preceded him from 2013 to 2017 and Donald Marron was director from 2010 to 2013. Rosanne Altshuler served as director from 2009 to 2010. Gene Steuerle was the founding director from 2002 to 2008.

Economist Elena Patel of the Brookings Institution is the co-director of the Center alongside Gordon. She succeeded William G. Gale in 2025, who had served as Co-Director since its founding.

== Analyses ==
TPC publications examine the impacts of a variety of tax issues. A 2012 report outlined the then-presidential candidates' tax proposals and analyzed their distributional and revenue impacts. Other studies have examined the 2001-2006 tax cuts, the alternative minimum tax, the impact of tax provisions on low-income families, and tax incentives for education. An extensive collection of tables provides estimates of the impact of current taxes as well as the implications of proposals to change tax law.

TPC representatives have testified before the United States Congress regarding tax and health care reforms. TaxVox, the TPC blog, discusses current tax and budget issues. The Tax Policy Briefing Book is an on-line collection of short articles that explain a range of tax issues. Entries offer background information, describe key elements of the tax system, propose changes to improve the tax system, and provide information on state and local tax policy. The center has also collected various data tables in "Tax Facts" which cover aspects of the U.S. tax system, ranging from tax rates and revenues collected to changes over time in state and local tax collections. TPC's State and Local Finance Data Query System (SLF-DQS) provides tools with which users can create their own tables related to state and local finances based on data from the Census of Governments State and Local Finance series.

== Funding ==
TPC is funded by individuals, corporations, trade groups, and foundations including the Ford Foundation, the Bill and Melinda Gates Foundation, and the Rockefeller Foundation.

== See also ==
- Center on Budget and Policy Priorities
- Citizens for Tax Justice
- Council on State Taxation
- Institute on Taxation and Economic Policy
- Tax Foundation
