= Leonard Burman =

American economist (born 1953)

Len Burman

Deputy Assistant Secretary of the Treasury for Tax Analysis
- In office 1998–2000
- President: Bill Clinton

Personal details
- Born: 1953 (age 72–73) Philadelphia, Pennsylvania, U.S.
- Spouse: Melissa Burman
- Education: Wesleyan University (BA); University of Minnesota (MA, PhD)

Leonard "Len" E. Burman (born 1953) is an American economist, tax policy expert, and author. He is currently an institute fellow at the Urban Institute, the Paul Volcker Chair in Behavioral Economics at the Maxwell School of Citizenship and Public Affairs at Syracuse University, and a senior research associate at Syracuse University's Center for Policy Research. He is, with Joel Slemrod, the author of Taxes in America: What Everyone Needs to Know. Burman is also a fellow of National Academy of Public Administration.

== Education and early career ==
Born in Philadelphia, Burman graduated Northeast High School in 1971. He received an A.B. in economics from Wesleyan University in 1975 and received a Ph.D. in economics at the University of Minnesota in 1985.

== Career ==
=== Early career ===
Prior to graduate school, Burman was an economist with Data Resources, Inc. from 1975 to 1978. He served as an economics instructor at Bates College from 1983 to 1985.

=== Treasury and Congressional Budget Office ===
Burman began his career in Washington as a financial economist with the Office of Tax Policy at the United States Department of the Treasury. During his time at Treasury, Burman worked on the design and implementation of the Tax Reform Act of 1986. After leaving Treasury in 1988, Burman served for over a decade as a senior economic analyst at the Congressional Budget Office, writing reports on tax policy issues including the low-income housing credit, health reform, tax incentives for health and retirement, and the capital gains tax.

=== Clinton Administration ===
The Clinton administration brought Burman back to Treasury in 1998 to become the Deputy Assistant Secretary of the Treasury for Tax Analysis, serving as the administration's top tax economist. Burman served in this post for two years.

In 2000, Burman left the Clinton administration to become a senior fellow at the Urban Institute.

In 2002, Burman, along with other tax experts from the Reagan, Clinton, and Bush administrations, founded the Tax Policy Center as a joint venture of the Brookings Institution and the Urban Institute. Burman served as the inaugural director of the Tax Policy Center until 2009 and provided guidance on tax policy issues and proposals as a resident expert. The current director of the Tax Policy Center is Donald Marron.

=== Later career ===
Since leaving the Clinton administration in 2000, Burman has served in several posts in academia. Between 2000 and 2008, Burman was a visiting professor and lecturer at the Georgetown Public Policy Institute and a visiting professor at the UCLA School of Law.

Burman currently serves as the Paul Volcker Chair in Behavioral Economics at the Maxwell School of Citizenship and Public Affairs at Syracuse University. He teaches classes on tax and social policy. In addition, Burman is a senior research associate at Syracuse University's Center for Policy Research, a research associate at the National Bureau of Economic Research, and an affiliated scholar at the Urban Institute. He is the immediate past-president of the National Tax Association, has served on the Bipartisan Policy Center’s Debt Reduction Task Force, and currently serves on the board of the Pew SubsidyScope Project.

Burman blogs as The Impertinent Economist on Forbes.com and on the Tax Policy Center’s blog, TaxVox and has written over 120 articles on a wide range of tax and fiscal policy issues over a thirty-year span. His op-eds have appeared in The Washington Post, The New York Times, and other publications. In addition, Burman has written or coedited three books including The Labyrinth of Capital Gains Tax Policy: A Guide for the Perplexed and Taxes in America: What Everyone Needs to Know.

== Personal life ==
Burman is married to Melissa Burman, a former administrator at Georgetown University, and has four children, (Rob, Paul, Kent and Liz) and two grandchildren. He is an avid cyclist who biked across the country in 2004 with his son, Paul, to raise over $100,000 for Partners In Health. He sings in the a cappella group, Polyhymnia, and is a former member of the Syracuse Oratorio Society, New Dominion Chorale, Arlington Metropolitan Chorus, and Androscoggin Chorale. He currently resides in Arlington County, Virginia.
