= John Koskinen =

American government official

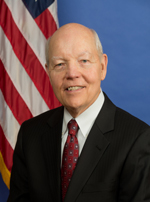

48th Commissioner of Internal Revenue
- In office December 23, 2013 – November 12, 2017
- President: Barack Obama; Donald Trump
- Preceded by: Douglas Shulman
- Succeeded by: Charles Rettig

Deputy Director of the Office of Management and Budget
- In office October 1994 – August 1995
- President: Bill Clinton
- Preceded by: Alice Rivlin
- Succeeded by: Jack Lew

Personal details
- Born: John Andrew Koskinen; June 30, 1939 (age 86) Cleveland, Ohio, U.S.
- Party: Democratic
- Spouse: Patricia Salz
- Children: 2
- Education: Duke University (BA); Yale University (LLB); Queens' College, Cambridge

John Andrew Koskinen (born June 30, 1939) is an American businessman and public official. He served as the non-executive chairman of Freddie Mac from September 2008 to December 2011, retiring from the board in February 2012. On December 20, 2013, Koskinen was confirmed by the U.S. Senate to head the Internal Revenue Service (IRS) as Commissioner of Internal Revenue. On December 23, 2013, Koskinen was sworn in as the 48th IRS Commissioner after being nominated by President Barack Obama. His term ended on November 12, 2017, with David Kautter becoming his interim replacement, followed by Charles P. Rettig as his permanent replacement.

== Early life ==
Koskinen was born on June 30, 1939, in Cleveland, Ohio. He has Finnish-American roots, because his grandparents came from Finland to the United States at the beginning of the 1900s. In 1957, Koskinen graduated high school at Ashland High School (now known as Paul G. Blazer High School) in Ashland, Kentucky. He graduated magna cum laude with a BA in physics from Duke University in 1961, where he was a member of the Sigma Chi fraternity and Phi Beta Kappa. He graduated with a Bachelor of Laws, cum laude from Yale Law School in 1964, and did postgraduate work at Queens' College, Cambridge in England from 1964 to 1965.

== Career ==
Koskinen served as president of the U.S. Soccer Foundation from 2004 to 2008. He previously served as the deputy mayor of the District of Columbia, the deputy director for management of the Office of Management and Budget, and then later President Clinton's chairman of the President's Council on Y2K, 2000 Conversion, the Year 2000 problem.

He served on the board of AES from 2004 to 2013 and American Capital, Ltd from 2007 to 2013. On March 11, 2009, he was announced as the interim CEO at Freddie Mac. On April 23, 2009, he became the principal financial officer after the death of Freddie Mac's acting CFO, David Kellermann. In August 2009, with the hiring of a new CEO, he returned to his position as non-executive chairman of the board of Freddie Mac.

Prior to entering government service, Koskinen worked for 21 years for The Palmieri Company as vice president, president, CEO, and chairman, working on the turnaround of large, failed enterprises such as the Penn Central Transportation Company, Levitt and Sons, the Teamsters Pension Fund, Mutual Benefit, and Equity Programs Investment Corporation.

Earlier in his career, Koskinen clerked for Judge David L. Bazelon, chief judge of the U.S. Court of Appeals for the District of Columbia, from 1965 to 1966, practiced law with the firm of Gibson, Dunn and Crutcher from 1966 to 1967, and served as the special assistant to the deputy executive director of the National Advisory Commission on Civil Disorders (the "Kerner Commission") from 1967 to 1968. While at the Kerner Commission, he worked to secure funding and resources for the Commission and helped write and edit the Commission's final report.

Thereafter, he was legislative assistant to Mayor John Lindsay of New York City from 1968 to 1969 and assistant to Senator Abraham Ribicoff (D-Conn.) from 1969 to 1973.

Koskinen chaired the Washington, D.C., host committee for the 1994 World Cup and the Duke University board of trustees. He is a fellow of the National Academy of Public Administration.

=== Appointment as IRS Commissioner ===
On August 1, 2013, the White House announced President Obama would nominate Koskinen as commissioner of the Internal Revenue Service.

On December 20, 2013, Senate Democrats voted 56–39 for cloture on the nomination, cutting off a Republican-led filibuster. Senators then confirmed Koskinen in a 59–36 vote, along party lines. On December 23, 2013, he was sworn in as the 48th IRS Commissioner.

During the first seven months of 2014, Koskinen testified at ten Congressional hearings primarily focused on the questions surrounding the report in May, 2013 by the Treasury Inspector General for Tax Administration that the IRS used improper criteria for selecting, for further inquiry and delay, organizations applying for status as social welfare organizations under section 501(c)(4) of the Internal Revenue Code. The hearings also focused on the length of time it was taking the IRS to respond to requests for documents and the circumstances surrounding the hard drive crash in 2011 of the computer of Lois Lerner, a major figure in the overall investigation.

On November 24, 2015, Koskinen signed a memorandum that commits the IRS to fostering a model workplace free of conduct that negatively impacts employee engagement and productivity.

=== Impeachment proceedings ===
After the Justice Department notified Congress in October 2015 that there would be no charges against Lois Lerner or anyone else in the IRS, 19 Republican members of the House Oversight and Government Reform Committee led by the committee's chairman, Jason Chaffetz (R-UT), filed a resolution to impeach Koskinen.

Those sponsoring the impeachment resolution to remove Koskinen from office accused him of failing to prevent the destruction of evidence in allowing the erasure of backup tapes containing thousands of e-mails written by Lerner, and of making false statements under oath to Congress. In a statement released by the committee, Chaffetz said Koskinen "failed to comply with a congressionally issued subpoena, documents were destroyed on his watch, and the public was consistently misled. Impeachment is the appropriate tool to restore public confidence in the IRS and to protect the institutional interests of Congress."

The IRS declared on October 27 that it did not have an immediate comment on the impeachment resolution. Representative Elijah Cummings (D-Maryland), the committee's top Democrat, said in a statement: "This ridiculous resolution will demonstrate nothing but the Republican obsession with diving into investigative rabbit holes that waste tens of millions of taxpayer dollars while having absolutely no positive impact on a single American. Calling this resolution a 'stunt' or a 'joke' would be insulting to stunts and jokes."

The resolution was referred to the House Judiciary committee, which held hearings on the matter on May 23 and June 22, 2016.

The House leadership decided not to proceed further which led to threats to offer a privileged resolution for impeachment. On December 6, 2016, such a privileged resolution was offered, but the House voted to send the question back to the Judiciary Committee.

== Personal life ==
As of June 25, 2014, Koskinen had contributed almost USD $100,000 to Democratic candidates and groups.

== Legacy ==
Koskinen Stadium at Duke University, which hosts the Duke soccer and lacrosse teams, was named and dedicated in 1999 in honor of the support of John and Patricia Koskinen, who have various foundations.

Government offices
Preceded by Daniel Werfel; Acting	Commissioner of Internal Revenue; 2013–2017	Succeeded by David Kautter; Acting
