= Don't Weaponize the IRS Act =

Campaign finance bill in the 117th Congress

- Long title: To amend the Internal Revenue Code of 1986 to codify the Trump administration rule on reporting requirements of exempt organizations, and for other purposes.
- Enacted by: the 117th United States Congress
- Sponsored by: Senate: Mike Braun (R-In)
- Number of co-sponsors: Senate: 48

Codification
- Acts affected: Internal Revenue Code of 1986

Legislative history
- Introduced in the Senate on May 20, 2021; Committee consideration by United States Senate Committee on Finance

The Don't Weaponize the IRS Act (H.R. 4889, S. 1777) is a proposed bill in the United States Congress which would reduce the amount of information that nonprofit organizations are required to report to the US Internal Revenue Service.

The bill would be a codification of a Trump-era rule where organizations would not be required to report the names and addresses of their major donors to the IRS.

== Background ==
The bill was drawn up partially as a response to proposed changes included in the For the People Act, and partially in response to the 2013 IRS targeting controversy.

== Support and opposition ==
Proponents of the bill claim the bill will improve privacy of taxpayers, avoiding partisan harassment and retaliation, and say that the data collection is unnecessary for tax collection purposes. In Congress, the legislation is supported by exclusively by members of the Republican Party, with 48 cosponsors in the Senate.

Members of the Democratic Party have been sharply critical of the policy behind the bill. In April 2021, 40 Senate Democrats signed a letter calling for the Trump-era rule to be overturned, pointing to the rule's potential to hamper investigations into foreign election spending, dark money, and illegal activity. In May 2021, 30 House Democrats sent another letter directly critical of the bill, citing similar concerns about the disclosures being necessary for transparency in the wake of Citizens United v. FEC decision.
