= Michael Mundaca =

American tax lawyer

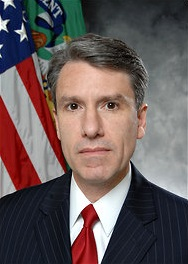

Assistant Secretary of the Treasury for Tax Policy
- In office March 2010 – May 2011
- President: Barack Obama
- Preceded by: Eric Solomon
- Succeeded by: Mark Mazur

Personal details
- Born: New York City, New York, U.S.
- Education: Columbia University (BA); University of Chicago (MA); University of California, Berkeley (JD); University of Miami (LLM)

Michael F. Mundaca is an American tax lawyer who served as Assistant Secretary for Tax Policy in the U.S. Department of the Treasury.

== Early life and education ==
Mundaca was born in Staten Island, New York City, where his father, a Chilean immigrant, worked for the United States Postal Service.

He received his B.A. in philosophy and physics from Columbia University in 1986, and a M.A. from the University of Chicago. He received a J.D. from the UC Berkeley School of Law in 1992, where he was the senior executive editor of the California Law Review and a member of the Order of the Coif. He also received a LL.M. from the University of Miami School of Law.

== Career ==
Mundaca began his career as an associate at Sullivan & Cromwell's office in New York City. From 1997 to 2002, he worked in the United States Department of the Treasury's Office of Tax Policy, leaving as Deputy International Tax Counsel. He later joined the accounting firm, Ernst & Young, as a partner in the practice's International Tax Services group from 2002 to 2007. In 2007, he rejoined the Treasury Department as Deputy Assistant Secretary for International Tax Affairs. In September 2009, President Barack Obama picked Mundaca as Assistant Treasury Secretary for Tax Policy after Elizabeth Garrett withdrew her nomination. He was confirmed in March 2010 and served in the position until May 2011, when he left the agency to rejoin Ernst & Young, where he has been the leader of the firm's U.S. National Tax Department.
