= Lily Batchelder =

American academic & economist

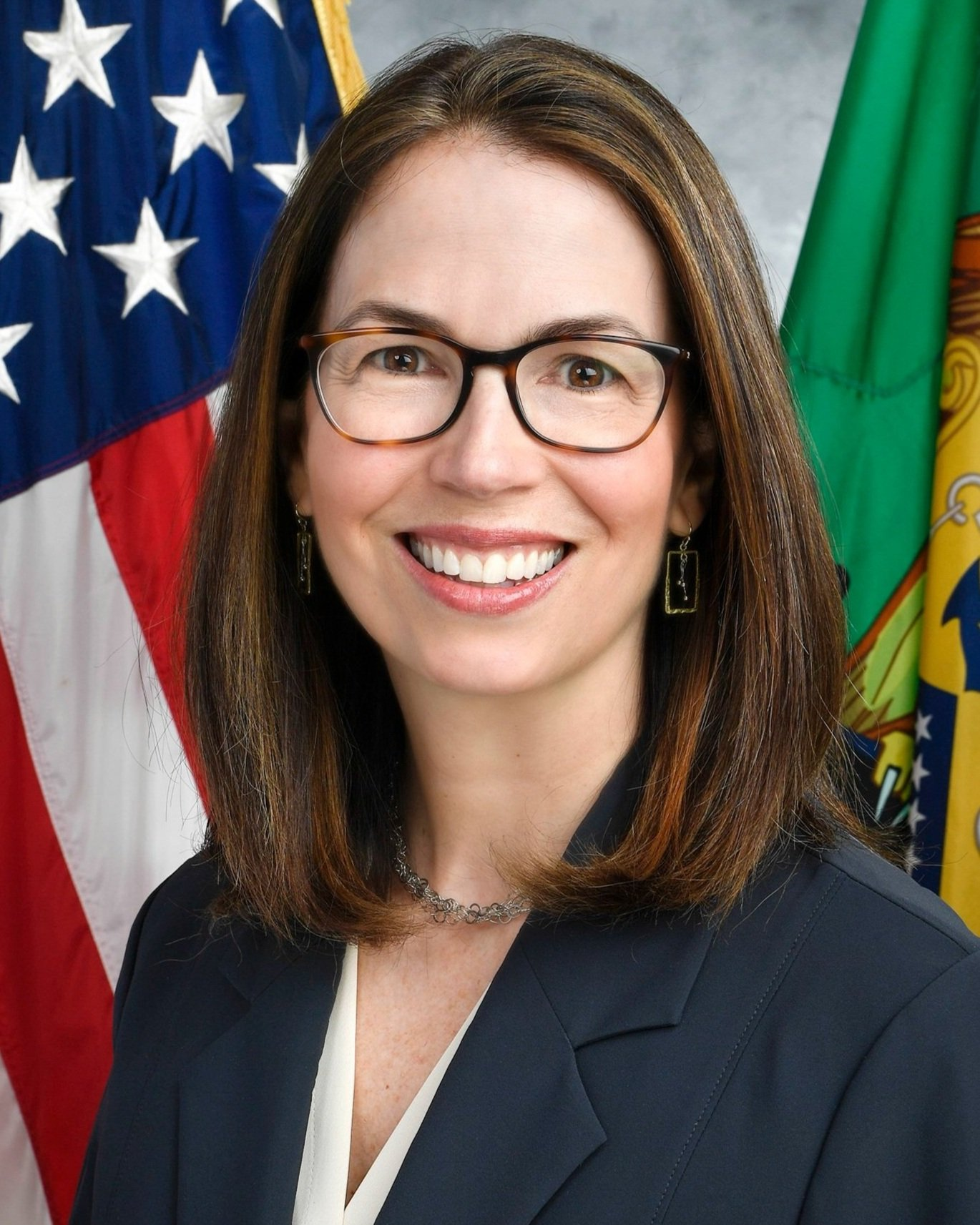

Assistant Secretary of the Treasury for Tax Policy
- In office September 27, 2021 – February 2024
- President: Joe Biden
- Preceded by: David Kautter
- Succeeded by: Ken Kies

Personal details
- Born: Brookline, Massachusetts, U.S.
- Political party: Democratic
- Education: Stanford University (BA); Harvard University (MPP); Yale University (JD)

Lily Lawrence Batchelder is the Robert C. Kopple Family Professor of Taxation at New York University. She previously served as Assistant Secretary of the Treasury for tax policy from September 2021 to February 2024. She was the former chief tax counsel to the U.S. Senate Finance Committee under the Obama administration and appointed to head Joe Biden’s IRS transition team.

== Early life and education ==
Batchelder was born and raised in Brookline, Massachusetts to lawyer Sandy and folk art painter Molly Batchelder. While pursuing her undergraduate degree at Stanford University, Batchelder joined a number of activist groups, including a pro-choice alliance, a solidarity network for Central America, and an anti-apartheid group. After graduating from Stanford, Batchelder worked as a client advocate for a social services organization in Ocean Hill-Brownsville, Brooklyn and became secretary of their board of directors. She eventually returned to school and received her Master of Public Policy in Microeconomics and Human Services at Harvard University and her JD from Yale Law School in 2002.

== Career ==
Upon completing her JD, Batchelder accepted a position in Skadden, Arps, Slate, Meagher & Flom's tax group. She left private practice in September 2004 to join the faculty at New York University School of Law (NYU) in 2005. After joining the faculty as an assistant professor, Batchelder was promoted to associate professor within two years and became a Full professor the next year.

In 2010, Batchelder served as a professor of law and public policy at New York University School of Law, as affiliated faculty at New York University Wagner School of Public Service, and as an affiliated scholar with the Urban-Brookings Tax Policy Center. While serving in these roles, she was appointed by Max Baucus as chief tax counsel for the Senate Finance Committee. In 2014, Batchelder went on leave at NYU to join the White House under the Obama administration as deputy assistant to the president and deputy director at the National Economic Council (NEC). She returned to New York University School of Law as a professor of law and public policy in 2015 after five years, teaching Income Tax for 1Ls, a seminar on Tax and Social Policy, and the Furman Public Policy Fellows Seminar.

Batchelder began reviewing the proposed tax plan of the Trump administration and investigated his claim that his plan would benefit the middle class. Her research found that the proposed benefits would in fact raise taxes on more than half of single parents, while modestly cutting taxes for other middle-class Americans. In recognition of her research, Batchelder was recognized by Tax Notes and Forbes on their annual lists of "tax people to watch" for her scholarship on tax and her social media presence.

In September 2019, Batchelder accepted her appointment to the Robert C. Kopple Family Professor of Taxation. During the presidential transition of Joe Biden, Batchelder was also appointed to head Joe Biden’s IRS transition team. The following month, she was also appointed to a five-year Affiliated and Associated term as the Willner Family Professor of Psychology and Public Policy at the Robert F. Wagner Graduate School of Public Service.

=== Biden administration ===
On March 11, 2021 President Joe Biden nominated Batchelder to be Assistant Secretary for Tax Policy under Secretary Janet Yellen. Hearings were held before the Senate Finance Committee on May 25, 2021. The committee favorably reported the nomination to the Senate floor on June 10, 2021. Batchelder was confirmed by the full Senate on September 22, 2021, by a vote of 64-34. She assumed office on September 27, 2021.

Batchelder resigned to return to teaching at NYU in February 2024.
