= Tax Foundation =

American think tank

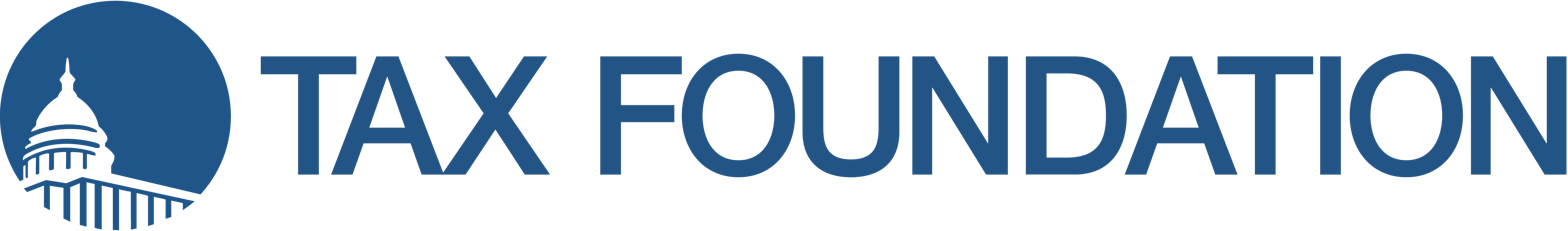
- Formation: December 5, 1937; 88 years ago New York City, New York, U.S.
- Type: Think tank
- Headquarters: 1325 G Street NW, Suite 950, Washington, D.C., U.S.
- Location: Washington, D.C., U.S.
- President: Daniel Bunn
- Revenue: $7.75 million (2025)
- Expenses: $9.09 million (2025)
- Staff: 58 (2025)
- Volunteers: 13 (2025)
- Website: taxfoundation.org

The Tax Foundation is an international research think tank based in Washington, D.C. that collects data and publishes research studies on U.S. tax policies at both the federal and state levels. Its stated mission is to "improve lives through tax policy research and education that leads to greater economic growth and opportunity". It describes itself as an "independent tax policy research organization" and is cited in the media as a nonpartisan or bipartisan organization. It is often described as business-friendly, conservative, and center-right.

The foundation is organized as a 501(c)(3) tax-exempt non-profit educational and research organization, with three primary areas of research: the Center for Federal Tax Policy, the Center for State Tax Policy, and the Center for Global Tax Policy. The group is known for its annual reports such as the State Tax Competitiveness Index, International Tax Competitiveness Index, and Facts & Figures: How Does Your State Compare, which was first produced in 1941.

== History ==
The Tax Foundation was organized on December 5, 1937, in New York City by Alfred P. Sloan Jr., Chairman of the General Motors Corporation; Donaldson Brown, GM Financial Vice President; William S. Farish, President of Standard Oil Company of New Jersey (Exxon); and Lewis H. Brown, President of Johns-Manville Corporation, who later became the first chairman of the board of The Tax Foundation. The organization's stated goal was "to monitor the tax and spending policies of government agencies". Its offices were located at 50 Rockefeller Plaza and later 30 Rockefeller Plaza.

The Tax Foundation's first project was a successful effort to stop a tax increase in Westchester County, New York, where they provided research and analysis (including an "Expenditure Survey" of state spending) to local activists. By 1943, the Tax Foundation had helped set up taxpayers associations and expenditure councils in 35 states.

During World War II, Tax Foundation research emphasized restraining government spending domestically to finance wartime expenditures. In 1948, the Tax Foundation opened an office in Washington, D.C., and in 1978 relocated there completely. Its research and analysis has historically emphasized publicizing federal and state financial information, arguing against the use of tax systems for "social engineering," and urging "broad bases and low rates" tax reform.

Beginning in 1990, the Tax Foundation "operate[d] as a separate unit" of Citizens for a Sound Economy. By July 1991, it was again operating as an independent 501(c)(3) organization.

Beginning in 2009, the Tax Foundation's offices were located in the National Press Building in Washington, D.C. In 2015, the organization moved to its current location on G Street.

== Goals and principles ==
The organization states that it is "guided by the principles of sound tax policy—simplicity, transparency, neutrality, and stability."

Tax Foundation research is generally critical of tax increases, high business taxes, excise taxes, tax preferences for the housing industry, and use of tax credits, which the Foundation views as "picking winners and losers". The Foundation has spoken favorably of efforts to balance the federal budget with tax reform and significant spending cuts, such as the Bowles-Simpson plan, the Ryan Plan, and the Wyden-Coats plan.

== Organizational overview ==
=== Board of directors ===
As of 2025, the organization's board of directors consists of David P. Lewis (chairman), James W. Lintott (treasurer), Bill Archer, Philip English, Dennis Groth, Douglas Holtz-Eakin, Stephen Kranz, Tadd Fowler, Kurt Lamp, Phil Bullock, Loren Ponds, Pamela F. Olson, Kevin Brady, and Tom Roesser.

=== Board of advisors ===
As of 2025, the organization's board of advisors consists of Ann Fitzgerald, Jeff Hoopes, Teri Wielenga, Bob Carroll, John Herr, Claire Kittle Dixon, and Nikki Dobay.

=== Finances ===
The Tax Foundation accepts grants from foundations, corporations, and individuals. It does not solicit or accept funds from government sources. The Tax Foundation has earned a 3 out of 4 star financial rating and 4 out of 4 star accountability and transparency rating from Charity Navigator.

Year	Revenues	Expenses
2023	$7,838,946	$6,957,249
2022	$6,768,789	$5,840,958
2021	$6,514,082	$5,702,477
2020	$5,633,682	$4,747,961
2019	$5,363,389	$5,810,689
2018	$5,314,821	$5,100,639
2017	$5,115,594	$4,548,092
2016	$4,274,002	$4,178,093
2015	$3,557,681	$3,722,271
2014	$3,675,132	$2,971,778
2013	$2,953,060	$2,469,668
2012	$2,192,620	$1,900,821
2011	$1,885,201	$1,768,828
2010	$1,854,135	$1,925,936

== Activities ==
The Tax Foundation publishes several major studies, including Options for Reforming America's Tax Code, which details the economic and revenue impact of over 80 potential changes to the U.S. tax code.

The group uses its Taxes and Growth (TAG) macroeconomic model to simulate the effects of tax policies and produce conventional and dynamic estimates of potential changes in revenue, GDP, wages, employment, and the distribution of the federal tax burden. The TAG model is a "neoclassical, comparative-statics economic model coupled with a tax return simulator". The economic model estimates supply of labor and cost of capital based on marginal tax rates calculated by the tax return simulator.

Since 2014, the TAG model has been used to analyze legislative and campaign tax proposals, including the Tax Reform Act of 2014 proposed by Dave Camp, plans put forth during the 2016 presidential campaigns, the House GOP's 2016 tax reform blueprint, and the Tax Cuts and Jobs Act.

Since 2013, the Tax Foundation has offered guidance to same-sex married couples filing income taxes at the state level, where local laws recognizing same-sex marriage can vary considerably.

Every year, the Tax Foundation calculates and announces Tax Freedom Days in the United States. These studies have been criticized by the Center on Budget and Policy Priorities (CBPP), a progressive think tank, and in turn the Tax Foundation has responded to or criticized CBPP reports. However, the two groups have worked together on analysis of the marriage penalty in the US federal income tax.

The Tax Foundation praised the Tax Cuts and Jobs Act of 2017 as a "pro-growth" tax plan, citing GDP and job growth. The Foundation has been a vocal critic of the Trump administration's trade policies, particularly tariffs.

In 2025, the Tax Foundation stated that the One Big Beautiful Bill Act "provides certainty for US households by permanently extending the Tax Cuts and Jobs Act individual rates and brackets and makes permanent one of the most pro-growth tax policies available: expensing for investment in short-lived assets and domestic research and development. However, it focuses too heavily on political carveouts like the “no tax on tips and overtime” exemptions and misses a critical opportunity to address the deficit and simplify the code."

== Reception ==
In a column for The New York Times blog The Upshot, Josh Barro, a former Tax Foundation employee, criticized the group's approach to scoring the Rubio–Lee tax plan as producing "implausibly rosy results". The Tax Foundation published a response to these criticisms, stating that their model results were "in line with analysis done by other mainstream economists for similar tax changes".

In opinion editorials for the New York Times, Nobel Prize-winning economist Paul Krugman has characterized the Tax Foundation as "not a reliable source" while criticizing a report by the Tax Foundation comparing corporate tax rates in the United States to those in other countries. Krugman has also accused the Tax Foundation of "deliberate fraud" in connection with a report it issued concerning the American Jobs Act. The Tax Foundation has published various responses to Krugman's criticisms.

In an open letter, seventy five academics accused the Tax Foundation of promoting conservative policy through its TaxEDU curriculum project providing educational materials to schools. The letter said “TaxEDU offers a particular perspective on complex and controversial issues without offering any competing views...In its current form the TaxEDU materials are not fit for use.”

== See also ==
- Americans For Fair Taxation
- Americans for Tax Reform
- Citizens for Tax Justice
- Council on State Taxation
- Institute on Taxation and Economic Policy
- National Taxpayers Union
- Tax Policy Center
- Tax Justice Network
