= Steven T. Miller =

American Commissioner of Internal Revenue from 2012 to 2013

Steven Miller

Commissioner of Internal Revenue
- Acting
- In office November 10, 2012 – May 22, 2013
- President: Barack Obama
- Preceded by: Douglas Shulman
- Succeeded by: Daniel Werfel (Acting)

Personal details
- Born: c. 1956 (age 69–70)
- Education: University of Maryland, College Park (BA); George Washington University (JD); Georgetown University (LLM)

Steven T. Miller (born c. 1956) is a former American government official who served as the acting Commissioner of Internal Revenue from 2012 to 2013.

He has a Bachelor of Arts degree from the University of Maryland, a Juris Doctor degree from George Washington University, and a Master of Laws degree in taxation from Georgetown University Law School.

During his career at the IRS he was acting Assistant Commissioner and Special Assistant to the Assistant Commissioner, Employee Plans/Exempt Organizations; Commissioner of the Tax Exempt and Government Entities Division; Commissioner of the Large Business and International Division; and Deputy Commissioner for Services and Enforcement.

Miller became acting IRS commissioner on November 9, 2012, the day after Barack Obama was elected to a second term when Doug Shulman stepped down saying he did not want a second five-year term. Miller submitted his resignation on May 15, 2013, in the wake of the 2013 IRS scandal in which the Treasury Inspector General for Tax Administration released an audit report confirming that the IRS used inappropriate criteria to identify potential political cases on 501(c)(4) applications. Some of these included organizations with Tea Party in their names.

He later joined the tax advisory firm alliantgroup as national director of tax.

Government offices
Preceded by Douglas Shulman	Commissioner of Internal Revenue; 2012–2013Acting	Succeeded by Daniel Werfel; Acting
