= Institute on Taxation and Economic Policy =

U.S. non-profit non-partisan tax think tank

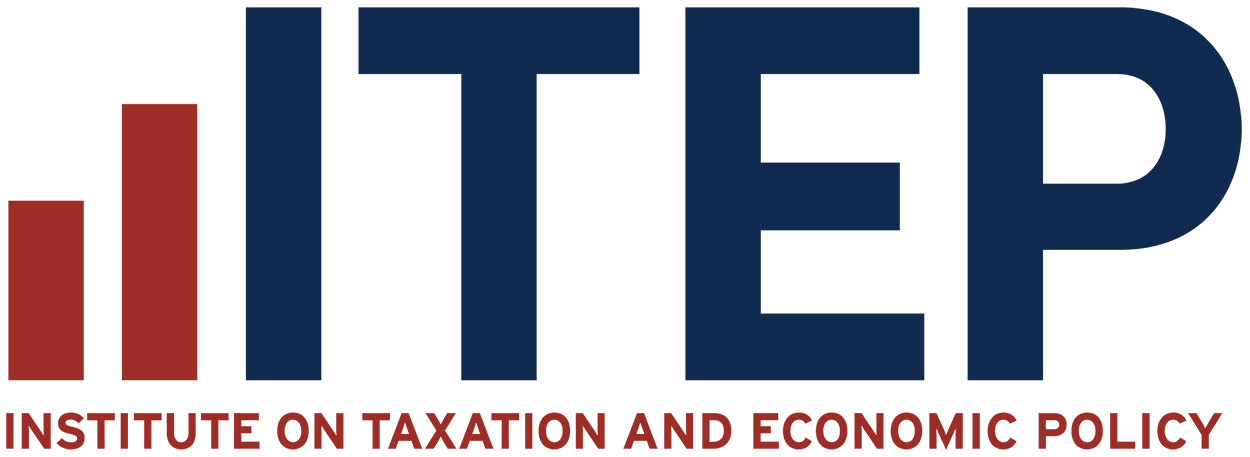
- Abbreviation: ITEP
- Formation: 1980
- Type: Public Policy Think Tank
- Headquarters: 1301 Connecticut Avenue, NW, Suite 220, Washington, DC 20036
- Location: Washington, DC
- Revenue: $8.49M (2025)
- Expenses: $4.82M (2025)
- Website: itep.org

The Institute on Taxation and Economic Policy (ITEP) is a non-profit, left-leaning think tank that works on state and federal tax policy issues. ITEP was founded in 1980, and is a 501(c)(3) tax-exempt organization. The executive director of ITEP is Amy Hanauer.

== Credibility across political spectrum ==
ITEP's experts and reports are frequently quoted and cited by major media outlets. Its quantitative analysis is utilized by observers from across the political spectrum and by analysts within government.

ITEP has been characterized as nonpartisan and left-leaning.

It is associated with the liberal lobbying organization Citizens for Tax Justice.

== See also ==
- Center for American Progress
- Center on Budget and Policy Priorities
- Economic Policy Institute
- Tax Foundation
- Tax Policy Center
