= Charles Rettig =

American attorney (born 1956)

Chuck Rettig
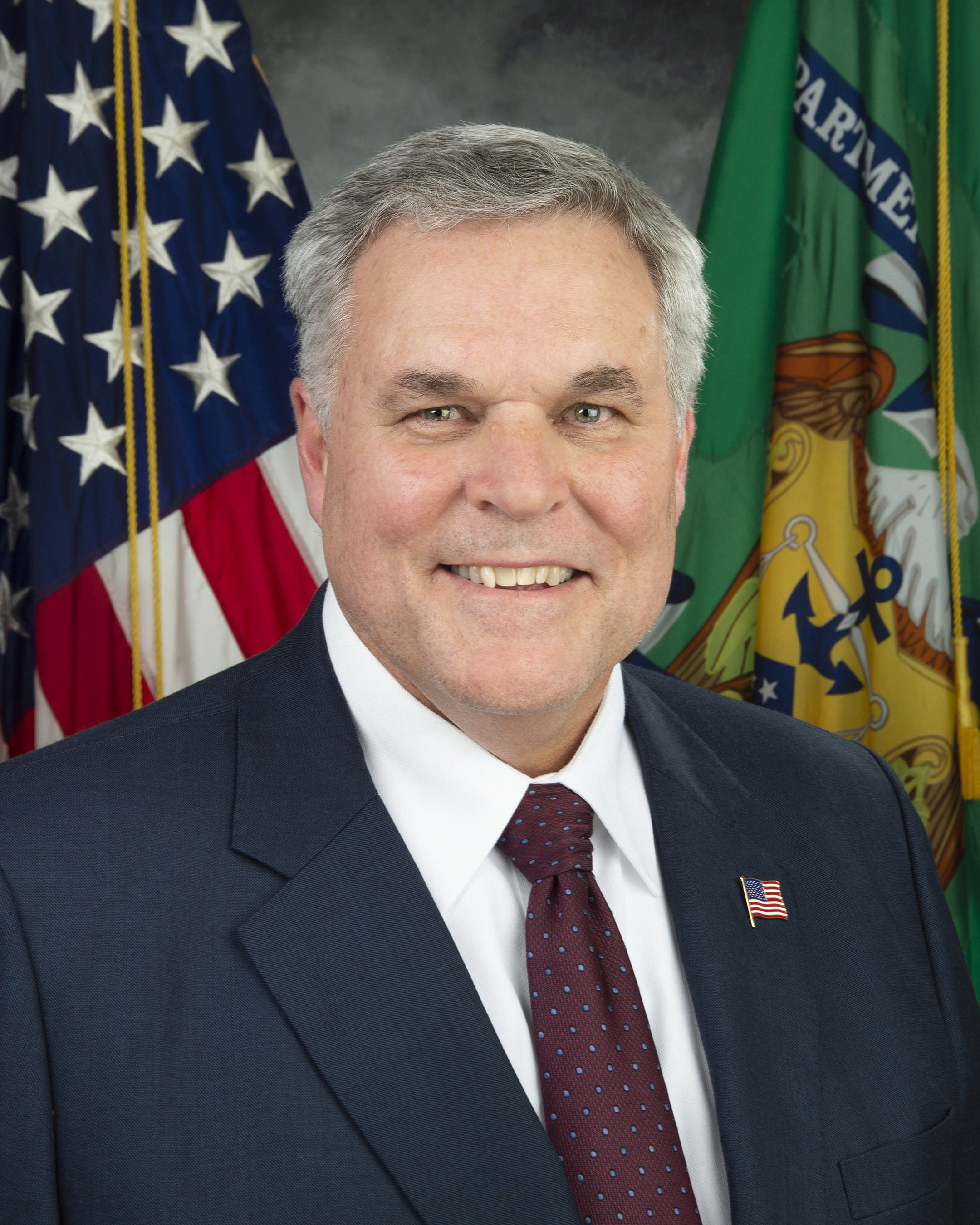

49th Commissioner of Internal Revenue
- In office October 1, 2018 – November 12, 2022
- President: Donald Trump; Joe Biden
- Preceded by: John Koskinen
- Succeeded by: Daniel Werfel

Personal details
- Born: Charles Paul Rettig; November 18, 1956 (age 69) Los Angeles, California, U.S.
- Spouse: Tam Rettig
- Children: 4, including 2 stepsons
- Education: University of California, Los Angeles (BA); Pepperdine University (JD); New York University (LLM)

Charles Paul Rettig (born November 18, 1956) is an American attorney who served as the United States Commissioner of Internal Revenue, the head of the U.S. Internal Revenue Service (IRS). On September 12, 2018, the United States Senate confirmed Rettig's nomination to be Commissioner for the term expiring November 12, 2022. Rettig was sworn in on October 1, 2018.

== Education ==
Rettig attended El Camino Real High School in Woodland Hills, California, graduating in 1974. He earned a Bachelor of Arts in economics from the University of California, Los Angeles, a Juris Doctor from Pepperdine University School of Law, and an LL.M. in Taxation from New York University School of Law.

== Career ==
Following the conclusion of his term as IRS Commissioner, Rettig joined Chamberlain Hrdlicka in March 2024 as a shareholder in the firm's Tax Controversy & Litigation practice. Drawing on over 36 years of experience representing taxpayers in complex disputes and his tenure overseeing the IRS, his practice focuses on federal and state tax controversies and investigations, including sensitive issue examinations, administrative appeals, civil tax litigation, and representation in criminal tax investigations and prosecutions.

Rettig was a partner at the Beverly Hills tax controversy practice law firm of Hochman, Salkin, Rettig, Toscher & Perez, P.C. He worked at the firm for over 36 years, where he represented individuals and corporations before federal and state taxing authorities. The firm has 10 attorneys and was established in 1960.

Rettig held leadership roles in a number of professional organizations. He was President of the American College of Tax Counsel (ACTC); was Chair of the 4,000+ member Taxation Section of the State Bar of California from 1999 to 2000; the longtime Chair of the UCLA Extension Annual Tax Controversy Institute; and served as vice-chair, Administration, for the 12,000+ member Taxation Section of the American Bar Association.

In 2010–2011, Rettig was appointed by the IRS to serve as Chairman of the IRS Advisory Council (IRSAC) for the last year of his three-year term. The IRSAC's primary purpose is to provide an organized public forum for senior IRS executives and representatives of the public to discuss relevant tax administration issues.

In his home state of California, Rettig was a longtime member of the California FTB Advisory Board. He was designated a Certified Specialist in Taxation Law by the State Bar of California, Board of Legal Specialization and also designated a Certified Specialist in Estate Planning, Trust & Probate Law by the State Bar of California, Board of Legal Specialization. He is a past member of the board of trustees for the California CPA Education Foundation.

=== Commissioner ===
On February 13, 2018, Rettig's nomination was received in the Senate and referred to the Committee on Finance. During his confirmation hearing before the Senate Finance Committee on June 28, 2018, Rettig "told lawmakers he would ensure that the agency is 'impartial and non-biased from top to bottom' and follows the law." The committee approved his nomination on July 19, 2018. Rettig's nomination was confirmed by the full Senate by a vote of 64–33 on September 12, 2018. Secretary Mnuchin administered the oath of office to Rettig on October 1, 2018.

In May 2018, four months prior to Rettig's confirmation as commissioner, the IRS planned to cut 2,200 employees as part of its FY 2019 budget. Rettig's proposed FY 2020 budget included cuts of an additional 1,800 employees. (Since FY 2010, IRS staffing has decreased by about 19 percent, primarily in compliance and enforcement.)

On May 21, 2019, Lloyd Doggett, a Member of the U.S. House of Representatives from Texas, called for Rettig to be jailed for not turning over then-President Donald Trump's tax returns.

Rettig continued his duties as IRS Commissioner under the Biden administration. In May 2021, ProPublica published reported incomes and tax payments of Jeff Bezos, Warren Buffett, and Elon Musk as part of an investigative report about tax avoidance by the very wealthy. Taxpayer information is confidential however, and it is a criminal violation for IRS employees to release it to the public or press. In response to questioning by the U.S. Senate's Finance Committee, Rettig said that he would launch an investigation into the potential source of the ProPublica article detailing the billionaires' tax returns.

=== Relationship to Trump administration ===
In 2016, prior to being nominated to his post in the IRS by Trump, Rettig wrote an op-ed in Forbes defending Trump's decision not to release his tax returns. The piece also critiqued the work of what Rettig called a "wealth squad" within the IRS that targeted high-income individuals for audits.

At his nomination, Rettig received criticism "for failing to disclose that he had a stake in two rental units in Hawaii at a Trump-branded hotel." "Rettig previously noted the existence of those properties on his disclosure form but did not specify that they were located at a Trump-branded hotel. Instead, he described them at the time as a 'Honolulu, Hawai’i residential rental property.'”

=== Other activities ===
Rettig is active in numerous civic and philanthropic activities. He co-founded the UCLA Extension Vets Count Scholarship Fund, designed to provide scholarships for active duty and retired military personnel who are working to realize their career goals in tax, accounting, wealth management, and other areas of the financial services industry as well as basic coursework for personal growth in budgeting, financial literacy, and investing. Also, according to his official IRS bio, he's "active in the Wounded Warrior Project, Advance Guard." The Advance Guard is a charitable "monthly giving program" in which participants donate a minimum of $19 per month by check or credit card. According to Rettig's law firm biography on the website of his former firm, he's an associate member of the Academy of Magical Arts.

Government offices
Preceded by John Koskinen	Commissioner of Internal Revenue; 2018–2022	Succeeded by Doug O'Donnell; Acting
