= J. Russell George =

American attorney (1963–2024)

Russell George
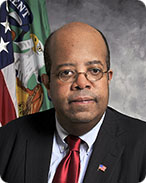

Treasury Inspector General for Tax Administration
- In office December 12, 2004 – January 1, 2024
- President: George W. Bush; Barack Obama; Donald Trump; Joe Biden
- Preceded by: Pamela Gardiner (acting)
- Succeeded by: Heather M. Hill (acting)

Inspector General of the Corporation for National and Community Service
- In office July 29, 2002 – December 12, 2004
- President: George W. Bush
- Preceded by: Terry Bathen (acting)
- Succeeded by: Carol Bates (acting)

Personal details
- Born: October 8, 1963; New York City, U.S.
- Died: January 1, 2024 (aged 60)
- Education: Howard University (BA); Harvard University (JD)

Joey Russell George (October 8, 1963 – January 1, 2024) was an American attorney who served as the Treasury Inspector General for Tax Administration at the Internal Revenue Service from 2004 until his death in 2024.

== Early life and education ==
Born in New York City on October 8, 1963, George attended public schools, including Brooklyn Technical High School. He then received his Bachelor of Arts degree from Howard University and Juris Doctor from Harvard Law School.

== Career ==
After graduating from law school, George worked as a prosecutor. He then served as Assistant General Counsel in the Office of Management and Budget. He later served as Associate Director for Policy in the Corporation for National and Community Service before returning to New York City and practicing law at Kramer Levin Naftalis & Frankel.

In 1995, George began serving as the Staff Director and Chief Counsel of the United States House Committee on Oversight and Reform and of the Subcommittee on Government Efficiency, Financial Management and Intergovernmental Relations, then chaired by Representative Steve Horn. George was nominated to serve as Inspector General of the Corporation for National and Community Service by George W. Bush in 2002. In 2004, he became the Treasury Inspector General for Tax Administration, and subsequently served under four presidents. In 2013, George testified before Congress in the IRS targeting controversy.

== Death ==
J. Russell George died on January 1, 2024.
