= Douglas O'Donnell =

American government official

Doug O'Donnell
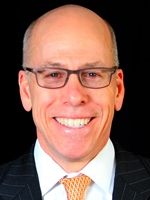
- O'Donnell in 2022

Commissioner of Internal Revenue
- Acting; January 20, 2025 – February 28, 2025
- President: Donald Trump
- Preceded by: Daniel Werfel
- Succeeded by: Melanie Krause (acting)
- Acting; November 13, 2022 – March 13, 2023
- President: Joe Biden
- Preceded by: Charles P. Rettig
- Succeeded by: Daniel Werfel

Deputy Commissioner of Internal Revenue
- In office January 9, 2024 – February 28, 2025
- President: Joe Biden
- Succeeded by: Melanie Krause

Personal details
- Education: University of Maryland, College Park (BS)

Douglas O'Donnell is an American government official who served as acting Commissioner of Internal Revenue from November 2022 to March 2023, and later from January 2025 until his retirement on February 28, 2025.

== Early life and education ==
O'Donnell graduated from the University of Maryland, College Park with a Bachelor of Science degree in accounting.

== Career ==
O'Donnell began his IRS career as a revenue agent in Washington, DC in 1986. He was licensed as a Certified Public Accountant in the state of Maryland. He eventually became Deputy Commissioner (International) in LB&I, Assistant Deputy Commissioner (International) in LB&I, Director of Competent Authority & International Coordination, Director of International Compliance, Strategy & Policy, deputy director, Pre-Filing and Technical Guidance, then the Director of Field Operations, Heavy Manufacturing and Transportation Industry. He then spent six years as the Commissioner of the IRS Large Business and International (LB&I) Division, followed by becoming the Deputy Commissioner for Services and Enforcement before becoming the Commissioner of Internal Revenue on November 13, 2022.

On February 25, 2025, it was announced that O'Donnell would retire on February 28, to be succeeded as both deputy and acting commissioner by Melanie Krause.

Government offices
Preceded by Charles P. Rettig	Commissioner of Internal Revenue; Acting; 2022–2023	Succeeded by Daniel Werfel
Preceded by Daniel Werfel	Commissioner of Internal Revenue; Acting; 2025	Succeeded by Melanie Krause; Acting
New title	Deputy Commissioner of Internal Revenue; 2024–2025	Succeeded by Melanie Krause
