= Citizens for Tax Justice =

American think tank and advocacy group

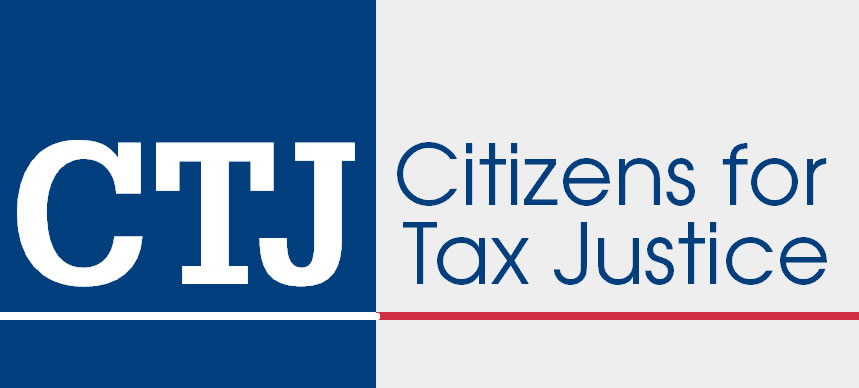
- Abbreviation: CTJ
- Formation: 1979
- Type: Public policy think tank
- Headquarters: 1616 P Street, NW Suite 200, Washington, D.C. 20036
- Location: Washington, D.C., U.S.
- Revenue: $102,000 (2024)
- Expenses: $194,000 (2024)
- Website: ctj.org

Citizens for Tax Justice (CTJ) is a Washington, D.C.–based think tank and advocacy group founded in 1979 focusing on tax policies and their impact. CTJ's work focuses primarily on federal tax policy, but also analyzes state and local tax policies.

CTJ is generally considered a liberal organization, but its research has also been cited by Republican politicians (including President Ronald Reagan) and right-wing tax reform organizations. The organization's 2013 Form 990 Tax Return states its purpose is "to promote social welfare."

CTJ is a 501(c4) organization headed by Amy Hanauer.

== History ==
CTJ was founded in 1979 by labor unions and public interest groups in response to the growing anti-tax movement's recent passage of California's Proposition 13. Shortly thereafter, CTJ's sister organization, the Institute on Taxation and Economic Policy (ITEP), was created as its 501(c)(3) charitable partner.

In the late 1980s and early 1990s, CTJ was closely involved with the Tobacco Institute and other labor groups to oppose excise taxes on cigarettes as regressive and harmful to the poor.

CTJ's reports are often cited in the media and by lawmakers. Additionally, CTJ analysts have frequently testified before Congress and other bodies, such as President Obama's National Commission on Fiscal Responsibility and Reform. CTJ has been described as "one of the principal sources of information for liberal Democrats on matters of tax policy."

=== 1986 Tax Reform Act ===
CTJ's most visible impact on U.S. tax policy was its role in bringing about the enactment of the Tax Reform Act of 1986. In addition to cutting tax rates, the Tax Reform Act of 1986 also simplified and broadened the tax base, and eliminated numerous tax shelters. CTJ described the Act as "path-breaking federal legislation that curbed tax shelters for corporations and the rich and cut taxes for poor and middle-income families." The Tax Foundation, a group generally considered to be on the opposite end of the political spectrum from CTJ, has described the Act as "one of the most significant pieces of legislation ever passed."

CTJ's impact on the debate came in the form of four reports detailing the magnitude of corporate tax avoidance, and making the case for comprehensive corporate tax reform: "Corporate Income Taxes in the Reagan Years" (1984), "Corporate Taxpayers & Corporate Freeloaders" (1985), "Money for Nothing: The Failure of Corporate Tax Incentives, 1981–1984" (1986), and "130 Reasons Why We Need Tax Reform" (1986). These reports revealed, among other things, that 128 large corporations had paid nothing in corporate income taxes in at least one of the previous three years.

In his memoirs, former U.S. Treasury Secretary Donald Regan recalls referencing a finding made in one of CTJ's reports when he explained to President Reagan that "your secretary paid more in federal taxes last year than ... General Electric ... Boeing, General Dynamics, and 57 other big corporations." After admitting that "I didn’t realize things had gotten that far out of line", Reagan threw his support behind the push to close corporate loopholes.

McClatchy Newspapers has said that CTJ's work "sparked national outrage that helped pave the way for The Tax Reform Act of 1986." The Washington Post described the release of these reports as a "key turning point" in the process of enacting the Act.

University of Connecticut law professor Richard Pomp described the CTJ studies as having had "a profound effect on educating the public and on shaping public opinion, unlike previous studies relying on only statistical aggregates", and declared that "one of the major catalysts for the corporate reforms made by the Tax Reform Act of 1986 was the disclosure by Citizens for Tax Justice (CTJ) of the nominal amount of income tax paid by some of the largest corporations in the country."

A 1988 article in The Washington Monthly proclaimed CTJ was one of the "best public interest groups" in the nation. The magazine described CTJ's work as having "helped set the stage for one of the most dramatic defeats that special interest groups have ever suffered: the 1986 overhaul of the federal tax code."

=== 2001 Bush tax cut debate ===
In 2001, with Republicans in control of the White House and both houses of Congress, both the Treasury Department and the Joint Committee on Taxation were encouraged not to produce distributional tables explaining the impact of President Bush's proposed tax cuts. Republicans were reported to have "never liked that kind of measurement, saying it contributed to class warfare." As a result, data released by CTJ, produced using the ITEP Microsimulation Tax Model, was the primary source of information on which opponents of the tax cuts had to rely.

The New York Times described CTJ's Director, Bob McIntyre, as having "no doubt ... exerted more influence on the tax debate this year than any lobbyist in town." In a similar vein, Senator Kent Conrad of North Dakota said "I don’t know what we’d do without Bob McIntyre. The agencies of government that are supposed to provide this information don’t, and the only way we can get it is from Bob." Despite CTJ's role in stoking the opposition to the 2001 cuts, the plan did eventually pass.

=== 2009 health care debate ===
During the 2009 debates over President Barack Obama's Affordable Care Act proposal, CTJ produced a series of reports detailing the revenue and distributional effects of a number of potential options for financing those reforms.

An expansion of the Medicare tax first proposed by CTJ was incorporated into the package that Obama signed into law.

=== Political campaigns ===
CTJ often analyzes the distributional and revenue impact of tax policy proposals made by candidates for public office. Those estimates have been frequently cited by the media, as well as by candidates themselves.

== Funding ==
CTJ's funding comes from donations by individuals, labor unions, and other organizations.

== Publications ==
Many of the reports written by Citizens for Tax Justice rely on analyses produced by the "ITEP Microsimulation Tax Model", which is housed at its partner organization, the Institute on Taxation and Economic Policy (ITEP). Revenue and distributional estimates of current federal tax policies, as well as of policies proposed by members of Congress, the President, presidential nominees, or CTJ itself are the topic of a large number of the organization's reports.

CTJ has also published a significant number of reports analyzing the financial statements of large corporations in order to calculate their effective corporate income tax rates. The first of those reports was released in 1984.

== See also ==
- Center for American Progress
- Center for Economic and Policy Research
- Center on Budget and Policy Priorities
- Economic Policy Institute
- Tax Foundation
- Tax Policy Center
