= Linchpins of Liberty v. United States =

- Court: United States Court of Appeals for the District of Columbia Circuit
- Full case name: Linchpins of Liberty v. United States
- Argued: May 29 2013

Linchpins of Liberty v. United States (1:13-cv-00777) is a case decided in the United States Court of Appeals for the District of Columbia Circuit, in which the IRS agreed to a formal apology to all plaintiffs of the case. The IRS targeting groups based on a political viewpoint received widespread national attention.

== Background ==
In May 2013, the Associated Press and The New York Times reported that the Internal Revenue Service (IRS) flagged groups for review of their applications for tax-exempt status, based on their names or policy positions, during the 2012 election. This included targeting conservative and liberal groups, and led to both political and public condemnation of the agency, and triggered multiple investigations. Jay Sekulow, who represented 16 Tea Party groups in the courts in this case, said that "This admission by the IRS represents a significant victory for free speech and freedom of association. There was never any doubt that these organizations complied with the law and applied for tax-exempt status for their activities as Americans have done for decades"

After an initial two-year investigation, the Justice Department announced in October 2015 that "We found no evidence that any IRS official acted based on political, discriminatory, corrupt, or other inappropriate motives that would support a criminal prosecution."

In October 2017, the Treasury Department's inspector general reported that the I.R.S. had targeted both liberal and conservative groups, flagging organization names with terms that included "Tea Party", "Patriot", "Progressive", and "Occupy."

As a result of final agreements and the issuance of a Consent Order, the IRS has formally acknowledged its wrongdoing and treatment of the plaintiffs in this case:

The IRS admits that its treatment of Plaintiffs during the tax-exempt determinations process, including screening their applications based on their names or policy positions, subjecting those applications to heightened scrutiny and inordinate delays, and demanding of some Plaintiffs' information that TIGTA determined was unnecessary to the agency's determination of their tax-exempt status, was wrong. For such treatment, the IRS expresses its sincere apology.
