= Treasury Inspector General for Tax Administration =

Office in the United States Federal government

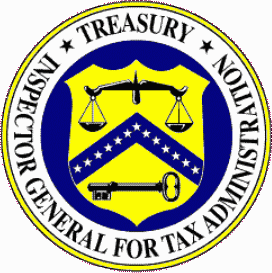

Agency overview
- Formed: January 1999
- Agency executive: Heather M. Hill, Treasury Inspector General for Tax Administration (acting)
- Website: https://www.treasury.gov/tigta/

The Treasury Inspector General for Tax Administration (TIGTA) is an office in the United States federal government. It was established in January 1999 in accordance with the Internal Revenue Service Restructuring and Reform Act of 1998 (RRA 98) to provide independent oversight of Internal Revenue Service (IRS) activities. As mandated by RRA 98, TIGTA assumed most of the responsibilities of the IRS' former Inspection Service.

TIGTA provides independent oversight of Department of the Treasury matters involving IRS activities, the IRS Oversight Board, and the IRS Office of Chief Counsel. TIGTA's audits, investigations, and inspections are designed to promote the fair administration of the Federal tax system.

Although TIGTA is organizationally placed within the Department of the Treasury, and reports to the Secretary of the Treasury and to Congress, TIGTA functions independently of the Department and all other Treasury offices and bureaus.

TIGTA's Office of Investigations protects the integrity of the IRS and its ability to collect tax revenue. It investigates allegations related to fraud, waste, abuse, and mismanagement concerning IRS activities, and protects the IRS against external attempts to corrupt, threaten, or interfere with its employees. This mission is accomplished through proactive and reactive investigative programs.

TIGTA operates a hotline unit in Washington, DC, for the intake of allegations of wrongdoing. Examples of specific allegations that should be reported include, but are not limited to: attempts by taxpayers to bribe IRS personnel; extortion or misuse of position by IRS personnel; assaults and/or threats by taxpayers against IRS employees; schemes involving the use of computer technology or mail that impersonate the IRS or IRS personnel; misconduct by tax practitioners (falsification of qualifications, theft of IRS tax remittances and theft of IRS tax refunds).

TIGTA's ability to serve the public is dependent on the diligence of IRS employees in reporting wrongdoing. Any indication of fraud, waste, mismanagement, or abuse should be reported to TIGTA directly or through the employee's supervisor. IRS managers are responsible for ensuring that all allegations they receive are promptly reported to TIGTA.

Federal law prohibits reprisal or retaliation against an employee who reports wrongdoing.

The Office of Investigations (OI) investigates complaints and allegations against IRS employees. Special agents will conduct all leads to prove or disprove the elements of the violation, or to show that the issue cannot be resolved. The results of investigations are submitted to IRS management without recommendation as to any action to be taken.

Misconduct by TIGTA employees should be reported to the Special Inquiries and Intelligence Division (SIID). The Division is responsible for three distinct missions. SIID is responsible for conducting sensitive investigations involving TIGTA employees, IRS Oversight Board Members, IRS Senior Executives (Grade 15 and above), IRS Chief Counsel employees, IRS Criminal Investigation employees, and IRS International employees located in Washington, D.C., and U.S. embassies abroad. SIID is also responsible for investigating allegations of fraud, waste and abuse involving IRS procurements and procurement-related misconduct by IRS employees and persons outside of the agency. Third, SIID is responsible for coordinating all criminal intelligence collection and dissemination within TIGTA nationwide.

Heather M. Hill is TIGTA's Principal Deputy Inspector General, performing the duties of the Inspector General, following the death of J. Russell George.

== Past Treasury Inspectors General ==
- Heather M. Hill (Principal Deputy Inspector General, performing the duties of the Inspector General) January 1, 2024 – Present
- J. Russell George December 12, 2004 – January 1, 2024
- Pamela J. Gardiner (Acting) August 24, 2002 – December 12, 2004
- David C. Williams May 17, 1999 – August 24, 2002
- Lawrence W. Rogers (Acting) January 18, 1999 – May 17, 1999
