= Tax controversy =

Area of legal practice

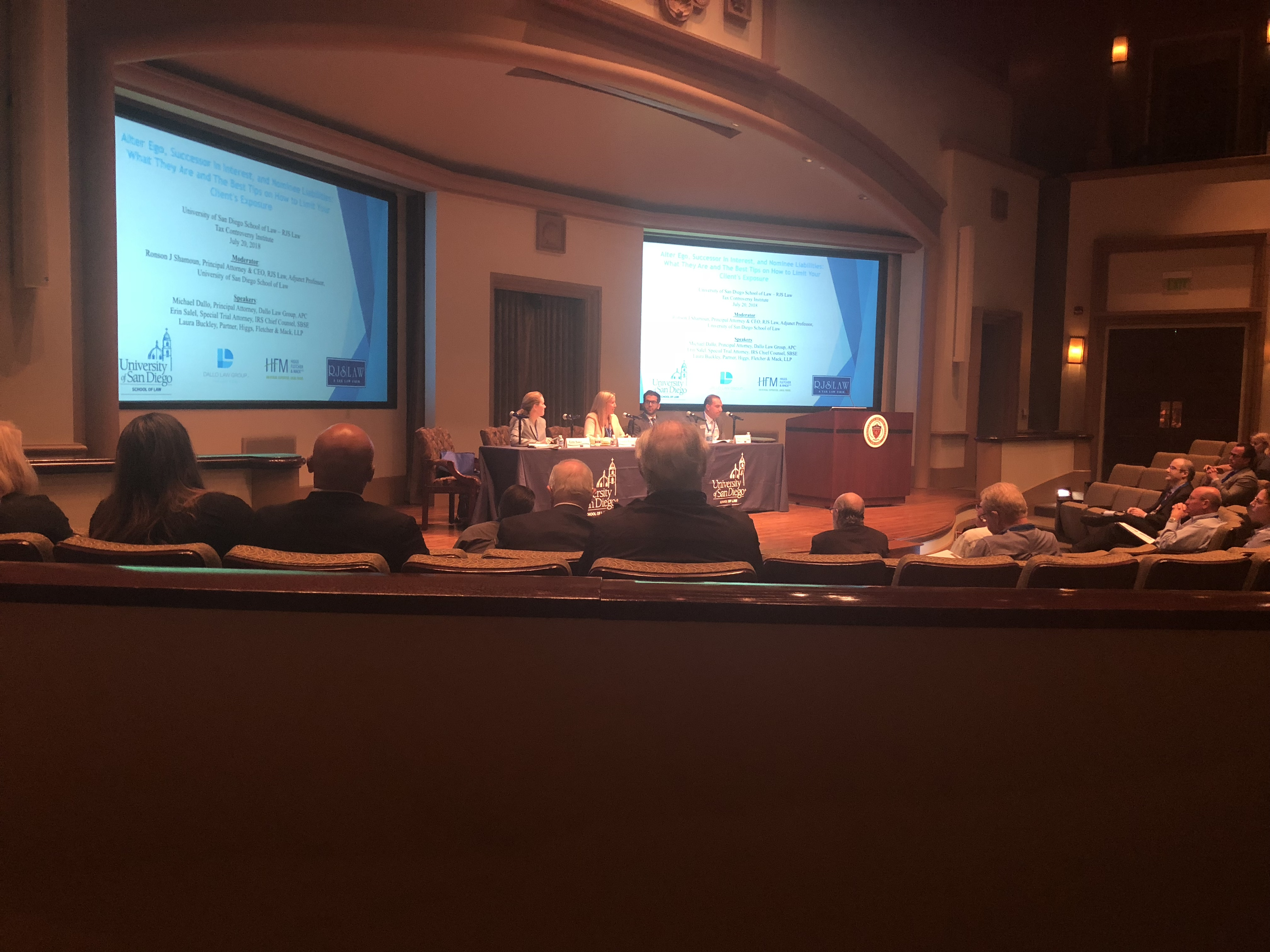
Third Annual USD School of Law - RJS LAW Tax Controversy Institute

Tax controversy is an area of legal practice involving tax disputes between tax collection entities such as the U.S. Internal Revenue Service (IRS), and taxpayers, sometimes as the result of an audit. Legal services offered as part of a typical tax controversy practice can include assistance with audits, dealing with IRS and other tax collection agencies, negotiating settlements and representing taxpayers in the U.S. Tax Court and the U.S. Court of Appeals.

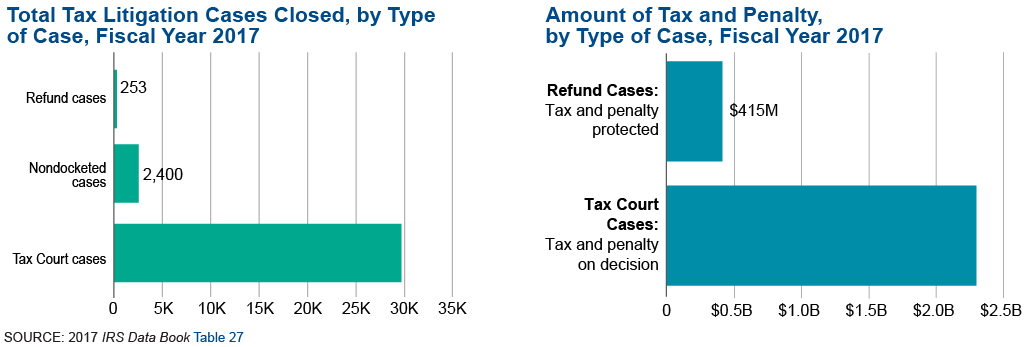
U.S. Tax Court

Many tax controversies end up in the U.S. Tax Court. In an article published by Forbes in 2017, the magazine wrote, "The Tax Court dockets about 30,000 cases a year."

The New York University School of Professional Studies, the University of San Diego School of Law, UCLA Extension and the ABA each hold an annual tax controversy event.
