= Daniel Werfel =

American government official (born 1971)

Danny Werfel
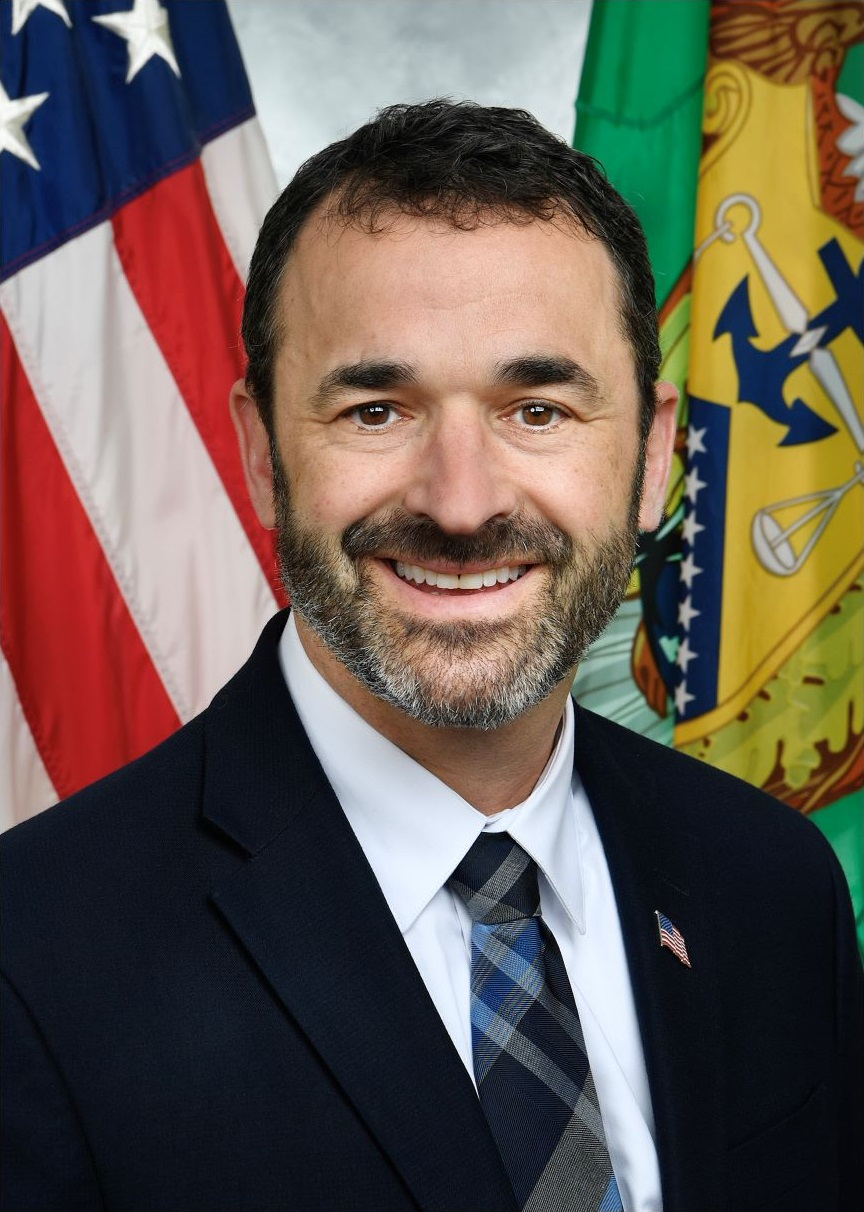
- Official portrait, 2023

50th Commissioner of Internal Revenue
- In office March 13, 2023 – January 20, 2025
- President: Joe Biden
- Deputy: Douglas O'Donnell
- Preceded by: Charles Rettig
- Succeeded by: Billy Long
- Acting; May 15, 2013 – December 23, 2013
- President: Barack Obama
- Preceded by: Steven T. Miller (acting)
- Succeeded by: John Koskinen

Personal details
- Born: 1971 (age 54–55)
- Party: Democratic
- Spouse: Beth Werfel
- Children: 2
- Education: Cornell University (BS); University of North Carolina, Chapel Hill (JD); Duke University (MPP)

Daniel I. Werfel (born 1971) is an American government official who served as Commissioner of Internal Revenue from 2023 to 2025. He was formerly a Managing Director and Partner at Boston Consulting Group (BCG) from 2014 to 2023, acting Commissioner of Internal Revenue in 2013, and Controller of the Office of Management and Budget from 2011 to 2013. Werfel is currently serving as an Executive in Residence at the Johns Hopkins School of Government and Public Policy, a Distinguished Fellow at the Polis Center of Politics at Duke University’s Sanford School of Public Policy, and a member of the Strategic Advisory Board at alliantgroup.

== Early life and education ==
Werfel graduated from John F. Kennedy High School in Plainview on Long Island in 1989. He holds a bachelor's degree in Industrial and Labor Relations from Cornell University, a Juris Doctor from the University of North Carolina School of Law, and a master's degree in public policy from Duke University.

== Career ==
Werfel began his career at the Office of Management and Budget (OMB) in 1997 as a policy analyst in the Office of Information and Regulatory Affairs. Following that, he worked as a trial attorney in the Justice Department's Civil Rights Division. After the Department of Justice, he returned to OMB where he was a budget examiner in the Education Branch, then was promoted to the Senior Executive Service in 2003 and worked as Chief of the Financial Integrity and Analysis Branch within the Office of Federal Financial Management. He was then promoted to the position of Deputy Controller at OMB in 2005 and acting Controller in 2007, during the administration of George W. Bush.

In August 2009, President Barack Obama nominated Werfel to be OMB Controller. The U.S. Senate confirmed him for the position of OMB Controller on October 13, 2009. In January 2011, while retaining the responsibilities of OMB Controller, he also took on the responsibilities of the OMB Deputy Director for Management. While in these roles, he served as OMB's point person on implementation of the American Recovery and Reinvestment Act, the federal government's operational response to a potential shutdown in 2011 by determining which essential services would continue to operate, and the federal government's preparation for the budget sequester. He worked as the controller and acting deputy director for management until May 2013, at which time he was appointed as the acting IRS Commissioner.

On May 15, 2013, he was appointed Acting Commissioner of Internal Revenue by President Obama, after the resignation of the previous Acting Commissioner, Steven T. Miller.

=== Private sector ===
In 2014, Werfel joined Boston Consulting Group as a Director in the firm's Public Sector Practice, based in Washington, D.C. He was elected Managing Director and Partner in July 2017. In 2018, he was selected by BCG's CEO to lead BCG's Public Sector Practice in North America.

=== Return to government service ===
On November 10, 2022, President Joe Biden announced his intent to nominate Werfel as Commissioner of Internal Revenue. On March 9, 2023, Werfel was confirmed by the Senate by a 54–42 vote. He was sworn in by deputy commissioner and former acting commissioner Doug O'Donnell on March 13, 2023, for a term ending November 12, 2027. On January 17, 2025, he announced his intent to resign from the Internal Revenue Service on January 20 when Donald Trump is inaugurated as President.

== Personal life ==
Werfel and his wife Beth have two children, Sean and Molly.

Their cat, Emmett, was featured on the Internal Revenue Service's Instagram account multiple times.

Government offices
Preceded by Steven T. Miller; Acting	Commissioner of Internal Revenue; Acting; 2013	Succeeded by John Koskinen
Preceded by Doug O'Donnell; Acting	Commissioner of Internal Revenue; 2023–2025	Succeeded by Billy Long
