= Ken Kies =

American tax lawyer

Kenneth J. Kies
- Born: Fort Benning
- Education: Ohio University (BGS); Ohio State University College of Law (JD); Georgetown University Law Center (LL.M.)
- Children: 2

Kies before the Senate in 2025

Ken Kies is an American tax lawyer and tax lobbyist who is influential in devising tax avoidance strategies for multinational companies and the ultrawealthy. He was nominated by President Donald Trump to serve as assistant secretary for tax policy at the Treasury Department and confirmed by the Senate in June 2025. Before his appointment, he worked for the Trump Organization.

== Politics and lobbying career ==
Kies was chief tax counsel to Republican members of the House Ways & Means Committee from 1982 to 1987. He helped to write the Tax Reform Act of 1986. In the 1990s, Kies was chief of staff to the congressional Joint Tax Committee where he worked for congress members Bill Archer and William Roth.

In 1998, he joined accounting and lobbying firm PWC where he led an effort against the Bill Clinton administration's attempt to close the "check the box" corporate tax loophole that enabled companies to shift trillions of dollars to offshore tax havens. Kies argued that closing the loophole would harm US-based multinational companies. The effort to close the loophole failed, as there was not enough support for it in Congress. In 2006, Kies lobbied Congress to make the loophole into law, so that it would be harder to revoke. The loophole was made into law as part of a 2006 bill to extend George W. Bush administration tax cuts.

In 2002, Kies criticized an attempt by the IRS to crack down on improper offshore tax-avoidance schemes.

In 2003, Tax Notes ranked Kies as the second-most influential tax lobbyist in Washington D.C.

In 2017, he lobbied for a 20% deduction for some businesses, which overwhelmingly favored the wealthiest Americans. It was passed as part of the first Trump administration's tax cuts, the Tax Cuts and Jobs Act.

In 2019, he testified for Congress, arguing that President Donald Trumps' tax returns should be kept private. He subsequently worked for the Trump Organization.

In 2022, he was hired by to lobby against an I.R.S effort to crack down on the “dirty dozen” list of abusive tax shelters. On a January 2022 call, he said he could use his relationship with Nikole Flax, a top IRS official, to fight the IRS plan. On the call, he said, "If we could actually put people at the I.R.S., the world would be a better place."

On June 26, 2025, the Senate confirmed Kies (53-45) to serve as Assistant Secretary of the Treasury Department for Tax Policy. Kies also served as acting Chief Counsel at the IRS. Kies led the implementation of the One Big Beautiful Bill Act. Kies was reportedly forced out in 2026 after saying that the law prevents the White House from interfering in IRS investigations.
