= Douglas Shulman =

American businessman

Doug Shulman
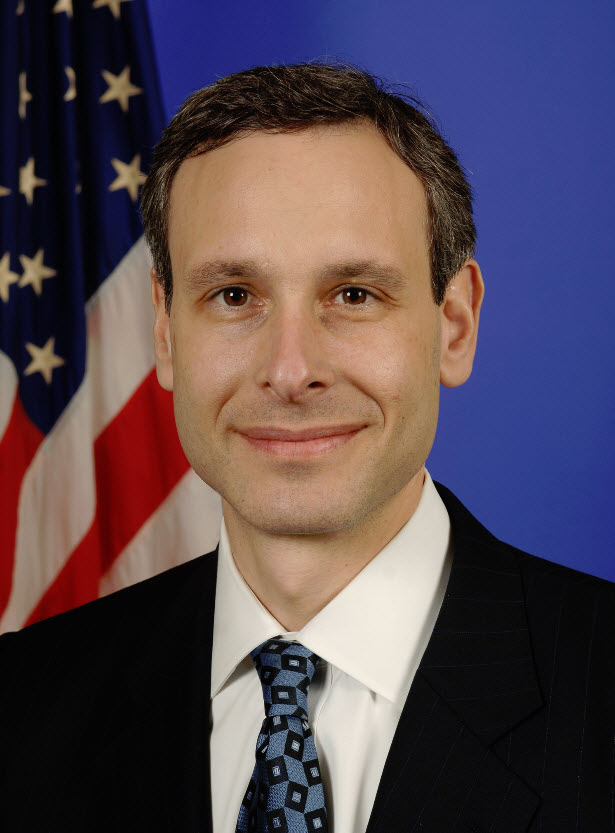

47th Commissioner of Internal Revenue
- In office March 24, 2008 – November 9, 2012
- President: George W. Bush; Barack Obama
- Preceded by: Linda Stiff (acting)
- Succeeded by: Steven T. Miller (acting)

Personal details
- Born: May 10, 1967 (age 59)
- Education: Williams College (BA); Harvard University (MPA); Georgetown University (JD)

Douglas H. "Doug" Shulman (born May 10, 1967) is president and chief executive officer of OneMain Financial. Shulman is a former U.S. commissioner of Internal Revenue.

== Early life and education ==
Shulman was born in 1967 to Jeff and Celia Shulman. He grew up in Oakwood, Ohio (Greater Dayton Area). He graduated from Oakwood High School in 1985. Shulman holds a Bachelor of Arts degree from Williams College, a Master of Public Administration degree from Harvard University's John F. Kennedy School of Government, and a Juris Doctor degree magna cum laude from Georgetown University Law Center.

== Pre-IRS business career ==
Shulman co-founded and served as executive vice president of FoundryOne, Inc., a company focused on building and spinning off technology-focused startups within major corporations. Previously, Shulman was vice president of Darby Overseas Investments, Ltd. and served as a senior policy advisor and as chief of staff for the National Commission on Restructuring the Internal Revenue Service. Shulman began his career as a consultant at A.T. Kearney in New York City.

Shulman came to NASD in 2000. He first served as executive vice president, technology strategy and corporate development, before being promoted to president, markets, services and information. He then was promoted to vice chairman of NASD, and later became vice chairman of the Financial Industry Regulatory Authority (FINRA). He played a key role in the merger between New York Stock Exchange regulatory operations and NASD, which created FINRA. At NASD, he directed NASD's efforts to restructure itself as solely a regulator and spin-off its market subsidiaries. He led the negotiations that resulted in the sale of both the NASDAQ Stock Market and the American Stock Exchange.

He also oversaw NASD's efforts to become active in the fixed income markets by launching the Trade Reporting and Compliance Engine (TRACE), NASD's real-time corporate bond market regulatory and information system. He was the lead executive in negotiating corporate bond transparency with the financial services industry, and hired the team that launched the product. Another main area of focus was heading the successful effort by NASD to modernize its technology systems. He also led NASD into new business segments, and helped it to re-vamp its surveillance technology in order to win contracts to regulate other exchanges besides NASDAQ.

== IRS commissioner ==
=== Nomination ===
On November 22, 2007, Republican President George W. Bush announced he would appoint Shulman to be commissioner of the IRS, despite the fact that Shulman had donated to the Democratic National Committee in the 2004 election. When being questioned by the U.S. Senate Finance Committee in January 2008, he said that the IRS must be "competent, fair and impartial". On March 14, 2008, he was confirmed unanimously by the U.S. Senate to be the 47th IRS commissioner.

Shortly after President Obama was re-elected in the 2012 presidential election, on November 11, 2012, Shulman finished serving out his full term as commissioner.

=== Stimulus packages ===
In March and April 2008, one of his first duties was to send out 77 million tax rebates after congress passed the Economic Stimulus Act of 2008. He also led the IRS after congress passed Obama's $787 billion economic recovery stimulus package.

As part of the stimulus package, also referred to as the American Reinvestment and Recovery Act, about one third of the $787 billion was administered through the tax system. Some of the key provisions that the IRS administered under Shulman's leadership were the first time home buyers credit, net operating loss carrybacks (which allowed businesses to get tax credits when credit lines were frozen), and expanded Earned Income Tax Credit.

=== Offshore accounts ===
One of Shulman's signature initiatives was the cracking down of offshore tax evasion. He is largely credited with being the key leader in shifting the paradigm of tax evasion and bank secrecy. In August 2009, he persuaded Switzerland to turn over the identities of 4,450 Americans with secret UBS bank accounts. UBS paid a $780 million fine. This was the first time that a Swiss bank had ever broken Swiss bank secrecy, and is largely viewed as a watershed event in the erosion of bank secrecy and tax evasion.

Under his leadership, the IRS launched multiple voluntary compliance programs—the offer was to have people who had been hiding money overseas to pay back taxes, pay a penalty, but avoid criminal prosecution. From 2009 to 2011, the IRS collected $4.4 billion from 33,000 people who had offshore accounts. He said it was an "amount we never thought we'd reach. If we catch people before they come in voluntarily, it's going to be a much worse outcome for the taxpayer." In January 2012, he revived a program that would be even more strict toward offshore accounts. He said the "long-term goal is deterrence. We want to wake up and have the next generation of taxpayers not even think about hiding their assets overseas."

=== Healthcare reform ===
The IRS was given major responsibilities for the money flows of the affordable care act. The provisions that the IRS needed to prepare for under Shulman's leadership included the individual mandate, the employer mandate, insurance company reporting of fact of coverage, and financial data for exchanges to make determinations regarding who is eligible for tax credits. There were also a number of tax provisions in which the health care industry would pay taxes to help offset the costs of the Affordable Care Act, and tax credits for small businesses to buy insurance. The mandate that individuals buy insurance or pay a fine garnered a lot of attention.

In April 2010, Shulman said that taxpayers' refunds in order to collect fines from those who don't buy health coverage via Affordable Health Care for America Act. In response to Republican arguments that the IRS would abuse their powers, he said he would not allow the IRS to be "too punitive".

=== Modernizing the IRS's technology ===
While serving as commissioner, Shulman led a major modernization of the IRS's technology to streamline tax payment processing, facilitate compliance, and improve customer service. The core of the modernization was to move all tax returns to daily processing, as opposed to the historical batch processing of returns (every one or two weeks). The result was the customer service representatives could have access to accurate data and there was real time information to combat non-compliance, including refund fraud. The goal of daily processing was a goal that had eluded the IRS since it was first set in 1988.

When Shulman came to the IRS, the modernization effort was off-track and over budget. Under Shulman's leadership, the program was turned around. In 2011, the Government Accountability Office listed the program as one of seven successful major IT acquisitions across government, an achievement which attributes to strong management and oversight, and "executive-level focus and attention".

Shulman focused on completing the modernization during his term that would end in 2012. He recruited a new team to build the database and secured funding. On January 17, 2012, Shulman oversaw the transition to the Customer Account Data Engine 2, moving the data of 140 million taxpayers into a modern database environment. This was the first successful major upgrade of the IRS data repository for more than 50 years.

In addition to modernizing IRS's core technology, Shulman also significantly increased electronic filing of tax returns when he was commissioner. This digitization effort led to better customer service and more efficiency at the IRS. By the end of his tenure, approximately 80% of all individual tax returns were filed electronically.

=== Policy on aiding Madoff victims ===
The IRS released a number of guidelines to help the 4,800 victims of the Bernie Madoff $65 billion scandal. Shulman said the IRS will allow the amount of the theft loss to include the investor's unrecoverable investment for Ponzi scheme victims. Victims who are part of small businesses will be able to go back 5 years to recover investments and so-called "phantom profits".

=== Tea Party controversy / 2013 IRS scandal ===
Douglas Shulman was the commissioner of the IRS during some of the time when new criteria, including the name of organizations, were used to identify tax exempt applications for review. However, Douglas Shulman was not mentioned in the Inspector General report that uncovered and detailed this issue. In a congressional hearing held on May 21, 2013, Douglas Shulman denied responsibility for the policy, stating that he found out some facts, but not all the facts about a list of names, from Steven T. Miller and at that time he was also informed that the practice had been stopped and the issue had been referred to the Inspector General for review.

In May 2013, he told Republican U.S. Senator John Cornyn "I certainly am not personally responsible for making a list that had inappropriate criteria on it. With that said, this happened on my watch, and I very much regret that this happened on my watch."

== Post-IRS business career ==
On July 13, 2018, OneMain Holdings, Inc., announced Shulman as its next President and Chief Executive Officer.

Earlier, he was an executive at BNY Mellon and had been a Senior Advisor with McKinsey & Company.

Government offices
Preceded by Linda Stiff; Acting	Commissioner of Internal Revenue; 2008–2012	Succeeded by Steven T. Miller; Acting
