= Council on State Taxation =

American trade association

Council On State Taxation (COST)
- Company type: Trade association
- Founded: Washington, D.C., U.S. (1969)
- Headquarters: Washington, D.C., United States
- Area served: North America
- Website: http://www.cost.org/

The Council on State Taxation (COST) is a state tax organization representing business taxpayers. COST is a non-profit trade association based in Washington, D.C. consisting of approximately 550 multistate corporations engaged in interstate and international business.

COST was formed in 1969 as the "Committee on State Taxation" by a handful of companies under the sponsorship of the Council of State Chambers of Commerce, an organization with which COST remains associated. In 2000, the organization changed its name to "Council on State Taxation". COST's objective is to preserve and promote equitable and nondiscriminatory state and local taxation of multijurisdictional business entities.

== Membership ==
COST membership is exclusive, only multistate businesses that are not engaged in tax advising or consulting may apply for membership. As a member of COST, a business will have access to the following benefits:

- Participation in COST's renowned conferences and schools
- Access to a national network of corporate state tax professionals sharing technical knowledge
- Able to shape and benefit from COST's legislative, regulatory and judicial advocacy
- Tax savings as a result of identifying tax saving opportunities.

== Education ==
COST offers education opportunities. COST events include:

- SALT Basics School
- Sales Tax Conference and Audit Session
- Spring Audit Session and Income Tax Conference
- Forum on U.S. State and Local Taxes for European Companies
- Intermediate/Advanced Sales and Use Tax School
- Intermediate/Advanced State Income Tax School
- Forum on U.S. State and Local Taxes for Canadian Companies
- Annual Meeting (including Members-Only Audit Sessions)
- Indirect State Tax Workshop
- Property Tax Workshop
- Canadian Taxes for U.S. Companies Workshop
- Approximately 40 Regional Meetings held in cities throughout the U.S.

All COST programs qualify with state boards of accountancy and state bar associations for continuing education credits.

== Advocacy ==
COST's advocacy program is oriented toward active involvement on state tax issues of broad importance to the membership. COST advocates on behalf of its membership in the legislative, judicial and administrative arenas. State and local government policymakers rely heavily on COST staff in formulating, implementing, and changing the state tax landscape. COST's reputation as the nationwide voice of corporate taxpayers has garnered respect from the leadership of the National Conference of State Legislatures, the Federation of Tax Administrators, the National Governors Association, and even the Multistate Tax Commission. COST's involvement in an issue on behalf of its corporate membership signals to state leaders that the issue is one of importance. COST also serves as a resource on business tax issues to other organizations, including State Chambers of Commerce and state taxpayer associations, as those groups develop strategies to address complex state tax matters.

COST disseminates information on pertinent legislative, judicial and regulatory developments through regular publications, and coordinates advocacy activities with members and other sympathetic parties. COST files amicus briefs with state and federal courts, provides testimony (oral and written) before legislative and administrative bodies, meets regularly with state policymakers, and brings together interested members to enhance advocacy activities on targeted issues.

== Public policy goals ==
1. "COST will educate policymakers and the public regarding the state and local tax system and businesses direct and indirect contributions to the state and local tax system. COST will further educate policymakers and the public regarding the state and local tax system's impact on business, jobs and investment."
  - To this end, COST has offered continuing education instruction related to state and local taxes.
2. "COST will regularly evaluate the state and local tax system to determine whether the statutes, rules, legal decisions and policies governing tax administration are fair, efficient and customer-focused."
3. "COST will work to improve tax administration where it is not fair, efficient and customer-focused. Wherever possible, COST will see to partner on these efforts with the Federation of Tax Administrators, the Multistate Tax Commission, the National Conference of State Legislatures and other representatives of state and local governments.

== Publications ==
COST utilizes electronic broadcast email to keep members informed of the most important issues. COST newsletters are distributed to COST members for free on a weekly basis. Those newsletters include:

- COST Conscious – The purpose of COST Conscious is to communicate timely information about COST accomplishments, upcoming activities or services, and membership activities, as well as important technical information on cases, legislation and regulations.
- COST Practitioner Connection – A bi-weekly publication summarizing articles posted by COST Practitioner Connection members (over 80 law, accounting and consulting firms). This publication also includes a listing of upcoming events offered by practitioners.
- Legislative Alert – The primary legislative communication device is COST's Legislative Alert – an email service that highlights the significant business tax proposals at state capitals and the politics and personalities driving them. Many companies rely on the Legislative Alert as a SOX 404 control mechanism.
- Events Outlook – This publication highlights and announces all upcoming COST Regional Meetings, Task Force Meetings, Conferences and Schools.
