= Office of Tax Policy =

The Office of Tax Policy is an agency of the United States Department of the Treasury headed by the Assistant Secretary of the Treasury for Tax Policy.

The Office assists the Secretary in developing and implementing tax policies and programs; provides the official estimates of all Government receipts for the President's budget, fiscal policy decisions, and Treasury cash management decisions; establishes policy criteria reflected in regulations and rulings and guides preparation of them with the Internal Revenue Service to implement and administer the Internal Revenue Code; negotiates tax treaties for the United States and represents the United States in meetings and work of multilateral organizations dealing with tax policy matters; and provides economic and legal policy analysis for domestic and international tax policy decisions.

== Sources ==
Office of Tax Policy website
