= List of allegations of misuse of the Internal Revenue Service =

Internal Revenue Service (IRS) logo

This is a partial list of allegations of misuse of the United States Internal Revenue Service (IRS), which traces its roots to the creation of the Commissioner of Internal Revenue in 1862. Examples of political profiling controversies include cases in which IRS employees or government officials have allegedly used IRS resources to target individuals and groups for espousing or expressing particular political beliefs.

== Roosevelt administration ==
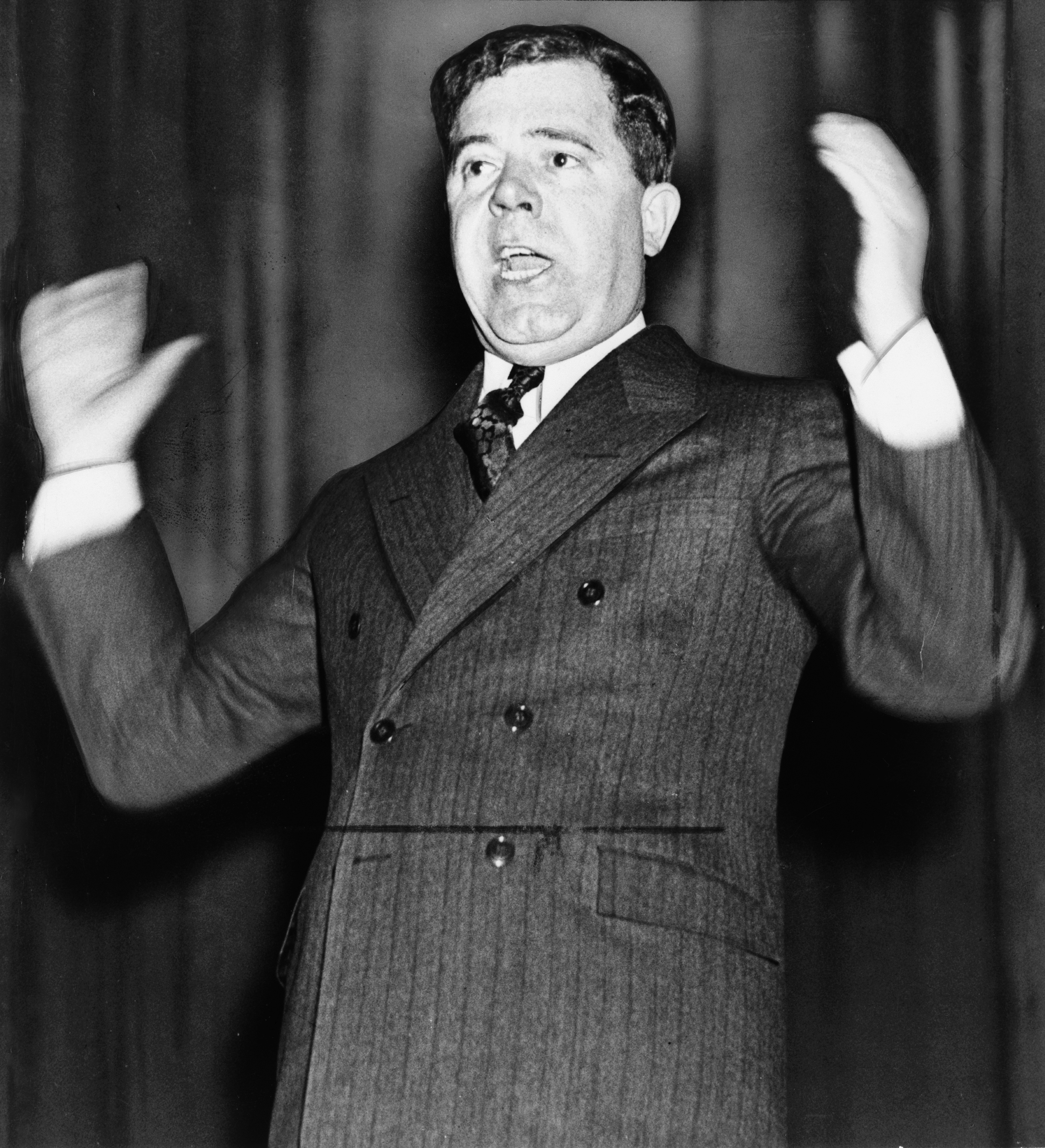
An IRS investigation into Louisiana Governor and Senator Huey Long (pictured) launched by President Franklin D. Roosevelt has been cited as the first example of IRS political targeting.

Use of the IRS for political targeting has been alleged as far back as the Franklin D. Roosevelt administration. To discredit political opponent Huey Long and damage his support base, Roosevelt had Long's finances investigated by the Internal Revenue Service in 1934.

"My father," Elliott Roosevelt observed of his famous parent, "may have been the originator of the concept of employing the IRS as a weapon of political retribution."

== 1940s–1960s ==
The most famous Kennedy administration project allegedly deploying tax-related targeting was called the "Ideological Organizations Project". This was a project which allegedly investigated, intimidated, and challenged the tax-exempt status of right-wing foundations.

Many instances of alleged political profiling were coordinated with the Federal Bureau of Investigation (FBI), sometimes under COINTELPRO. The IRS provided the FBI with free access to tax returns, which the FBI used to investigate groups as ideologically varied as the John Birch Society, the National Association for the Advancement of Colored People, and the American Communist Party.

Beginning in the 1950s and continuing into the 1960s, the IRS audited civil rights leader Martin Luther King Jr. numerous times. In addition to King himself, the Southern Christian Leadership Conference and several of King's lawyers were subjected to audits.

== Nixon administration ==
On 16 July 1969, counselor to the President Arthur F. Burns met with IRS Commissioner Randolph W. Thrower; according to a memo of Thrower's, Burns conveyed that "[t]he President had expressed to him great concern over the fact that tax-exempt funds may be supporting activist groups engaged in stimulating riots both on the campus and within our inner cities." Burns questioned "whether there possibly might be some ideological bias" from the IRS to "the more liberal organizations."

Eight days later the IRS established the Activist Organizations Committee "collect relevant information on organizations predominantly dissident or extremist in nature and on people prominently identified with these organizations." The committee was later renamed the Special Services Staff (SSS); the Committee and the SSS operated out of the Room 3049 in the Internal Revenue Service Building, under "Red Seal Security". Differences emerged between the service and White House over the purpose of the SSS, as the latter pushed for gathering "valuable intelligence-type information" through field audits and curtailing the activities of certain groups through "administrative action." The IRS held that the SSS worked to "provide a greater degree of assurance of maximum compliance with the Internal Revenue laws by those involved in extremist activities and those providing financial support to these activities." At that time the SSS had information on 1,025 groups and 4,300 individuals.

Under executive office pressure the SSS expanded its list of "radicals" to 2,873 organizations and 8,585 individuals with information provided from the Justice Department, FBI, Secret Service, Army intelligence, Airforce intelligence and "sometimes even press clippings." J. Anthony Lukas said "[s]ome 78 per cent of the files were ultimately found to have 'no apparent revenue significance or potential.'" IRS Commissioner Thrower and the White House came into conflict over the appointment of John Caulfield as ATF Director, which Thrower resisted. He refused another push to appoint Caulfield as head of a proposed "quasi-autonomous" enforcement branch of the ATF, which he termed a "personal police force." Thrower continued to rebuff the White House, threatening to resign after a direct order. Later in 1971 he resigned as Commissioner, saying the "introduction of political influence into the IRS would be very damaging to him and his administration, as well as to the revenue system and the general public interest."

The new commissioner Johnnie Mac Walters was bypassed by the "President's men"; Roger Barth who was close to Nixon served as a "back-door channel" in the roles of special assistant to the commissioner and later deputy counsel, while John Caulfield had a 'channel' to assistant commissioner for inspection Vernon Acree. In July 1971, Caulfield was able to obtain a copy of the Brookings Institution's tax returns after the White House "became agitated" over the Institution. Caulfield also called for an audit of Emile De Antonio, producer of the film Millhouse: A White Comedy which satirized Nixon. In October 1971, the newspaper Newsday published an investigate series on one of the President's friends; this led to White House Chief of Staff Bob Haldeman telling Counsel John Dean the senior editor of Newsday "should have some [tax] problems." The White House also "apparently obtained confidential tax information" on journalist James Polk after he had written articles on the President's lawyer, Herb Kalmbach. According to John Dean, President Nixon asked tax issues "be turned off on friends of his," including Billy Graham and John Wayne who had their IRS audits "looked into" by Caulfield.

IRS Commissioner Walters refused the request of John Dean to investigate 490 staffers and contributors to the George McGovern Presidential campaign. Before the 1972 elections Nixon said "We have to do it artfully so that we don't create an issue that we are using the IRS politically. And there ways to do it, goddamnit. Sneak in one of our political appointees." After the election he remarked "I look forward to the time that we have the agents in the Department of Justice and the IRS under our control after November 7."

The SSS was dissolved in August 1973 after the details of its operation became public.

In 1974, a Bill of Impeachment against President Richard Nixon was approved by the House Judiciary Committee that included charges that his administration attempted to use the IRS in a discriminatory manner:

RESOLVED, That Richard M. Nixon, President of the United States, is impeached for high crimes and misdemeanours...
Using the powers of the office of President of the United States, Richard M. Nixon, in violation of his constitutional oath faithfully to execute the office of President of the United States...
He has, acting personally and through his subordinates and agents, endeavoured to... cause, in violation of the constitutional rights of citizens, income tax audits or other income tax investigations to be initiated or conducted in a discriminatory manner.

== Clinton administration ==
Conservative groups, including The Heritage Foundation, the National Rifle Association of America, and Judicial Watch alleged that the Clinton administration subjected them to politically motivated audits.

In September 1992, Paula Jones who had filed a civil lawsuit against Bill Clinton alleging sexual harassment was audited by the IRS and alleged it was politically motivated. Clinton press secretary Mike McCurry denied that the White House had any involvement. Juanita Broaddrick who accused Clinton of raping her was also audited by the IRS and told the New York Post, “I do not think this was a coincidence”. Broaddrick's lawyer Larry Klayman filed a complaint with the inspector general of the Treasury Department.

In May 1993, Clinton's associate White House counsel William H. Kennedy met with FBI agents at the White House, where he asked them to investigate Billy Dale, who had been fired from the White House travel office. The agents hesitated investigating Dale, saying that there was not sufficient evidence to justify an investigation, but they agreed to investigate after Kennedy told them that he would turn to the Internal Revenue Service for help if they didn't investigate. Republican Party opponents of the Clintons alleged that Kennedy pressured the agents. A White House internal review criticized Kennedy's actions.

== Bush administration ==
The NAACP was audited in 2004 after its chairman criticized then-President George W. Bush for failing to address the group, becoming the first president to do so since Herbert Hoover. The IRS informed the NAACP that the audit was prompted by then-NAACP-chairman Julian Bond's speech, which "condemned the administration policies of George W. Bush on education, the economy and the war in Iraq." Although the IRS maintained that the audit was an attempt to determine whether the NAACP had involved itself in a political campaign, the NAACP and Democratic Party representatives characterized the audit as an attempt to stifle criticism of Bush, intimidate NAACP members, and harm the NAACP's get-out-the-vote campaign.

According to the Huffington Post in 2004, the Wall Street Journal reported that the IRS audited the liberal group Greenpeace at the request of Public Interest Watch, a group funded by Exxon-Mobil. Exxon-Mobil said it was not aware of the IRS audit, nor did it have a role in initiating the audit.

According to the Tampa Bay Times PolitiFact the allegation that the IRS during the Bush administration targeted liberal groups is "Mostly False".

== Obama administration ==
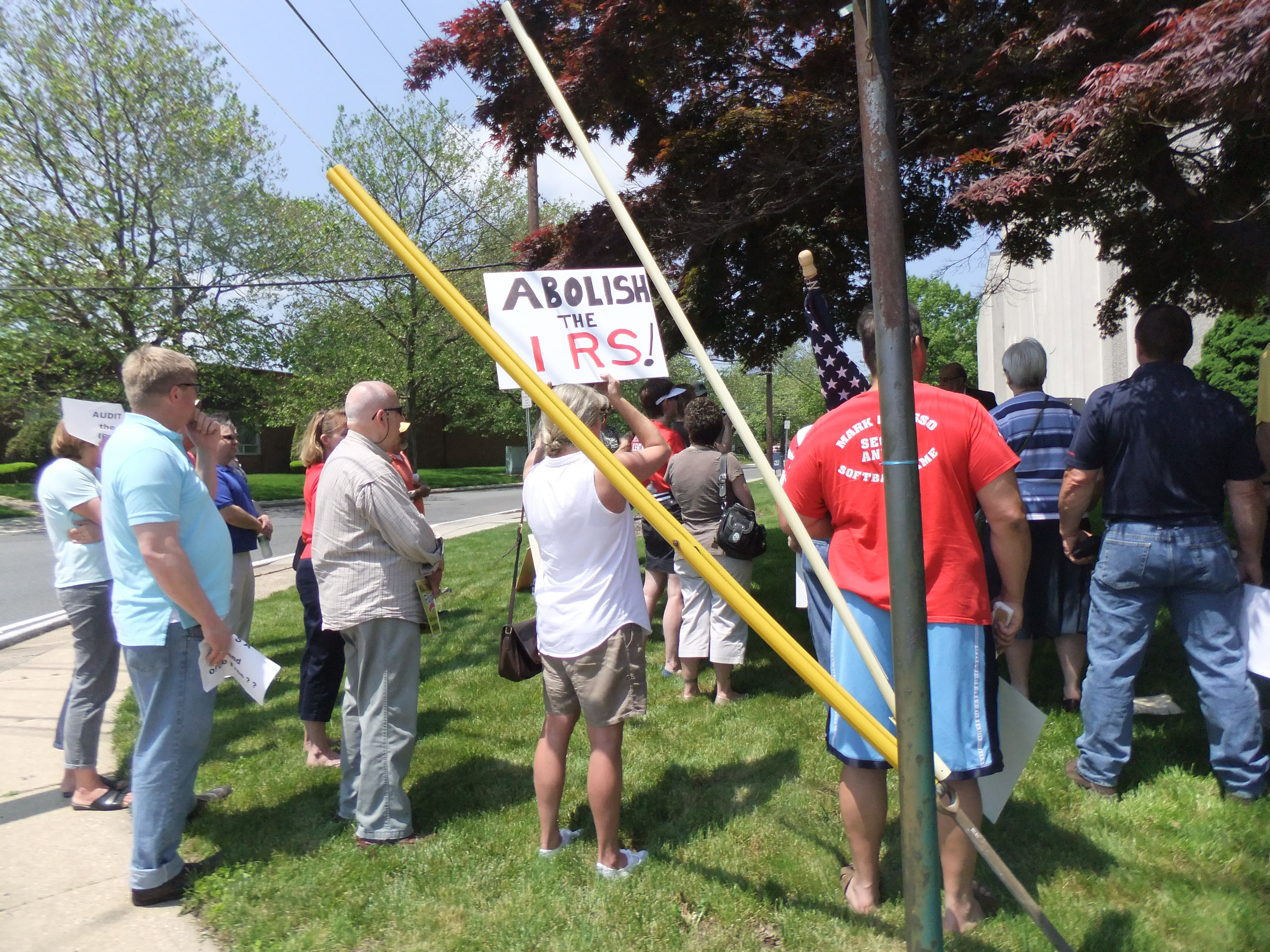
Purported IRS targeting of conservative groups under President Barack Obama led to anti-IRS protests by the Tea Party.

In May 2013, the IRS admitted it had subjected conservative political groups to closer scrutiny in their applications for tax-exempt status based on particular keywords in their names. The agency has maintained that low-level employees took it upon themselves to do this. However, Republicans argue that the refusal of Lois Lerner (at the time was Director of the IRS's Exempt Organizations Unit) to testify before Congress, twice citing her Constitutional right against self-incrimination, suggests involvement by higher-level employees. An internal report by the agency's Inspector General cited "ineffective management" as the cause and indicated that the IRS "will need to do more so that the public has reasonable assurance that applications are processed without unreasonable delay in a fair and impartial manner in the future." Congress continues to investigate the possibility that Lerner or other high-level officials were involved in improper political targeting. Republican lawmakers say the IRS has improperly withheld and destroyed evidence, while Democrats argue that Republicans are attempting to keep the controversy alive for political purposes.

== Trump administration ==
2025 Memorandum of understanding between the Treasury and Department of Homeland Security

Trump v. IRS addendum dated May 19, 2026 and signed by Todd Blanche

James Comey and Andrew McCabe were both audited during the Trump administration. A watchdog group determined these audits were random and the National Research Program (NRP) was used to select tax returns at random to be audited and is working as designed.

In 2025, the IRS agreed to share taxpayer data with the Department of Homeland Security.

In 2026, the IRS was sued by Trump for $10 billion dollars allegedly concerning bias in relation to his tax returns, though most critics perceived it as another attempt of targeting of civil society. It was later settled for another deal between the IRS and DOJ.
