= Donald Alexander (lawyer) =

American lawyer (1921–2009)

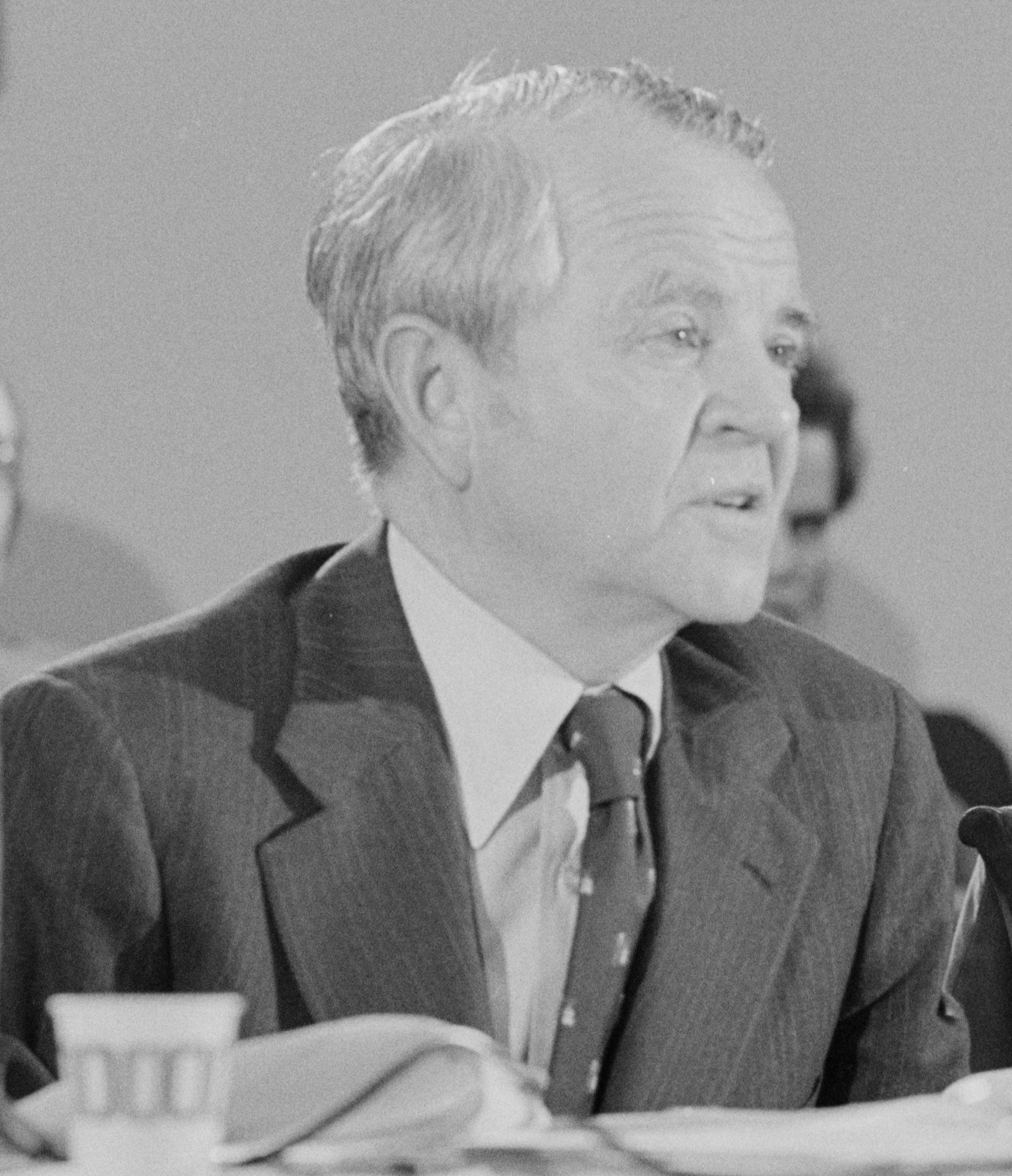
- Alexander in 1976

Commissioner of Internal Revenue
- In office May 25, 1973 – February 26, 1977
- President: Richard Nixon
- Preceded by: Johnnie Mac Walters
- Succeeded by: Jerome Kurtz

Personal details
- Born: Donald Crichton Alexander; May 22, 1921
- Died: February 2, 2009 (aged 87)
- Education: Yale College; Harvard Law School
- Occupation: Tax lawyer

Military service
- Allegiance: United States
- Branch/service: United States Army
- Battles/wars: World War II
- Awards: Bronze Star Medal; Silver Star

Donald Crichton Alexander (May 22, 1921 – February 2, 2009) was an American tax lawyer and Nixon administration official.

== Education and military career ==
Alexander served in the Army in World War II, receiving the Bronze Star and the Silver Star. He graduated from Yale College and Harvard Law School.

== Political career ==
Alexander began his career as a tax lawyer, which included positions at Covington & Burling and Akin Gump, where he worked until he died of cancer.

Alexander was appointed Commissioner of Internal Revenue by President Richard Nixon in May 1973, and was replaced in February 1977, early in the Jimmy Carter administration.

=== Nixon administration and controversy ===
Alexander resisted attempts by Nixon to use the Internal Revenue Service (IRS) to investigate Nixon's political enemies, resulting in a string of attempts by Nixon to fire him. Early on in his tenure as Commissioner, he dismantled the IRS Special Service Staff, which had been used to pursue detractors of the administration and its policies in Vietnam. Alexander ended a special unit of the IRS, the Special Services Staff, which Nixon had created to target activists and political dissidents.

Alexander advocated for stronger tax confidentiality laws.

There exists controversy over how Alexander used his position as IRS Commissioner to attack internal efforts at the IRS at uncovering tax evasion and tax fraud.

Government offices
Preceded by Raymond F. Harless; Acting	Commissioner of Internal Revenue; May 25, 1973 – February 26, 1977	Succeeded by William E. Williams; Acting
