= Shirley Peterson =

Shirley Peterson may refer to:

- Shirley Hardman (born 1928), New Zealand athlete, married name Shirley Peterson
- Shirley D. Peterson, American lawyer
