= Lawrence B. Gibbs =

American attorney

Lawrence Gibbs

41st Commissioner of Internal Revenue
- In office August 4, 1986 – March 4, 1989
- President: Ronald Reagan; George H. W. Bush
- Preceded by: Roscoe L. Egger Jr.
- Succeeded by: Fred T. Goldberg Jr.

Personal details
- Born: August 31, 1938 (age 86); Hutchinson, Kansas, U.S.
- Political party: Republican
- Education: Yale University (BA); University of Texas, Austin (LLB)

Lawrence B. Gibbs (born August 31, 1938) is an American attorney who served as the Commissioner of Internal Revenue from 1986 to 1989.
