= Tax status of Scientology in the United States =

The tax status of the Church of Scientology in the United States has been the subject of decades of controversy and litigation. Although the Church of Scientology was initially partially exempted by the Internal Revenue Service (IRS) from paying federal income tax, its two principal entities in the United States lost this exemption in 1957 and 1968. This action was taken because of concerns that church funds were being used for the private gain of its founder L. Ron Hubbard (according to the IRS) or due to an international psychiatric conspiracy against Scientology (according to Scientology).

In the course of a 37-year dispute with the IRS, the church was reported to have used or planned to employ blackmail, burglary, criminal conspiracy, eavesdropping, espionage, falsification of records, fraud, front groups, harassment, money smuggling, obstruction of audits, political and media campaigns, tax evasion, theft, investigations of individual IRS officials and the instigation of more than 2,500 lawsuits in its efforts to get its tax exemption reinstated. A number of the church's most senior officials, including Hubbard's wife, were eventually convicted and jailed for crimes against the United States government related to the anti-IRS campaign. The IRS, for its part, carried out criminal investigations of the church and its leaders for suspected tax fraud.

Although the church repeatedly lost in court cases heard up to the level of the Supreme Court, it undertook negotiations with the IRS from 1991 to find a settlement. In October 1993, the church and the IRS reached an agreement under which the church discontinued all of its litigation against the IRS and paid $12.5 million to settle a tax debt said to be around a billion dollars. The IRS granted tax exemption to 153 Scientology-related corporate entities with the right to declare subordinate organizations tax-exempt in the future.

The terms and circumstances of the agreement remained secret until details emerged through leaks and litigation beginning in 1997. The terms have attracted controversy for their perceived favorability toward the church, and have been described as unconstitutional by federal courts for their bestowal of privileges on Scientologists shared by no other religious group. Questions have also been raised about whether the IRS exceeded its authority by effectively overruling the Supreme Court in setting the terms of the agreement and permitting tax deductions not authorized in law. Some legal commentators have concluded that the agreement can no longer be effectively challenged in court.

== Early corporate structure ==
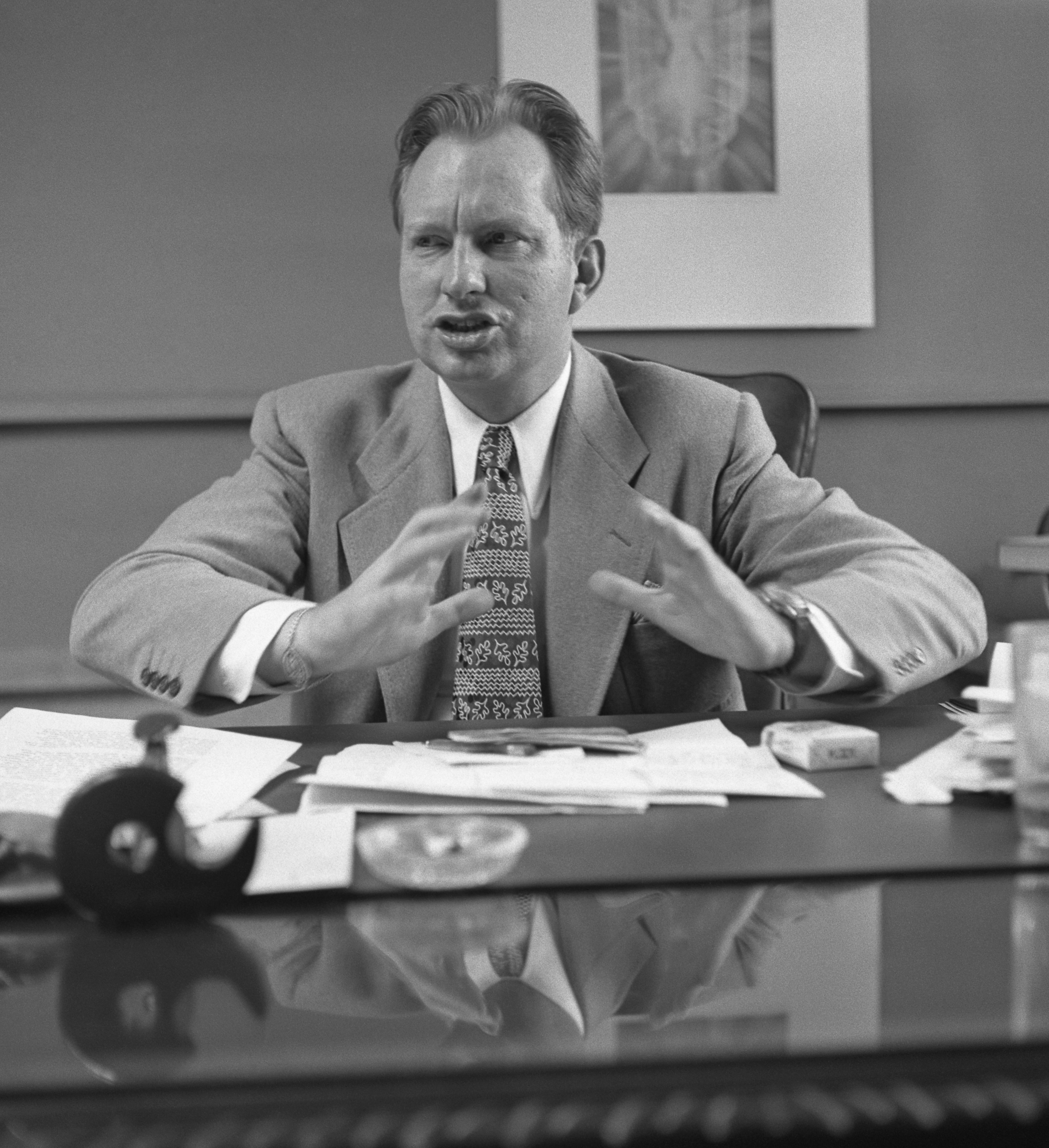
Scientology's founder L. Ron Hubbard in 1950

L. Ron Hubbard initially incorporated Scientology in April 1952 as a for-profit entity called the Hubbard Association of Scientologists (HAS). It was not at first presented as a religion. However, in April 1953 Hubbard wrote to a colleague to canvass her views on pursuing "the religion angle" to improve Scientology's business prospects. Soon afterwards, in December 1953, he incorporated the first Church of Scientology in Camden, New Jersey.

Hubbard made no secret of why he was interested in a religious approach. Jana Daniels, one of Hubbard's early followers, recalled that, among Scientologists, the move to a nominally religious status "was a most unpopular idea until it was explained by Mr. Hubbard that for tax reasons, a church would get a better shake." On February 18, 1954, the Church of Scientology of California was incorporated by Burton Farber, a local Scientologist. It was subordinate to the Church of American Science, an entity headed by Hubbard, to which it paid a twenty percent tithe. A Founding Church of Scientology was also established in Washington, D.C.

The HAS was dissolved the following June, and was replaced by the Hubbard Association of Scientologists International (HASI). Hubbard explained that the intention was to give Scientology "complete security from legal interference" due to "the constitutional guarantees of a Supreme Court ruling that no state shall take action to prevent operation of any organization concerned with the study of the human soul." The HASI would operate as the parent organization which franchised local Scientology churches or "orgs" and received ten percent of their gross income.

== Initial tax exemption and revocation ==
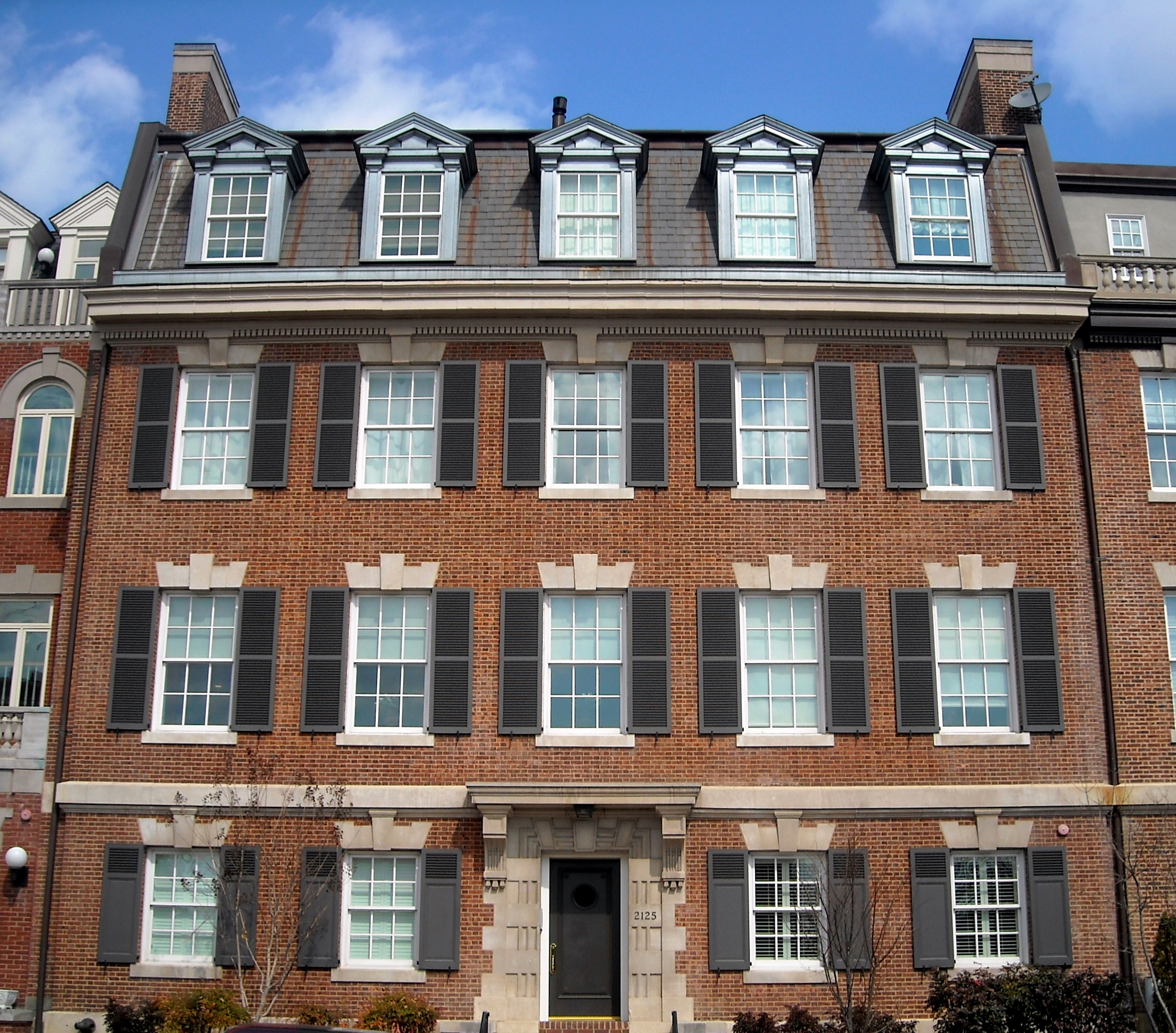
The Founding Church of Scientology in Washington, D.C.

The Internal Revenue Service awarded tax exemption to the California and Washington, D.C. churches in 1956 and 1957 respectively. In 1958, however, the Washington church lost its tax-exempt status on the grounds that its tenets and practices did not constitute an exclusively religious or educational activity. A key factor in the revocation of its exemption was the issue of private inurement – the use of tax-exempt monies to benefit a non-tax-exempt individual or entity. The Court of Claims found that Hubbard and his family had profited from the Washington Church of Scientology. He had been given $108,000 over four years by the church, with the free use of a car and a private residence. His family had withdrawn thousands of dollars from the church's funds, and his wife Mary Sue had earned over $10,000 from renting property to it. Hubbard had also been tithed ten percent of the church's gross income. The church appealed to the US Court of Claims, but lost. The court ruled that Scientology was a "business, a profit-making organization run by Hubbard for his personal enrichment."

In 1959, Hubbard moved to England where he purchased Saint Hill Manor in East Sussex to serve as a family home and world headquarters of Scientology. Over the following seven years, he tried repeatedly to establish a tax-exempt corporate vehicle in the United Kingdom by establishing multiple limited companies under the aegis of various Scientology entities and applying for non-profit status. However, the British Inland Revenue consistently refused the applications.

The Church of Scientology of California (CSC), a fairly minor part of the Scientology corporate structure at the time, had managed to retain its tax exemption. In contrast to the Washington "Founding Church", an IRS audit concluded in 1964 that the CSC was operating for legitimate tax-exempt purposes. The IRS reconfirmed CSC's tax-exempt status. In March 1966, Hubbard took advantage of this action by transferring the HASI's assets in the United States, the Commonwealth and South Africa to the CSC. By transferring Scientology's overseas operations to the control of the CSC, he was able to take advantage of reciprocal tax exemption agreements to ensure that Scientology could operate internationally under the tax-exempt mantle of the CSC.

The Founding Church of Scientology in Washington, D.C. had an ongoing lawsuit against the United States Government for a refund of the federal income taxes that the church had to pay following the loss of its tax exemption in 1957. The Department of Justice asked the IRS to review the tax-exempt status of the CSC and other Scientology entities, believing that the CSC's exemption was inconsistent with the earlier revocation of the Founding Church's exemption. In July 1966, the IRS sent the CSC a letter stating that the IRS proposed to revoke the tax exemption on the grounds that the CSC's income was inuring to the benefit of Scientology practitioners, that CSC was engaged in commercial activities, and that CSC was serving the private interests of L. Ron Hubbard. On July 18, 1967, the IRS officially revoked the CSC's tax exemption with retroactive effect. The Founding Church's case against the government went before the US Court of Claims in July 1969, where it argued that it should be exempted from federal income tax as it was constituted "exclusively for religious purposes." Its argument was rejected, setting the scene for what Scientology's leadership would later characterize as a "war" with the IRS.

The IRS revocation of tax exemption was, however, not total. While the California and Washington Scientology organizations lost their tax exemption over the issue of inurement and their business practices, fourteen other separately incorporated organizations in the United States gained or retained exemption despite similar concerns about their activities. The agency's approach to the other organizations was inconsistent. In a 1972 memorandum on the Church of Scientology of Florida (CSF), the IRS recommended that the CSF exemption should be revoked because it had not established that its funds were being used for charitable purposes. Despite this, no action was taken and the CSF retained its exemption.

== Scientology's views of taxation and the dispute with the IRS ==
Underlying the dispute with the IRS was what a court later called Scientology's "scripturally based hostility to taxation". The hostility is derived to a large degree not from religious belief but from political ideology. For many years, Hubbard expressed strident opposition to Communism, denouncing colleagues to the FBI for supposedly being Communist infiltrators and claiming that the Soviets were trying to obtain his discoveries. In 1955, Hubbard said in a manual on brain-washing that the 1909 Income Tax Law of the United States was a Communist conspiracy, even though the Russian Revolution was in 1917, and in 1956, he wrote that mankind had become so desperate that "he will buy almost any ideology whether it is communism or druidism. He will buy the garbage of Marx and even write it unsuspectingly into the United States Constitution under the heading of 'Income Tax.'"

Soon after the Washington church lost its appeal against the withdrawal of tax exemption, Hubbard issued a bulletin to Scientologists urging them to campaign for radical reform of income tax in the United States on the grounds that the "basic principles of US income tax were taken from Das Kapital and are aimed at destroying capitalism. Unless the US ceases to co-operate with this Red push, Communism could win in America." Income tax was also a symptom of impending fascism, in Hubbard's view; in an undated note issued to Scientologists, he wrote, "It is highly possible that a government only enters upon individual taxation when its ability to produce service for its citizens has dropped below the point of non-existence. A government is justified only so long as it serves the people. A business goes bankrupt when it is not voluntarily contributed to. A government goes Fascist."

In later years, he characterised income tax as an alien mind implant left over from the galactic tyrant Xenu's genocide of billions of beings on Earth 76 million years ago. In a 1968 lecture, he told Scientologists that "the United States just copies income tax", which had been used by Xenu to bring in his victims: "One of the mechanisms they used was to tell them to come in for an income tax investigation." Hubbard said that in the last few thousand years, income tax had been used as a punishment by the alien Marcabian civilization, which "looks an almost exact duplicate, but is worse off than the current U.S. civilization".

The Church of Scientology has never accepted that the IRS's concerns over its finances had any legitimacy. The church argues that what it calls "the IRS campaign" was prompted by a conspiracy instigated by psychiatrists opposed to Scientology. Hubbard told Scientologists in a 1967 tape recording that Scientology's "enemies on this planet are less than twelve men. They are members of the Bank of England and other higher financial circles. They own and control newspaper chains, and they are, oddly enough, directors in all the mental health groups in the world which have sprung up ... [and] they control of course income tax, government finance".

In a similar vein in October 1993, Hubbard's successor David Miscavige gave a speech to the International Association of Scientologists in which he claimed that after failing to crush Scientology in its first few years, "the psychs tuned to the modern day, 20th century inquisitors. The creatures of the night. That's right, the vampires. And not little vampires, but the ones who suck the blood from the whole country and so the villain of this plot came on the scene - the Internal Revenue Service." He said that the IRS's chief counsel had conspired with psychiatrists and arranged for "arbitrary denial of tax exemption to every existing Church of Scientology in the United States". According to Miscavige, it was "an inbred trait of the IRS to hate Scientology and desire its destruction."

== Scientology's war: the 1960s and 1970s ==
=== Tax evasion, money smuggling and inurement ===
At the time that the CSC lost its tax exemption, Scientology faced controversy in multiple countries around the English-speaking world. It had been banned in the Australian states of Victoria and South Australia following a scathing report by a public inquiry. It faced pressure from the media, politicians and mental health professionals which led to further inquiries in Canada, New Zealand, South Africa and the United Kingdom.

Hubbard determined at the end of 1966 that he would leave these problems behind by relocating Scientology's leadership, and himself, aboard a small fleet of ships that would travel around the Mediterranean and eastern Atlantic, out of reach of governments and the media. An elite group of the most committed Scientologists – the Sea Organization, or Sea Org – accompanied Hubbard, crewed the ships and received training in the most advanced levels of Scientology as they were being developed by Hubbard. He resigned as President and Executive Director of the HASI, though this supposed relinquishment of management was a fiction; he continued to issue a stream of executive directives and policy instructions and managed Scientology from his ship via a worldwide telex network.

Financial support for the Sea Org was initially provided by the Hubbard Explorational Company Ltd (HEC). Hubbard held ninety-seven of the hundred issued shares. In late 1966, the Church of Scientology of California began paying $15,000 per month to the HEC, and made a one-off payment of $125,000 to one of Hubbard's Swiss bank accounts. He also ordered every Scientology organization to set up an "LRH Good Will Repayment Account" at its local bank and instructed the CSC to buy Saint Hill Manor from him. By this time, Saint Hill was enormously lucrative, taking in up to £40,000 (equivalent to $110,000 at the time) a week.

The UK-registered HEC was replaced after about 18 months by the Operation and Transport Corporation, Ltd. (OTC). This entity was incorporated in Panama – a well-known tax haven – in February 1968 by Hubbard, his wife and Leon Steinberg, a Sea Org member who served as supercargo aboard one of Hubbard's ships. Immediately after the trio incorporated OTC, they resigned and were replaced by three Sea Org members. Hubbard, however, remained very much in control; he held ninety-eight of the 100 issued shares and the US Court of Claims later found OTC to be a "sham corporation".

The Sea Org had no separate corporate identity, so the activities of the Scientology fleet were carried on through a division of the Church called Flag (for "flagship"), based aboard Hubbard's flagship Apollo. Money was funnelled from the CSC to Flag, which usually relied on cash to pay its bills, with little regard for the law. When the United Kingdom introduced restrictions on currency exports in 1968, Scientologists travelling to join Flag were instructed to smuggle large amounts of cash with them. One Sea Org member, Mary Maren, later recalled: "They gave me about £3,000 in high-denomination notes to take out to the ship. I hid it in my boots." Leon Steinberg, one of OTC's three co-founders, became an adept forger; his creations were dubbed "Steinidocuments" by the Scientologists.

Hubbard himself received huge sums. While ordinary Sea Org members were receiving $10 a week, Hubbard was being paid $15,000 a week (equivalent to $131,692 today) via the HEC and other Scientology entities. When one of his Swiss bank accounts had to be closed in 1970, $1 million in cash was transferred to the Apollo. Mike Goldstein, who was appointed Banking Officer aboard the Apollo, recalled that there "were drawers full of money everywhere and more than a million dollars in the safe, but no proper accounts. We paid for everything in cash and were working with three different currencies – Spanish, Portuguese and Moroccan – and it seemed that if anyone wanted money for something they just asked for it."

Goldstein's role as banking officer was supposed to be the responsibility of OTC, which purportedly delivered banking services to Flag. However, in reality OTC had no offices, officers or employees. Flag's funds were deposited in OTC's Swiss bank accounts, on all of which Hubbard was a signatory. In 1972, Hubbard had $2 million in cash transferred from OTC's accounts to the Apollo, where it was stored in a locked file cabinet to which only his wife Mary Sue had the keys.

Another vehicle for inurement was the United States Churches of Scientology Trust, described by the US Court of Claims in 1984 as "a bogus trust controlled by key church officials" including Hubbard himself as, initially, the sole trustee. It was operational from at least 1970, though it was not put on a legal footing until 1973. Three tax-exempt Scientology organizations in Michigan, Minnesota and New York joined the Washington and California churches in a June 1973 agreement to pay ten percent of their monthly incomes to the trust. Mary Sue Hubbard later replaced her husband as a lifetime trustee with the power to appoint two other trustees for two-year terms. The trust's money was held in Swiss bank accounts for the ostensible purpose of the defense of Scientology, though the US Court of Claims found little evidence that the money was actually used for that purpose.

In addition, Hubbard and his wife were paid directly by the church. The couple's salary payments rose from $20,000 in 1970 to over $115,000 by 1972, and the church also paid for their lodging, food, laundry and medical services. Scientology orgs tithed an additional ten percent of their income to Hubbard.

The torrent of cash being funneled to Hubbard had the ostensible justification of "debt repayments". In 1966, an LRH Finance Committee was established with the aim of determining how much the church supposedly owed him. He told the press that he had "forgiven" a $13 million debt. The Committee appraised the Saint Hill estate as having a "business goodwill" value of £2 million, though Hubbard had purchased it for less than £100,000, and included in the debt personal items of expenditure such as the purchase of a yacht in 1940 – twelve years before Scientology had been founded.

=== Obstruction of the IRS and conspiracy to defraud ===
When the Church of Scientology of California lost its tax exemption, it reverted to the status of a regular taxpayer. The church, however, did not accept its new status. Despite being told that it now needed to file income tax return forms, it continued to file the less informative Annual Information Returns as if it were still a tax-exempt organization. It also withheld payment of the taxes that it owed.

The church adopted a range of obstructionist tactics to make it as difficult as possible for the IRS to carry out audits. Hubbard told Scientologists that he wanted to make the IRS "swim in circles". The church followed his lead by seeking to obstruct the IRS's efforts to audit the CSC's finances. The CSC's accountant, Martin Greenberg, told a meeting of Scientology officials in 1970 that he had purposefully made it difficult for the agency to audit the church. IRS agents were given at least two million documents jumbled up in a random order with the intention, according to Greenberg, of making the IRS's examiner so overwhelmed that he would give up and accept Scientology's version of the facts.

When another Scientology church faced an audit in 1972, Greenberg advised staff to "give the IRS agent a bunch of records in a box in no semblance or order, to place the agent in a dark, small, out-or-the-way room, to refuse to give practical assistance like locating records, and to notify petitioner's Guardian Office immediately of the agent's presence." The scheme proved effective, and a two-year effort by the IRS to audit the church's finances between 1971 and 1973 ended in failure.

The church occasionally resorted to outright forgery. It falsified its own financial records to conceal the role of OTC, including creating fake invoices purporting to show that OTC had provided the CSC with training and consultation services. Further falsification took place in the spring of 1975 when a project was undertaken to falsify financial records aboard the Apollo in anticipation of an IRS audit. This plan, which the US Court of Claims ruled was part of a conspiracy to defraud the United States, was put into effect after church officials grew concerned that the outflow of cash from the CSC to OTC would jeopardise the CSC's tax-exempt status.

Hubbard also considered using a front group, the United Churches of Florida, to "preserve the assets of Scientology" in the event that the church lost its fight with the IRS. He wrote in a 1975 memorandum, "We must be ... prepared ... to go right on operating throughout the U.S. and work until we get a straitjacket on IRS. The ultimate objective of IRS is to knock out all Scientology organizations in the U.S. on the pretext of tax. Thus newly operating under new corporate status that does not connect [with Scientology] is the obvious last-ditch effort."

=== Espionage ===
Mary Sue Hubbard, who directed many of Scientology's espionage operations, pictured in 1957

While the church was fighting the IRS in the courts, it also mounted a sophisticated seven-year campaign of espionage against the agency and numerous other government and business organizations in the US, Canada, UK and other countries. Its methods included burglaries, electronic eavesdropping, infiltration and theft of government documents on a massive scale. The campaign was intended to bolster its effort to regain tax exemption, but ended disastrously for the church when it was exposed and led to the imprisonment of some of its most senior leaders, including Hubbard's wife Mary Sue.

The church's espionage campaign was run by the Guardian Office (GO), a department of the church established by Hubbard in 1966. It took over the mission of the church's short-lived Public Investigation Section to "help LRH [Hubbard] investigate public matters and individuals which seem to impede human liberty so that such matters may be exposed and to furnish intelligence required in guiding the progress of Scientology." He instructed its staff to target critics of Scientology and "start investigating them promptly for FELONIES or worse using own professionals, not outside agencies ... Start feeding lurid, blood sex crime [sic] actual evidence on the attackers to the press." He also ordered his followers to "bring the government and hostile philosophies or societies into a state of complete compliance with the goals of Scientology. This is done by high level ability to control, and in its absence, by low level ability to overwhelm. Introvert such agencies. Control such agencies."

The GO was headed by Mary Sue Hubbard, the "Commodore Staff Guardian" (Hubbard was the "Commodore"), with Jane Kember carrying out day-to-day management as the Guardian World Wide. It employed Scientologist volunteers as agents to help it carry out intelligence operations against its targets. In April 1972 the GO developed a three-pronged strategy to target the IRS. Several intelligence operations were instigated:

- Operation Search and Destroy targeted organizations and individuals providing information to the IRS. The GO would use overt or covert means to obtain information which could be used to discredit them, while avoiding any disclosure of Scientology's involvement. The GO had already obtained information on IRS informants and sought to expand its coverage.
- Operation Random Harvest sought to document criminal activity on the part of the IRS.
- Operation Paris aimed to identify individual IRS officials working on Scientology tax matters and investigate their background and activities. A 'plant' would be recruited to develop social and political contacts with IRS personnel.
- Operation Juicy Clanger targeted tax records of prominent politicians and celebrities. Scientology operatives infiltrated the Los Angeles offices of the IRS and stole confidential files on California's governor Jerry Brown, Los Angeles' mayor Tom Bradley, the singer Frank Sinatra and the actress Doris Day, as well as attempting to steal John Wayne's tax records. The church appears to have intended to blackmail the IRS; the operation envisaged the church pretending that it had received the stolen tax records from a whistleblower and threatening to release them to create what the plans described as "an additional pressure on [the IRS] to finish the audit [of Scientology tax matters] favorably".

A number of other espionage "projects" – subplans of wider operations against the IRS – were also developed:

- Project Horn was a plan to covertly release stolen documents without revealing the thieves' identity. The records of other taxpayers would be stolen and released along with those of the Church of Scientology. A GO operative within the IRS was instructed to steal letterheaded stationery from the agency so that letters could be forged in the name of a non-existent whistleblower supposedly responsible for the leaks.The operative did so and also stole tax records for Bob Jones University and the Unification Church.
- Project Beetle Cleanup called for the theft of "all DC IRS files on LRH, Scientology, etc., in the Intelligence section, OIO [Office of International Operations], and SSS [Special Services Staff]". It ordered the placement of agents in the "required areas or good access developed".
- Project Troy was aimed "to get prediction on future IRS actions" by planting a permanent bugging device in the office of the IRS Chief Counsel. Information acquired by eavesdropping would be used to brief the church's lawyers to mount defensive actions.

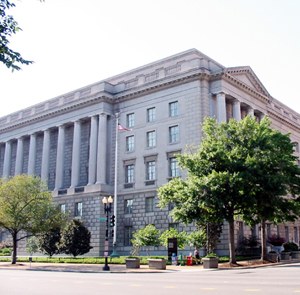
The Internal Revenue Service Building on Constitution Avenue in Washington, D.C., which was infiltrated by Scientology agents in the 1970s

In October 1974 the GO set out a plan – Guardian Order 1361 – to infiltrate IRS offices in Los Angeles, Washington and London, steal files on Scientology and Hubbard and develop a cover story to disguise how the information was obtained. To address a situation that it summarized as the IRS "persisting in its attack upon the C of S and LRH ... despite extensive legal and PR handling", it set out an "ideal scene" envisaging "[the] IRS with no false reports in their files on Scientology, uninterested in Scientology taxes, other than as a routine matter, doing their jobs and busy elsewhere with the usual red tape of a bureaucracy, with the psychotics located and their influence eliminated." It called for the GO to "immediately get an agent into DC IRS to obtain files on LRH, Scientology, etc. in the Chief Council's [sic] office, the Special Services staff, the intelligence division, Audit Division, and any other areas." The agent was to obtain "every single false report in every single IRS file. Once the data has been revealed, the lies can be corrected, the SPs [Suppressive Persons] isolated and handled, further PR and legal actions initiated and the IRS attack turned off."

Scientology operatives broke into the room in the IRS's headquarters building where staff credentials were made and created fake credentials for other operatives to use. The following month, the operatives infiltrated the office of the IRS's Chief Counsel and planted an electronic listening device to eavedrop on a meeting of senior IRS officials dealing with the church's tax affairs. They parked outside in the Smithsonian Institution's driveway and recorded the proceedings via their car's FM radio.

The GO also used the Freedom of Information Act (FOIA) to manipulate the IRS into making it easier for Scientology agents to steal documents. FOIA requests were made to the IRS in the belief that it would result in all of its Scientology files being collated in one place so that IRS attorneys could review them. Scientology agents could then burgle the office where they were being held and obtain them. This plan was successful, and Scientology operatives reported that they had gained access to all of the documents held by the IRS's FOIA attorney. By May 1975, the operatives had stolen more than 30,000 pages of documents, equivalent to a stack of paper ten feet (3.0 m) high, on Scientology and the Hubbards.

A key objective of the GO's campaign was to uncover the individual who Hubbard believed was responsible for the IRS "attack" on Scientology. He told his followers that the IRS's interest in Scientology was due to "an insane individual with insane plans" who was operating a "false reports factory." He ordered the GO in June 1975 to "find the who back of these IRS attacks and document it for exposure plus all other items of interest. It could be IRS and the government is attacking any vocal group to pave the way for some coup by the government. Evidence as to the why of these attacks must be gotten, powerful enough to destroy the attackers when eventually used or revealed."

By the mid-1970s the church's senior leadership had become increasingly concerned that Hubbard himself faced a possible indictment for tax evasion. He wrote a secret minute to the Guardian Office on November 26, 1975 in which he told the GO: "WE COUNT ON YOU GUYS TO MOW THE IRS DOWN AND WIN ACROSS THE BOARDS". A month later, the GO issued Guardian Program Order 158, "Early Warning System", ordering the establishment of a monitoring system "so that any situation concerning governments or courts by reason of suits is known in adequate time to take defensive actions to suddenly raise the level on LRH Personal Security very high". An agent was to be inserted into the IRS Office of International Operations, whose files on L. Ron and Mary Sue Hubbard and the Church of Scientology were to be obtained. At the time, Hubbard was living in seclusion in La Quinta, California to avoid possible process servers and government agents.

The GO initiated a new intelligence program against the IRS codenamed "Off The Hook" in June 1976, intended to get Scientology "off the hook, future threat nullified". It called for continued monitoring of IRS handling of Scientology tax exemption applications "on [Guardian Order] 1361 lines" – i.e. through the use of infiltration and theft of information – and ordered GO operatives to "ensure all attack preparation is completed and honed to razor sharp edge" in the event of any of the applications being denied. A program was also put in place to ensure "Founder's Protection from IRS Attack", requiring the "1361 Collection line" – the burglary team – to keep a close watch on the section of the IRS dealing with Hubbard's tax returns.

On one occasion, the GO's espionage operation was nearly discovered by a cleaning lady who interrupted a burglary team at the IRS headquarters. She became suspicious and called a security guard, but the operatives were able to satisfy him of their credentials and persuaded him to open the locked door of the office they were trying to burgle. They were not so lucky in June 1976 when a more alert security guard caught a GO operative in the building. The operative was released and a warrant was issued for his arrest, prompting the GO to move him to a safe house where he was put under a round-the-clock guard. He lived as a fugitive for eight months until he became so disgruntled by his virtual imprisonment that he escaped and went voluntarily to the FBI to make a confession. A further misfortune befell the GO in July 1977 when a case containing secret documents about its burglaries of IRS offices in Washington was accidentally left in a Los Angeles parking lot. An attorney handed it in to the IRS.

The exposure of the GO's operations led to one of the largest raids conducted by the FBI up to that time. On July 8, 1977, scores of FBI agents simultaneously raided Scientology premises in Washington and Los Angeles. The documents they seized revealed the scale of the GO's illegal activities and resulted in the imprisonment of eleven senior Scientologists, including Mary Sue Hubbard, for conspiracy against the United States.

== IRS investigations of Scientology ==
The Church of Scientology has claimed that it was targeted under President Richard Nixon's enemies list. The claim, however, was false. On the other hand, the IRS did have the Church of Scientology and Hubbard on a "list of organizations it believed were likely to try to evade taxation". A review by the Los Angeles Times in 1978 showed that while the IRS listed the church as an organization that "by their very nature can be expected to ignore or willfully violate tax or firearm statutes", there was no mention of enemies or any suggestion of harassment or retaliation. It was in the context of a drive to consolidate overlapping investigations into groups that the IRS regarded as likely tax evaders.

A number of investigations of Scientology were carried out by the IRS during the 1970s, notably from special intelligence units within the agency. In July 1969 the IRS established an Activist Organization Committee, later renamed the Special Service Staff (SSS), to investigate "dissident groups" for suspected breaches of tax laws. 99 organizations, including the Founding Church of Scientology, were targeted. The SSS was disbanded in 1973.

Another IRS investigative body, the Intelligence Gathering and Retrieval Unit (IGRU), was established in 1973. This was responsible for gathering general intelligence unrelated to investigations of specific allegations. The information it gathered was thus very broad in scope, and often unrelated to the enforcement of tax laws. The CSC was designated a "tax resister"; papers relating to it were held in a file labeled "subversives", which contained materials only about Scientology. The IGRU was disbanded in 1975.

IRS intelligence-gathering against Scientology was also managed in California through the state branch of the agency's Case Development Unit. Two special agents were responsible for gathering intelligence between 1968 and 1974 on CSC's operations and financial affairs.

All three branches took an expansive view of their responsibilities in investigating Scientology. As well as filing reports on the organization's financial activities, they also collected information linking the CSC and other Scientology entities with criminal activities in various countries, including allegations of "homicide, blackmail, guerrilla training, break-ins, drug trafficking and the transportation of illegal firearms".

The IRS considered imposing a 30 percent withholding tax on funds being transferred from the United States to overseas Scientology entities, but acknowledged in a March 1967 memo that this would have little effect on the main beneficiary of the transfers. It noted, "this would net little tax and not reach the real tax target – Hubbard." In 1984, the Los Angeles office of the IRS launched a criminal investigation of Hubbard, prompted by defectors from Scientology alleging that he had skimmed off millions of dollars from church funds. A letter was sent to Hubbard's representatives in September 1985 warning that he faced indictment for tax fraud. David Miscavige and another senior church official, Pat Broeker, were also put under investigation. An IRS official, Marcus Owens, said that thousands of agency staff were involved in the investigations. However, according to other federal officials, the Department of Justice was unwilling to spend money on a prolonged conflict with Scientology. The investigation was called off after Hubbard died in January 1986, as it was regarded as moot by that point. The church was informed by the IRS in November 1987 that no charges would be filed against it, Miscavige or Broeker.

== Scientology's war: the 1980s and 1990s ==
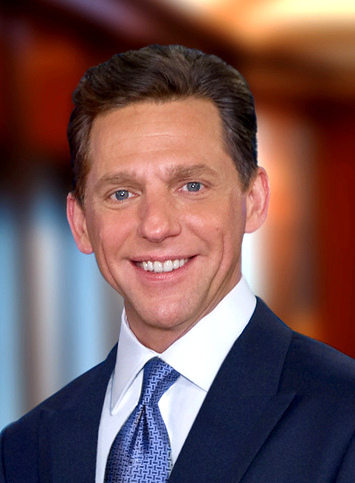
David Miscavige, the current leader of the Church of Scientology

The jailing of the GO's leadership led to radical changes within the Church of Scientology at the start of the 1980s, and in turn to significant changes in the church's strategy towards the IRS. The legal position of the Church and Hubbard himself – who stayed in hiding at a ranch outside Creston, California until his death in January 1986 – was still very precarious. To address this problem, he created an "All Clear Unit" (ACU), headed by David Miscavige, the then twenty-year-old head of the church's Commodore's Messenger Organization (CMO). Its purpose was to resolve all of the outstanding legal problems so that it would be safe for Hubbard to come out of hiding. The ACU removed Mary Sue Hubbard from her post in 1981 and the GO itself was dissolved in 1983. Its functions were transferred to a new section, the Office of Special Affairs (OSA), under the effective control of Miscavige.

One of the lines of activity that came out of the "All Clear" project was a push to resolve the dispute with the IRS. The stakes for the church were extremely high. According to Mark Rathbun, who worked with Miscavige as the church's Inspector-General, by the 1980s the IRS assessed the church's tax liability as upward of a billion dollars, at a time when Scientology's assets were only around $200 million. Paying that liability would have wiped out the church several times over. Beyond the purely financial issues, though, Miscavige and Rathbun believed that tax exemption would have significant political and legal advantages. As Rathbun notes, "If you have tax exemption you have religious recognition, you're treated differently in courts, there's almost some level of First Amendment immunity."

Rathbun was tasked with mounting a campaign intended to overwhelm the IRS on multiple fronts. This involved litigating on a massive scale, establishing front groups, applying political pressure, employing private investigators against individual IRS officials and ultimately reaching a negotiated agreement with the IRS. At the same time, the Church undertook internal changes intended to make it harder for the IRS to have visibility of its finances.

=== Corporate reorganization ===
During the early 1980s, the Church of Scientology underwent a major financial and organizational reshuffle at the same time that it was continuing to funnel huge amounts of money to L. Ron Hubbard. Although he had supposedly resigned from managing the church in 1966 and had no contractual relationship with it, he was still receiving millions of dollars of church money annually. The church's executive director at the time, Bill Franks, said the question was "always how to get more money into Hubbard's pocket and how to hide that from the IRS. There was literally cash all over the place. There would be people leaving from Florida for Europe with bags of cash on a weekly basis. There were hundreds of bank accounts." Forbes magazine reported that up to 1982, at least $200 million had been gathered in Hubbard's name.

To hide Hubbard's connection with the accounts, a shell corporation named the Religious Research Foundation (RRF) was established in Liberia with bank accounts in Luxembourg and Liechtenstein. Franks systematically removed Hubbard's name from the accounts as signatory. He used RRF accounts as an intermediary to channel church money to Hubbard's secret bank accounts in Switzerland and Liechtenstein. By 1981, according to Franks, well over $100 million had been funneled to Hubbard this way. In a single six-month period in 1982, a further $34 million of church money was transferred from the RRF to Hubbard.

The use of the RRF as an intermediary for channelling money to Hubbard was related to a project that the church termed the "Mission Corporate Category Sortout" (MCCS) at the start of the 1980s. According to Laurel Sullivan, a veteran Scientologist who was put in charge of it, the aim was to reshuffle Scientology's corporate structure to shield Hubbard from legal liability and conceal his income lines from the church. Larry Brennan, who oversaw the legal aspects, says that it was additionally intended to give Hubbard and the CMO full legal control over Scientology while "insulat[ing] both Hubbard and the CMO from any legal liability for running the organizations of Scientology by lying about the level of control they really had." Brennan regarded this as fraudulent, but the church's organizational structure was so convoluted that the fraud was almost impossible for outsiders to uncover. At a September 1980 meeting between Scientologist lawyers and church officials, one of the attendees acknowledged in a tape-recorded conversation that the RRF "obviously is the classic case of inurement, if not fraud." The US 9th Circuit Court of Appeals later concluded that "the purpose of the MCCS project was to cover up past criminal wrong-doing [and] involved the discussion and planning of future frauds against the IRS."

The church says the MCCS plans did not go ahead, but a major corporate reorganization took place regardless. The Church of Scientology of California, which had hitherto been the "Mother Church" of Scientology, was turned into little more than a shell corporation. Its assets and responsibilities were split between a series of newly created corporations, notably including the Religious Technology Center, chaired by David Miscavige, and the closely linked Church of Spiritual Technology. The church's franchises were issued with new contracts and told to register as separate corporations under licence to the RTC. This approach was described by Lyman Spurlock, its Corporate Affairs Director, as being "designed to make the whole structure impregnable, especially as regards to the IRS." All Scientology organizations were effectively subordinated to the RTC. Steve Marlowe, the RTC's Inspector General, told Scientologists in a 1982 conference that "you have a new breed of management in the Church. They're tough, they're ruthless.... They don't get muscled around by the IRS or by crazy loonies ... you're playing with the winning team." The church established a new branch called the International Finance Police, managed by an International Finance Dictator, to oversee its financial affairs.

In 1987, an "audit task force" was created by Miscavige to make some sense of the church's tangled finances. Two hundred Scientologists were tasked with going through all the records in Washington and Los Angeles. One of Miscavige's secretaries, Tanja Castle, says that there was "a huge number of people putting together all of this information: binders and pictures, charts ... all the financial records from all the treasuries, all the way down to the lowest org." The task was challenging as the church's financial records were chronically disorganized and full of gaps. According to a Scientologist who served as a church finance officer at the time, "there really were no books. Had anyone from the IRS come in and looked at our finances, they would never have given us any kind of exemption. Some of these orgs hadn't recorded their income, yet their members were claiming on their tax forms that they'd donated tens of thousands of dollars to Scientology, and no one could prove it. They had no records that actually gave you any idea of what a church had, or what it spent – and I'm talking about all of the organizations all over the country."

=== Covert investigations ===
In his 1959 Manual of Justice, Hubbard set out an aggressive approach for dealing with individuals who were seen as enemies of Scientology, writing: "People attack Scientology; I never forget it, always even the score." Enemies of Scientology were to be hounded until they had either been neutralized or were forced to "shudder into silence":

When we need somebody haunted we investigate... When we investigate we do so noisily always. And usually investigation damps out the trouble even when we discover no really pertinent facts ... Intelligence we get with a whisper. Investigation we do with a yell. Always.

— L. Ron Hubbard, Manual of Justice (1959)

Hubbard told his readers: "Of twenty-one persons found attacking Dianetics and Scientology ... eighteen of them under investigation were found to be members of the Communist Party or criminals, usually both. The smell of police or private detectives caused them to fly, to close down, to confess. Hire them and damn the cost when you need to." This playbook was followed against senior officials of the IRS, who were seen as enemies. As Stacy Brooks, then a senior Scientology official, has put it, "What you do with an enemy is you go after them and harass them and intimidate them and try to expose their crimes until they decide to play ball with you."

The church hired private investigators to dig into the personal lives of IRS officials during the late 1980s and early 1990s. One investigator interviewed by The New York Times said the church had offered him $1 million to find evidence of corruption among IRS officials. Another who worked for the church for 18 months said that, among other things, he had set up a fake news bureau, infiltrated IRS conferences, investigated properties owned by IRS officials for possible violations of building codes, surreptitiously obtained internal IRS documents and attempted to seduce a female IRS official. He provided the church with the names and phone numbers of IRS agents that he felt could be blackmailed, had a drinking problem or were suspected of cheating on their spouses. Tenants in apartments owned by IRS officials found private investigators knocking on their doors and making allegations about their landlords.

The campaign put significant pressure on the targeted officials. As one put it, it was "blatant harassment". He had experienced harassment from the Scientologists since the 1970s: "They have a nasty habit of finding your unlisted telephone number and calling you at two A.M., just to let you know they're there." Other IRS officials experienced unusual occurrences. The garden hoses of one assistant commissioner were repeatedly turned on at night by parties unknown, while others found their dogs and cats going missing. Whether or not these incidents were connected with Scientology, they contributed to the sense of menace felt by the agency's senior officials.

The church justified its use of private investigators on the grounds that it needed "to counter lies spread by rogue Government agents". It cited as justification the fact that agents of the IRS Criminal Investigation Division had in turn investigated Scientology. The fruits of the church's investigations were publicized by its fake news bureau and in the pages of the church's Freedom magazine, which it handed out on the steps of the IRS building in Washington. In an internal magazine, it told its members:

This public exposure of criminals within the IRS had the desired effect. The Church of Scientology became known across the country as the only group willing to take on the IRS. And the IRS knew it, It became obvious to them that we weren't about to fold up or fade away. Our attack was impinging on their resources in a major way and our exposés of their crimes were beginning to have serious political reverberations.

— International Scientology News, Issue 32 (1994)

=== Front groups and political pressure ===
Front groups played a high-profile role in the church's campaign to attack the IRS and put it under political pressure. It also mounted a public campaign of its own against the agency. In 1985, the church established a group called the National Coalition of IRS Whistle-Blowers, which it funded for nearly a decade. It was created by Stacy Brooks while she was the managing editor of the church's magazine Freedom. She told the New York Times that the idea was "to create a coalition that was at arm's length from Scientology so that it had more credibility."

The church recruited a retired IRS agent named Paul DesFosses, who left the agency in acrimonious circumstances in 1984, to head the coalition. It provided him with support and investigative assistance to find examples of wrongdoing in the IRS. The coalition's biggest success came in 1989 when its investigations prompted a congressional inquiry into allegations of wrongdoing by IRS staff in Los Angeles. The group claimed to have 5,000 members who were said to be mostly current and former IRS employees. Scientologists affiliated with the coalition demonstrated outside the IRS offices in Washington in 1990 and offered a $10,000 reward for information on "IRS abuses," but attracted little interest.

A second front group was Citizens for an Alternative Tax System (CATS). It was headed by Steven L. Hayes, a prominent Scientologist, to promote L. Ron Hubbard's idea of a national retail sales tax to replace the federal income tax and make the IRS redundant. According to Vic Krohn, a veteran Scientologist and former Guardian Office member who served as the first Executive Director of CATS, it was a project of the church's Office of Special Affairs. It was created by "a special unit dedicated to keeping the churches open under increasing IRS pressure" but its connections with the church had to be deniable. As Krohn puts it, "In order to meet the corporate requirements (IRS provisos making substantial political activity a disqualifying factor for church tax-exempt status) for such blatant political/economic reform activity, CATS needed to operate independently of the church. It was a constant battle to keep CATS activity off of OSA social reform lines." Hayes duly denied that the Church of Scientology had any role in CATS other than helping to establish it, but Krohn says that the church was still directing its affairs as late as 1993.

CATS gained political support from conservatives, claimed to have 3,000 members, and published glossy advertisements paid for by the International Association of Scientologists. However, its ties to Scientology proved toxic for its longer-term success and deterred potential allies. Its proposals were adopted instead by another conservative organization, Americans for Fair Taxation, which campaigned to promote a sales tax "without the taint of Scientologist involvement". CATS's signature proposal was rebranded the "FairTax" and was eventually adopted by prominent Republican politicians including John McCain and Fred Thompson. CATS itself withered after 1993 and by 2005 it was virtually defunct.

The church also mounted an overt political campaign against the IRS. Its magazine Freedom published anti-IRS stories under headlines such as "Speaking Out Against IRS Abuses". It drew on IRS documents obtained through Freedom of Information Act requests to publish numerous stories attacking the agency. In 1990, David Miscavige wrote an op-ed article for USA Today calling for the abolition of the IRS and the introduction of a value added tax to replace income tax. The church spent around $6 million on full-page advertisements in USA Today and The Wall Street Journal castigating the IRS under headlines like "Don't Kill My Daddy!" and singled out individual IRS officials for condemnation.

Scientology operatives were deployed on Capitol Hill to feed anti-IRS information to congressional aides. One former operative says that she had spent over a year working on the Hill to highlight the way that the IRS had handled taxpayers ranging from the Amish to small business owners. Her connection with Scientology was not a secret, but she aimed to "get people to come forward and show that there were attacks on other members of the public, not just on Scientology." The church used IRS documents to argue that it had been unfairly targeted. It made much use of one memorandum from the 1970s documenting a meeting of IRS officials which Rathbun has dubbed the "Final Solution" conference, at which the IRS considered the possibility of changing its definition of a religion to exclude Scientology. Rathbun comments, "We used that [memo] I don't know how many times on them".

Scientology was not without allies in its struggle with the IRS. A ruling against the church in 1980 had supported the agency's contention that it could withhold or revoke tax exemption from a body that violated "public policy," such as civil or criminal statutes. The same principle was upheld by the Supreme Court in 1982 when it revoked the tax exemption of Bob Jones University over that body's policies of racial discrimination. Other religious groups, including the National Council of Churches, lent their support to Scientology over concerns that the IRS's approach could result in religious freedom being curtailed through denying exemption to bodies with which the government disagreed on policy grounds.

=== Religious makeover ===
To buttress its case against the IRS, Scientology underwent what the Los Angeles Times called in a 1990 article a "sweeping religious makeover". Hubbard issued a directive ordering Scientology organizations to display religious paraphernalia such as crosses and copies of the "Creed" of Scientology, hold "Sunday services" and establish chapels in their buildings. He declared: "Visual evidences that Scientology is a religion are mandatory." Scientology auditors, previously known as counselors, were renamed "ministers" and instructed to wear white collars, dark suits and silver crosses. Similarly, customers were renamed "parishioners" and franchises were renamed "missions". The changes were unwelcome for many Scientologists, who were used to an entirely secular environment, and raised worries among staff members that the overt display of religiosity would drive people away. The church also engaged with academics specializing in the study of religion, in an effort to bolster its contention that Scientology was a bona fide religion. A number of religious scholars were courted and given carefully controlled access to church facilities and suitably coached members, and testified on behalf of the church in court.

=== Further litigation ===
In September 1984, the US Tax Court issued a 222-page judgement upholding the IRS's revocation of the CSC's tax exemption. The court rejected the church's claims that it had been unfairly targeted and ruled that Scientology was substantially operated for commercial purposes, that its income inured to L. Ron Hubbard and others, and that the church "had the illegal purpose of conspiring to impede the IRS from collecting taxes due... and, thus, its activities, dictated at the highest level, violated well defined public policy." It drew extensively on the incriminating documents seized by the FBI from the Guardian Office and concluded, "When a religious organization loses track of its charitable mission and conducts its operations for profit or private gain, the reasons for the exemption are dispelled. The organization no longer serves the public benefit." The decision was a disaster for the church, which appealed unsuccessfully to the 9th Circuit Court of Appeals and the Supreme Court.

In the late 1980s, Scientology adopted a new litigation strategy aimed at overwhelming the IRS by suing it on a massive scale. It filed about 200 lawsuits against the agency, challenging its refusal of tax exemption and seeking to obtain documents that would show misconduct by the agency. It also prompted over 2,300 individual Scientologists to sue to demand that the IRS should allow them to make tax deductions for their contributions to the church. One single Scientologist-owned law firm generated nearly 1,200 lawsuits on behalf of Scientologist clients. Characterized by Rathbun as "simple little cookie-cutter suits", many of the lawsuits became fully-fledged legal cases which resulted in court hearings.

The strategy was effectively a kind of litigious denial of service attack, aimed at tying up and exhausting the IRS's legal department. A tax lawyer interviewed by the St. Petersburg Times commented: "It's consumed a fair amount of resources in the exempt organizations [division] over there to deal with them year after year after year." The church had around 100 simultaneous lawsuits ongoing against the IRS by mid-1992. On at least one occasion, the barrage of lawsuits resulted in the IRS's litigation budget running out before the end of the year. Miscavige boasted of the effect that this had on the agency:

And we were also beginning to impinge on government resources. In fact, the attorneys working for the government defending these law suits were to become so inundated that their entire budget would be wiped out handling our cases – so much so that they didn't even have money to attend the annual American Bar Association conference of lawyers – which they were supposed to speak at!

— David Miscavige, speech on October 8, 1993

Many Freedom of Information Act requests were also litigated when initially refused by the IRS. According to a Washington-based attorney, William C. Walsh, who litigated on the church's behalf, "We wanted to get to the bottom of what we felt was discrimination. And we got a lot of documents, evidence that proved it."

The church also sued seventeen individual IRS officials for what it claimed was a 33-year conspiracy against Scientology. The suit, filed in 1991, demanded payment of $120 million in damages. It alleged that the IRS had conducted bogus tax exemption proceedings as a cover for a criminal investigation of Scientology. According to the suit, the IRS's Los Angeles Criminal Investigation Division had used "mail covers, paid informants, summonses to dozens of financial institutions and church members, and infiltration of Scientology's ecclesiastical hierarchy" in pursuit of its investigation.

Another line of litigation concerned tape recordings of Scientology officials and lawyers discussing the Mission Corporate Category Sort-out in 1980. The recordings had come to the attention of the IRS, which saw them as evidence of planned fraud, but the church sought to suppress them as protected by attorney–client privilege. The US 9th Circuit Court of Appeals ruled against the church, finding that "the figures involved in MCCS admit on the tapes that they are attempting to confuse and defraud the U.S. Government" and the recordings were therefore not protected under attorney–client privilege rules. The Supreme Court upheld the court's ruling and established an important legal precedent, that courts could review privileged discussions in camera to determine whether they were caught by the crime-fraud exception to attorney-client privilege.

==== Hernandez and Powell cases ====
The church's litigation over its members' tax deductions focused on the validity of IRS Revenue Ruling 78-189, a 1978 regulation providing that the "fixed donations" demanded by Scientology of its members for auditing and training sessions were not charitable contributions under the Internal Revenue Code. The payments were held to have been made to purchase services as a commercial transaction and were therefore not deductible on Scientologists' income tax returns. This was challenged by numerous Scientologists in various jurisdictions.

While the Tax Court and four appeals courts ruled in favor of the IRS, three other circuits ruled against the agency in separate cases between 1984 and 1988. Several of the cases were consolidated as Hernandez v. Commissioner, which eventually reached the Supreme Court in 1989. The Supreme Court held that the payments were indeed nondeductible. When Congress had passed the relevant legislation, it had not envisaged making quid pro quo payments deductible. Extending this to payments to Scientology would mean that payments to other church-owned institutions for things such as medical care, schooling and counseling could also be considered deductible, which had not been Congress's intention. The Court also sought to avoid the danger of entangling church and state by requiring the IRS to monitor religious activities to determine which payments were for "religious" or "secular" purposes. It ruled that the IRS's approach did not violate the Establishment or Free Exercise Clauses of the First Amendment.

The Hernandez case left unanswered another legal question: as other religious groups could claim deductions for payments to their churches to participate in religious services (for example, Mormon tithing or Protestant "pew rents"), could Scientologists do the same? A case backed by the church, Powell v. United States, was brought by a Florida Scientologist in 1990. Although a district court ruled against the petitioner, an appellate court ruled in 1991 that the case could proceed. However, it was discontinued in late 1993 after the Church of Scientology agreed to discontinue all of its lawsuits against the IRS as part of a settlement agreement.

== Negotiations and the resolution of the dispute ==
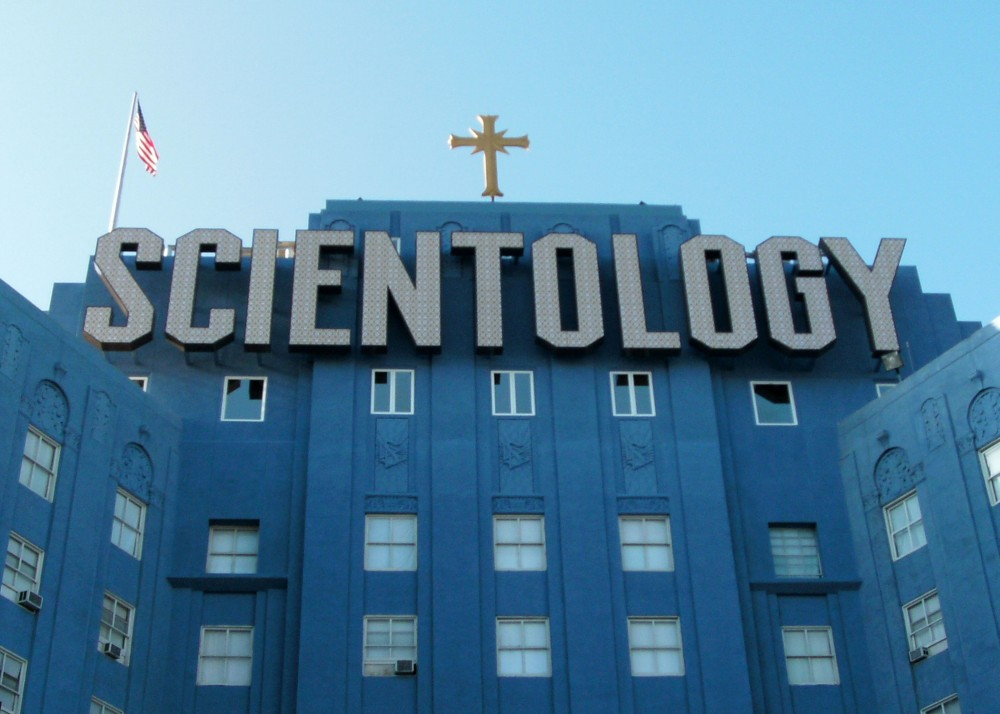
The old Cedars of Lebanon Hospital in Los Angeles, California, formerly the headquarters of the Church of Scientology of California

Even as the dispute between the Church of Scientology and the IRS continued, attempts were made to find a negotiated agreement. Talks in 1977 came close to settling the dispute but foundered on the issues of CSC's record-keeping system, reporting obligations and its involvement in the GO's criminal campaign against the IRS. The "war" finally came to an end after an unusual meeting between Scientology's leader and the then IRS Commissioner, Fred Goldberg. According to the church, David Miscavige and Mark Rathbun, another senior church official, walked into the IRS building in Washington on a whim and requested a meeting with the commissioner. Although some reports claimed that Miscavige and Rathbun held an impromptu meeting with Goldberg that day, according to Rathbun the meeting was held a month later, after the pair had made contact with lower-level IRS officials during their walk-in visit.

Miscavige made an impassioned twenty-minute speech on Scientology's behalf, excusing the church's previous history of criminal activity and vexatious lawsuits against the IRS being as the church "just trying to defend ourselves". He told the commissioner, "We can just turn it off", referring to the lawsuits and personal attacks against IRS officials. Rathbun added, "Like a faucet." At the meeting, Rathbun told Goldberg: "Let's resolve everything. This is insane. It's reached insane levels." Goldberg responded positively and set up a special five-member working group, answering to his deputy commissioner John Burke, to find a solution to the dispute. This was a highly unusual step – only the second time in thirty years that such an approach had been taken, according to the working group's chairman – as it bypassed the usual channels of the IRS's exempt organizations division. Rathbun characterized this as being necessary to exclude the "Scientology haters" from the review process.

Over the next two years, Miscavige, Rathbun, the working group's members and Scientology tax lawyers met on a regular basis to work through the issues that stood in the way of an agreement. Rathbun recalls, "We pretty much commuted to D.C. – a couple times a month for the next year, preparing and bringing boxes and boxes of documentation to answer all of the questions the IRS had." A pressing concern for the church was the potential requirement to publicly disclose information about its financial dealings. The IRS agreed that it would keep secret most of the information that the church was providing. This was itself an unusual concession, and a sign, in the view of some IRS officials, that an agreement was preordained. Paul Streckfus, a former IRS official, suggests that "[o]nce the IRS decided to set up this rather extraordinary group, the wheels were in motion for a deal." However, it may not have been as simple as that. A year into the process, Rathbun says,

Miscavige was becoming extremely impatient with the process. He used every carrot and stick method he knew to overwhelm the D/Commissioner to grant exemption. We spent hundreds of thousands of dollars to gather intelligence to flank all of this. We even received information from credible sources from the White House. And by near the end of the 1992 we were hearing that Papa Bush himself – exercising his trademark indecision – was concerned about the effect granting exemption to the Church of Scientology would have on his re-election hopes.

— Marty Rathbun

Although Goldberg had initiated the negotiations, he left the IRS in February 1992. Two other commissioners served over the subsequent 15 months. Rathbun says that the stalled process suddenly began moving again after the Bill Clinton administration took office, with a new Clinton-appointed commissioner, Margaret Milner Richardson, heading the IRS from May 1993. It is unclear whether or how Richardson was involved with the negotiations, although as Commissioner she would normally have to approve any large settlement.

The IRS sought to resolve three key issues: had those involved in the church's criminal campaign against the US Government in the 1970s been purged? Was the church's money being used exclusively for tax exempt purposes? And following the death of L. Ron Hubbard, were any private individuals or entities profiting from church income and assets? Church representatives say they provided answers that satisfied the IRS in what was reportedly the largest application ever received by the agency, filling a collection of files 10 to 12 feet (3.0 to 3.7 metres) long. However, the working group's tax analysts noted in writing that they were ordered by their chairman not to consider any substantive matters, such as whether the church was engaged in too much commercial activity or whether its leaders were obtaining undue private benefit. The chairman, Howard M. Schoenfeld, later acknowledged that this was an unusual move.

Rathbun says that in September 1993 the two sides began exchanging settlement drafts and tax exemption was granted in the first week of October. The agreement was announced on October 13, 1993. In contrast to agreements with two other religious organizations – the Jimmy Swaggart Ministries and Jerry Falwell's Old Time Gospel Hour – the IRS refused to make public any of the agreement's terms or how much the Church of Scientology had paid in back taxes. It was not until December 30, 1997 that the terms of the agreement became public when they were leaked to The Wall Street Journal. The source of the leak (which was made to both The Wall Street Journal and The New York Times) was never disclosed but it possibly came from Capitol Hill, where a congressional committee had recently subpoenaed numerous IRS documents.

=== Terms of the agreement ===
The agreement between Scientology and the IRS comprises a 76-page document, known as a "closing agreement", which sets out the commitments and obligations of both sides. The IRS says of such agreements, quoting US Treasury Regulations, that they "may be entered into in any case in which there appears to be an advantage in having the case permanently and conclusively closed, or if good and sufficient reasons are shown by the taxpayer for desiring a closing agreement and it is determined by the Commissioner that the United States will sustain no disadvantage through consummation of such an agreement."

Under the agreement, the Church and the IRS agreed the following key terms of settlement:

- The Church paid $12.5 million to cover its payroll, income and estate-tax bills for an undisclosed period prior to 1993.
- All of the church's lawsuits against the IRS were dropped, and it would no longer assist any people or groups bringing lawsuits against the agency over claims prior to the settlement date of October 1, 1993.
- An undisclosed sum of payroll taxes, penalties, liens and levies assessed against church entities and officials, including Miscavige, was dropped by the IRS.
- The IRS also dropped its audits of thirteen Scientology organizations and agreed not to audit the church for any year prior to 1993, as well as ending litigation against the church.
- The church agreed to establish a Church Tax-Compliance Committee, headed by Miscavige, that comprised "the largest United States Church entities, as well as those individuals who are the highest ecclesiastical or corporate authorities within the Church". The CTCC was responsible for overseeing the new arrangements during a seven-year transition period, reporting annually to the IRS on the application of the agreement and guaranteeing the collection of taxes owed during the first three years. The individual members of the CTCC could be fined up to $75,000 each if they failed to provide reports as agreed. If the IRS found that they were spending church funds on noncharitable purposes, the entities responsible could be fined up to $50 million. This penalty was lifted with effect from 1999.

The IRS granted 153 "Scientology-related entities" in the United States tax exemption. As well as the Religious Technology Center and the Church of Scientology International, the "mother church", they included organizations such as Narconon and Applied Scholastics that usually claim to be secular and separate from Scientology. They even included two publishing houses, Bridge Publications and Author Services Inc., that published Hubbard's wholly non-religious science fiction books.

The IRS also gave the church the right to extend the tax exemption to future branches, effectively giving the church the ability to grant itself further tax exemptions and to decide which of its activities did not need to be taxed. The agency agreed to send foreign governments a "Description of the Scientology Religion", written by the church but printed under an IRS letterhead, to inform them that the US government had found Scientology to be "organized and operated exclusively for religious and charitable purposes."

In conjunction with the agreement, a limited amount of information about church finances was released, including details of the salaries of Miscavige and other high-ranking church officials, and the disclosure that the church was making about $300 million annually from a variety of sources.

=== Reaction to the agreement ===
Miscavige greeted the agreement with public jubilation. He awarded Rathbun the title of "Kha-Khan", a distinction devised by Hubbard to recognize a "particularly brave deed", in acknowledgement of Rathbun's role as "the guy who got us tax exemption". On October 8, 1993, he announced the agreement to an audience of over 10,000 Scientologists from around the world gathered in the Los Angeles Sports Arena. He told them:

There will be no billion dollar tax bill which we can't pay. There will be no more discrimination. There will be no more 2,500 cases against parishioners across the US. The pipeline of IRS false reports won't keep flowing across the planet. There will be no more nothing - because ... THE WAR IS OVER!

— David Miscavige

At this point, as Rolling Stone's Janet Reitman puts it, "The band launched into triumphant music and the audience rose to their feet, screaming and cheering as the words "THE WAR IS OVER!" flashed on giant screens behind Miscavige's head." Miscavige went on to tell the audience, "The power of our group is greater than you can imagine ... What exactly does this mean? My answer is: everything. The magnitude of this is greater than you can imagine ... The future is ours." Behind the scenes, though, the stress of the negotiations had taken a physical and emotional toll on both Miscavige and Rathbun. According to Lawrence Wright, Miscavige attempted to strangle his stage manager at the Sports Arena when the visual effects went wrong during rehearsals for his speech. Miscavige was furious when the media highlighted his $100,000 salary and contrasted it to the $30 a week paid to most Scientology staff members. A month later, an exhausted Rathbun temporarily defected from Scientology; he left permanently in 2004.

IRS officials outside of the small working group that had negotiated the agreement expressed shock, puzzlement and dismay. The official line within the agency was that the dispute had tied up its resources for far too long and needed to be resolved. However, as was noted at the time, the IRS had won in all of the substantial cases brought against it by the church. The officials who had been dealing with Scientology's tax affairs were confident that they would ultimately win, not least because the IRS had successfully defended its position in court only a few months before the agreement was signed. Lawrence B. Gibbs, the previous IRS Commissioner, noted the extensive litigation with "the general uniformity of results that the service had with Scientology" and expressed surprise that the ultimate decision was favorable. Some speculated that the church's harassment campaign had prompted the agency to cave. A formerly high-ranking IRS official told Janet Reitman, "If you ask me, [Fred] Goldberg couldn't put up with the harassment like the rest of us did." Robert Fink, a New York tax lawyer who reviewed the leaked agreement for The Wall Street Journal, noted that the IRS "normally settles on tax issues alone. What the IRS wanted was to buy peace from the Scientologists. You never see the IRS wanting to buy peace."

The IRS threw a veil of secrecy over the terms of the agreement, citing taxpayer privacy laws and refusing Freedom of Information Act requests for documents relating to it. While other religious organizations had been required to disclose the payment of back taxes, Scientology was not. Gibbs implicitly criticized the secrecy, saying that it was "even more surprising that the service made the decision without full disclosure, in light of the prior background."

Rathbun insists that the church's tax exemption was earned legitimately and that its tactics were within the law. In his account of how the negotiations stalled until the election of Bill Clinton, he suggests that the agreement was personally backed by the new president. He says that around 1995, the Scientologist actress Anne Archer met Clinton during a White House tour:

Ann thanked Clinton for his administration having granted tax exemption to her church. Clinton told Archer a little story as to why he considered it was the right thing to do. Clinton said that in the sixties when he was pursuing his Rhodes scholarship at Oxford, he hung with a fraternity of Yale University graduates. He said that a couple of the members of that fraternity were Scientologists. He said he never forgot how kind and spiritual they both were. He knew then and there – by the beingnesses and conduct of those Scientologists – that Scientology was a spiritual activity and that "Scientologists were good people."

— Marty Rathbun

The agreement was covered in the press when it was announced, but due to the secrecy that surrounded its terms, it was "a one-day story" at the time. It prompted Doug Frantz, a journalist with The New York Times, to take a closer look at rumours that a private investigator working for Scientology had gone after IRS officials. Frantz unearthed the investigator and found other leads, eventually leading to an interview with Scientology officials that he says "remains the most difficult interview I've ever had." His story detailing the church's tactics against the IRS was eventually published on March 9, 1997, sparking further controversy about the agreement. When the text of the agreement was leaked a few months later, Miscavige complained that its publication by The Wall Street Journal constituted "a felony".

=== Litigation and legal debate related to the agreement ===
The agreement led to years of further litigation and legal debate. Unsuccessful attempts were made to force the IRS to release the terms of the agreement, prior to it being leaked to The Wall Street Journal. There was also litigation about whether members of other religions could avail themselves of the tax exemptions given to the Church of Scientology. The courts determined that they could not, and that there were serious Establishment Clause concerns about the agreement granting unique privileges to Scientologists. The agreement's terms were judged to be unconstitutional but were not overturned or extended to non-Scientologists. Questions were also raised about whether the IRS had exceeded its powers in granting the exemption after the Supreme Court's decision in the 1989 Hernandez case and whether the law allowed quid pro quo payments to be tax-deductible.

==== Tax Analysts v. Internal Revenue Service ====
In November 1993, only a month after the announcement of the agreement, the non-profit tax transparency organization Tax Analysts (TA) made a Freedom of Information Act request to the IRS to obtain the closing agreement. The IRS refused, prompting a lawsuit by TA.

The case focused on the IRS's obligations under the Internal Revenue Code (IRC). While the IRS had refused to release information about the agreement on the grounds that returns and return information are deemed confidential, TA argued that the closing agreement should be released under a different section of the IRC that allowed for the public disclosure of information submitted to the IRS by tax-exempt organizations. In court, the IRS rejected this argument and claimed that the closing agreement did not serve as the basis for the rulings granting tax exemption to Scientology. The litigation brought out many previously undisclosed details of how the IRS had handled the negotiations with the church, but did not succeed in forcing the agency to disclose the terms of the agreement.

==== Sklar v. Commissioner of Internal Revenue ====
After the agreement was leaked, a New York Orthodox Jewish couple, Michael and Martha Sklar, sought to avail themselves of the exemption granted to Scientologists to deduct eighty percent of the fees paid for "religious training and services". They made similar deductions for the early 1990s without being challenged by the IRS, but were denied deductions for 1994 and after. The Sklars sued the IRS in 1997 to resolve the matter.

The centrality of the agreement to the Sklars' case led them to subpoena the document from the IRS and the Church of Scientology. The IRS refused and the subpoenas were quashed by a tax court. The agency argued that the agreement needed to be kept secret as it was "private taxpayer business of another taxpayer", and refused to corroborate any of its reported details. As neither the IRS nor the church would admit to the veracity of the leaked text of the agreement, the court was unable to enter it as evidence. The Court of Appeals for the 9th Circuit ruled against the Sklars, but said that "it appears to be true" that Scientology was receiving uniquely favorable tax benefits, in contravention of the First Amendment. Judge Barry D. Silverman asked in his opinion, "Why is Scientology training different from all other religious training?", and took the unusual step of recommending further litigation to clarify the issue:

If the IRS does, in fact, give preferential treatment to members of the Church of Scientology—allowing them a special right to claim deductions that are contrary to law and rightly disallowed to everybody else—then the proper course of action is a lawsuit to stop that policy. The remedy is not to require the IRS to let others claim the improper deduction, too.

Sklar brought a fresh lawsuit in 2001 to resolve the First Amendment question. The IRS defended its position, saying that case law was clear that religious school tuition was not tax-deductible, and allowing it generally would lead to millions of people claiming tax refunds. Sklar lost again at trial but received an initially more favorable response from the 9th Circuit Court of Appeal. Judge Kim Wardlaw said that the bottom line of the IRS's position was that the agency believed that "it can unconstitutionally violate the Constitution by establishing religion, by treating one religion more favorably than other religions in terms of what is allowed as deductions, and there can never be any judicial review of that." Ultimately, however, the court upheld the IRS's position that the situation of the Sklars was dissimilar to that of the Scientologists. Religious tuition was held to be different from Scientology auditing. Judge Wardlaw wrote in the court's decision, "We ... conclude that tuition and fee payments to schools that provide secular and religious education as part of one curriculum are quite different from payments to organizations that provide exclusively religious services." The court took the same view on the Scientology–IRS agreement's constitutionality as its predecessor in the 1997 case, concluding that extending an unconstitutional tax concession to others would be an unacceptable further violation of the Establishment Clause.

Legal observers noted that the outcome of the two Sklar cases, combined with recent changes in the doctrine of standing, meant that the Scientology–IRS agreement was now effectively unchallengeable in court. The right of ordinary taxpayers to challenge the IRS in such cases was removed by a Supreme Court decision in 2007. Josh Gerstein, who covered the case for the New York Sun, comments: "It now looks like the alleged unconstitutionality of the Scientologists' tax deal may be one of those government actions which cannot be remedied in the courts."

==== Questions over IRS powers ====
The agreement was criticized by four former Commissioners of the IRS, Jerome Kurtz, Don Alexander, Laurence Gibbs and Sheldon Cohen. Kurtz and his colleagues wrote in May 1994 to the then Commissioner, Margaret Milner Richardson, to "express serious concern about the failure of the Internal Revenue Service to comment on or explain the meaning of several aspects of its settlement with the Church of Scientology". They questioned the IRS's decision to allow tax deductions for quid pro quo payments, despite the outcome of the Hernandez case, and argued that it cannot ignore the Supreme Court's Hernandez ruling without further explanation. As Cohen put it, "the facts involving the Scientology auditing payments must have changed before the IRS could justifiably ignore Hernandez".

Alison H. Eaton suggests that the IRS's decision to effectively overrule the Supreme Court was motivated by the fear of defeat in the Powell case. If it had lost, it would have faced a choice between denying Scientologists tax deductions given to other religious groups, or allowing the deductions that the Supreme Court had disallowed in Hernandez. The latter may have been seen as the lesser of two evils. However, it has given rise to a serious constitutional problem: granting the deductions now means that Scientologists are the only religious group permitted to deduct taxes for quid pro quo payments to their church, which can be seen as unconstitutional favoritism.

Eaton argues that the IRS's decision to permit deductions for Scientologists exceeded its statutory authority. The Supreme Court found that the law did not permit quid pro quo payments of the kind made by Scientologists. The IRS's 1993 regulation allowing the deductions was therefore "manifestly contrary to the statute". If the regulation were to be challenged, Eaton suggests, a reviewing court would likely come to the same conclusion as the Supreme Court and disallow the deductions. However, there appears to be little likelihood of the issue coming before a court as taxpayers do not have standing to challenge the regulation.

== Calls to revoke tax exemption ==
Since the Church of Scientology gained tax exemption in 1993, there have been a number of high-profile calls for the IRS to review and potentially revoke the exemption. The calls have generally focused on the question of whether the church is operating for legitimate tax-exempt purposes.

In 2011, the St. Petersburg Times published a series of articles highlighting what it called "Scientology's money machine" and the tactics used by the church to raise money. It argued that the church "never should have been granted tax-exempt status, and the IRS should revisit that decision. Short of that, there is more than enough public information available to justify an IRS audit to determine if a reasonable amount of proceeds are spent for tax-exempt purposes."

Alex Gibney, the Oscar-winning director of the film Going Clear: Scientology and the Prison of Belief, accused Scientology in 2015 of abusing its tax exemption status by harassing its critics. He highlighted alleged illegal activities carried out by the church and its use of its assets for the private benefit of David Miscavige and Tom Cruise. Writing in the Los Angeles Times, he commented that "it is hard to see why Americans should subsidize Scientology through its tax-exemption."

The actress Leah Remini, who spent many years in Scientology before leaving in 2013, said in a January 2017 interview that she would campaign for the church's tax exemption to be revoked. Remini also produced a series for A&E, Leah Remini: Scientology and the Aftermath, that includes interviews by Remini and Mike Rinder with numerous people who were in the inside circle of Scientology who report the physical, mental, and emotional abuse they and others suffered in the organization.

== See also ==
- List of Scientology organizations
- Scientology front groups
- Scientology controversies
