= List of centenarians (jurists and practitioners of law) =

The following is a list of centenarians – specifically, people who became famous as jurists and practitioners of law – known for reasons other than their longevity. For more lists, see lists of centenarians.

Living

Name	Lifespan	Age	Reason for Notability
Smilja Avramov	1918–2018	100	Serbian academic, authority and educator in international law
Sampson Salter Blowers	1742–1842	100	Canadian defence attorney representing the soldiers accused after the Boston Massacre
William Augustus Bootle	1902–2005	102	American attorney and District Judge of the Middle District of Georgia
Marie-Thérèse Bourquin	1916–2018	102	Belgian lawyer
Wesley E. Brown	1907–2012	104	American district court judge
Joseph Burke	1888–1990	101	American judge
Melville Henry Cane	1879–1980	100	American lawyer and poet
Jean Murrell Capers	1913–2017	104	American educator, judge and politician
Frank Chuman	1917–2022	105	American lawyer and author
Ena Collymore-Woodstock	1917–2025	108	Jamaican barrister and magistrate.
Arnold Wilson Cowen	1905–2007	101	American lawyer and judge
Thomas Simpson Crawford	1875–1976	100	Australian lawyer and politician
Tom Denning, Baron Denning	1899–1999	100	English Master of the Rolls
Edgar Fay	1908–2009	101	British judge
Ben Ferencz	1920–2023	103	Hungarian-Romanian-born American lawyer and last Nuremberg War Crimes tribunal prosecutor
Werner Flume	1908–2009	100	German jurist, legal historian, and professor
John Gabbert	1909–2013	104	American judge
Maurice Gaffney	1916–2016	100	Irish barrister
William George	1865–1967	101	Welsh lawyer
Samuel Hazard Gillespie Jr.	1910–2011	100	American counsel
I. Leo Glasser	1924–	102	American judge
Nico Gunzburg	1882–1984	101	Belgian lawyer and criminologist
Trevor Henry	1902–2007	105	New Zealand justice on the Supreme Court of New Zealand
Oliver Hill	1907–2007	100	American lawyer and civil rights activist
Henry Hu	1920–2025	105	Hong Kong barrister
V. R. Krishna Iyer	1914–2014	100	Indian judge and minister
Charles Wycliffe Joiner	1916–2017	101	American judge
Irving Kanarek	1920–2020	100	American defence attorney representing Charles Manson and "The Onion Field" killer
Alan King-Hamilton	1904–2010	105	British judge
George N. Leighton	1912–2018	105	American judge
Rush Limbaugh Sr.	1891–1996	104	American lawyer and grandfather of Rush Limbaugh
Wilmer W. MacElree	1859–1960	100	American lawyer and author
Ludwig Martin	1909–2010	100	German lawyer and Attorney General
Sir Anthony Mason	1925–2026	100	Australian jurist, chief justice (1987–1995), judge of the Supreme Court of New South Wales (1969–1972) and the High Court (1972–1987)
Harold Medina	1888–1990	102	American lawyer, teacher and judge
Frederick M. Nicholas	1920–2025	105	American lawyer
Karl Plutus	1904–2010	106	Estonian jurist
L. Welch Pogue	1899–2003	103	American aviation attorney
Jack Pope	1913–2017	103	American judge, attorney, author and legal scholar; Chief Justice of the Supreme Court of Texas
Richard Rohmer	1924–	102	Canadian lawyer and aviator
Simone Rozès	1920–	106	French judge
Cesare Ruperto	1925–2026	100	Italian jurist; president of the Constitutional Court of Italy
Carlos P. Scovil	1804–1904	100	American assemblyman, New York state senator and county judge
Donald Seawell	1912–2015	103	American lawyer
Sir Hartley Shawcross	1902–2003	101	British barrister and politician; lead British prosecutor at the Nuremberg Trials
Randolph W. Thrower	1913–2014	100	American attorney
Arthur L. Thurlow	1913–2020	107	Canadian judge and politician
Lawrence Walsh	1912–2014	102	American lawyer; 4th United States Deputy Attorney General
Marion Yorck von Wartenburg	1904–2007	102	German lawyer, jurist, judge, World War II resistance fighter and author
Roland Weyl	1919–2021	102	French lawyer and French Resistance militant
Samuel Williston	1861–1963	101	American lawyer and law professor
Joseph William Woodrough	1873–1977	104	American judge
Knut Söderwall	1874–1980	105	Justice of the Supreme Administrative Court of Sweden (1923–1943).
Alice Yotopoulos-Marangopoulos	1916/1917–2018	101	Greek lawyer and criminologist
