= David H. Blair =

American government official

David Hunt Blair
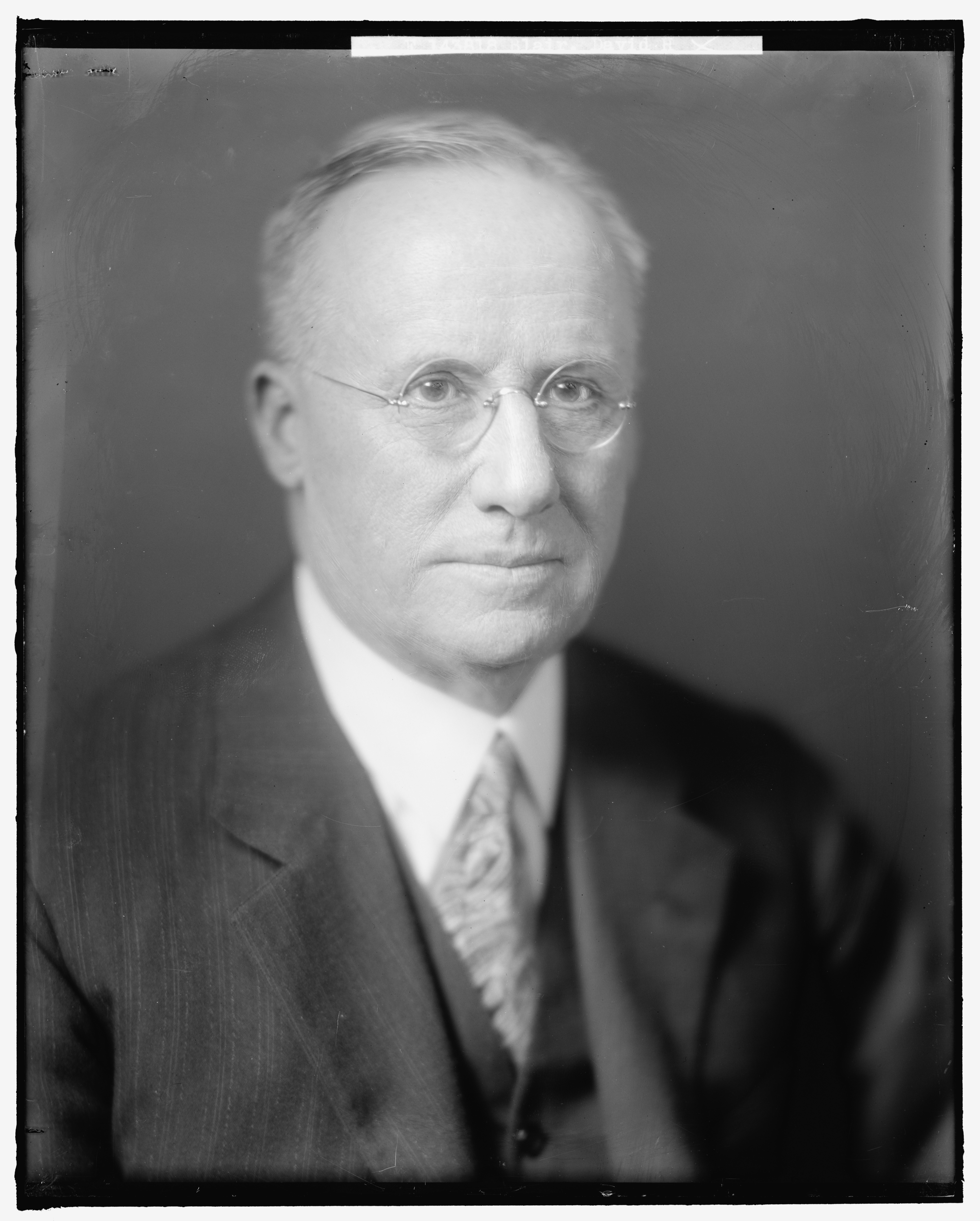

23rd Commissioner of Internal Revenue
- In office May 27, 1921 – May 31, 1929
- President: Warren G. Harding; Calvin Coolidge; Herbert Hoover
- Preceded by: William M. Williams
- Succeeded by: Robert H. Lucas

Personal details
- Born: January 13, 1868 High Point, North Carolina, U.S.
- Died: September 13, 1945 (aged 77)

David Hunt Blair (January 13, 1868 – September 13, 1945) served as Commissioner of Internal Revenue from 1921–1929.

Blair was associated with Col. Francis Henry Fries the President of Wachovia Bank previous to his appointment as Commissioner of Internal Revenue.

Blair was born in High Point, North Carolina. He was selected by United States Secretary of the Treasury Andrew Mellon, who thought that as a teetotaller from a strongly pro-prohibition region of North Carolina, Blair would be the best individual to help enforce the Eighteenth Amendment.

However, Blair was criticized for asserting in a speech that every bootlegger should be stood before a wall and shot to death. He was also criticized for issuing a leaflet urging all citizens to spy on their neighbors and to use telephones outside their neighborhoods to report Prohibition offenders anonymously. On the other hand, many "drys" (proponents of Prohibition) criticized him for allegedly hampering his enforcement officers by requiring them to follow the law and verify that alleged bootleg beverages were actually alcoholic before seizing them and taking other legal actions.

Blair was a delegate to the 1924 Republican National Convention from North Carolina.

== Sources ==
- IRS list of commissioners
- "Prohibition enforcement", report by Blair and Lincoln C. Andrews to Congress, 1927.
- Political Graveyard entry

Party political offices
Preceded by Jacob F. Newell	Republican nominee for Attorney General of North Carolina; 1912	Succeeded by John J. Parker
Government offices
Preceded by Millard F. West	Commissioner of Internal Revenue; May 27, 1921 – May 31, 1929	Succeeded by Robert H. Lucas
