= Sheldon S. Cohen =

American lawyer

Sheldon Cohen
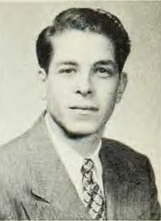

35th Commissioner of Internal Revenue
- In office January 25, 1965 – January 20, 1969
- President: Lyndon B. Johnson
- Preceded by: Mortimer Caplin
- Succeeded by: Randolph W. Thrower

Personal details
- Born: Sheldon Stanley Cohen; June 28, 1927; Washington, D.C., U.S.
- Died: September 4, 2018 (aged 91); Chevy Chase, Maryland, U.S.
- Political party: Democratic
- Education: George Washington University (LLB)

Sheldon Stanley Cohen (June 28, 1927 – September 4, 2018) was an American attorney who served as the Commissioner of Internal Revenue from 1965 to 1969.

== Background ==
Cohen was born in Washington, D.C., the son of a Lithuanian immigrant. He went to the District of Columbia public schools and served in the United States Navy during World War II. He received his law degree from the George Washington University Law School and practiced law in Washington, D.C. He was involved with the Democratic Party and served as the general counsel to the Democratic National Committee.

== Commissioner of the IRS ==
In 1965 Cohen became the youngest ever Commissioner of Internal Revenue. He helped the IRS become fully computerized. Writing in 1968, John Brooks described him as "a man with close-cropped brown hair, candid eyes, and a guileless manner" who was "less gregarious and more reflective" than his predecessor Mortimer Caplin.

== Death ==
He died of heart failure on September 4, 2018, in Chevy Chase, Maryland at age 91.
