= Fred T. Goldberg Jr. =

American tax lawyer

Fred Goldberg

Commissioner of Internal Revenue
- In office July 5, 1989 – February 2, 1992
- President: George H. W. Bush
- Preceded by: Michael Murphy
- Succeeded by: Shirley D. Peterson

Personal details
- Born: October 15, 1947 (age 79) St. Louis
- Education: Yale University (BA, JD)

Fred T. Goldberg Jr. (born October 15, 1947) is an American tax lawyer who has held high-ranking positions in the United States government, including the positions of Chief Counsel of the IRS, Commissioner of Internal Revenue, and Assistant Secretary of the Treasury for Tax Policy. Outside of government, he has had a distinguished legal career in private practice and has been active in tax policy initiatives. His career is marked by major contributions to tax administration, including reforms to improve taxpayer services and efforts to modernize the IRS.

== Career ==
Goldberg graduated from Yale University with a bachelor's degree in 1969. After obtaining his B.A., he was a special assistant at the Office of Economic Opportunity. In 1971, he accepted a position as an assistant dean for Yale's Calhoun College and was an instructor in political science and economics at Yale. He held these positions until 1973, when he completed his juris doctor degree at Yale Law School.

After completing his J.D., was hired as an associate with the firm Latham, Watkins, and Hills. He was named as a partner in the firm in 1981. He worked with the firm until 1984.

From 1982 to 1986, Goldberg worked at the Internal Revenue Service (IRS):

- Assistant to the commissioner of the Internal Revenue Service (1981–1982)
- Acting director of the Legislation and Regulations Division, Office of the Chief Counsel, Internal Revenue Service (1982)
- Chief counsel for the Internal Revenue Service (1984–1986)

In 1989, Goldberg was selected to be the commissioner of the IRS. He held that position until 1992, when he was chosen as assistant secretary for tax policy in the United States Department of the Treasury. He currently resides in Bethesda, Maryland, with his family and is a partner in the office of Skadden, Arps, Slate, Meagher & Flom.

=== Career accolades ===
In September 2022, Goldberg was named to the Washingtonian's 2022 Top Lawyers Hall of Fame.

=== Interactions with Scientology ===
It was under Goldberg's administration that the long running legal conflict over the Church of Scientology's tax status ended, though it took two years (under two other commissioners) to work out the details. Allegedly, following a sustained campaign of legal harassment against IRS officials, David Miscavige and other church leaders arrived at Goldberg's office without an appointment one day to petition for relief. Following the meeting, Goldberg agreed to establish a special five-member working group that bypassed the IRS's normal exempt organizations division — an arrangement that Scientology official Mark Rathbun later said was deliberately structured to exclude what he called “Scientology haters” from the review process. Ultimately, Scientology received a unique tax exemption in 1993, which the IRS subsequently refused to release.

Some former IRS officials subsequently questioned whether the church's harassment campaign had influenced Goldberg's decision to negotiate; his predecessor Lawrence B. Gibbs expressed surprise at the outcome given the IRS's consistent success in prior litigation, and one unnamed senior IRS official told journalist Janet Reitman that Goldberg “couldn’t put up with the harassment like the rest of us did”. Goldberg himself has declined to comment, citing taxpayer privacy laws.
