= Lawrence Walsh =

American judge (1912–2014)

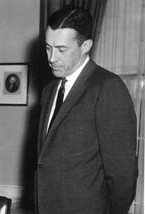

5th United States Deputy Attorney General
- In office December 29, 1957 – January 20, 1961
- President: Dwight D. Eisenhower
- Preceded by: William P. Rogers
- Succeeded by: Byron White

Judge of the United States District Court for the Southern District of New York
- In office April 28, 1954 – December 29, 1957
- Appointed by: Dwight D. Eisenhower
- Preceded by: Seat established
- Succeeded by: Lloyd Francis MacMahon

Personal details
- Born: Lawrence Edward Walsh; January 8, 1912 Port Maitland, Nova Scotia, Canada
- Died: March 19, 2014 (aged 102) Oklahoma City, Oklahoma, U.S.
- Party: Republican
- Spouse: Mary Walsh (m.1936)
- Children: 5
- Education: Columbia University (AB, LLB)

Lawrence Edward Walsh (January 8, 1912 – March 19, 2014) was an American lawyer and judge who was United States Deputy Attorney General from 1957 to 1961 and a judge of the United States District Court for the Southern District of New York. He was appointed Independent Counsel in December 1986 to investigate the Iran–Contra affair during the Reagan administration.

== Early life and career ==
Walsh was born in Port Maitland, Nova Scotia, Canada, the son of Cornelius Edward (1879–1927) and Lila May (Sanders) Walsh. His father was a family doctor and his grandfather was a sea captain. Walsh grew up in Queens, New York, and became a naturalized citizen at the age of 10. He graduated from Flushing High School.

Walsh received his undergraduate degree from Columbia University in 1932 and a law degree from Columbia Law School in 1935. After graduating from law school, he served a varied career in public life, including as special assistant attorney general of Drukman Investigation from 1936 to 1938 and as a deputy assistant district attorney of New York County from 1938 to 1941. After a period in private practice of law in New York City from 1941 to 1943, he served as assistant counsel to New York Governor Thomas E. Dewey from 1943 to 1949 and as Counsel to the Governor from 1950 to 1951. He was a Counsel for the Public Service Commission from 1951 to 1953, and the general counsel and Executive Director of the Waterfront Commission of New York Harbor from 1953 to 1954.

== Federal judicial service ==
Walsh was nominated by President Dwight D. Eisenhower on April 6, 1954, to the United States District Court for the Southern District of New York, to a new seat authorized by 68 Stat. 8. He was confirmed by the United States Senate on April 27, 1954, and received his commission the next day. His service terminated on December 29, 1957, due to his resignation, having served only three and one-half years as a judge.

== Later career ==
After his resignation from the federal bench, Walsh served as Deputy Attorney General in the Eisenhower administration from 1957 to 1960. Thereafter, Walsh resumed the private practice of law in New York City, where he practiced from 1961 to 1981 as a partner at Davis Polk & Wardwell. During this period, he worked on the Bendectin litigation and represented companies such as General Motors and AT&T. In 1969, on the recommendation of his former boss, Secretary of State and former Attorney General William P. Rogers, Walsh was named as an ambassador in the United States Delegation to the Paris Peace Talks in 1969, but held the position for only a short period of time. He served as president of the American Bar Association from 1975 until 1976. In 1981, approaching Davis Polk's mandatory retirement age, Walsh moved his practice to his wife's hometown of Oklahoma City, Oklahoma, where he joined the firm of Crowe & Dunlevy.

== Independent Counsel ==
On December 19, 1986, Walsh was named as the independent counsel in charge of the Iran-Contra investigation. His investigation led to the convictions of both former Assistant to the President for National Security Affairs Vice Admiral John Poindexter and former NSC staffer Lieutenant Colonel Oliver North, though both convictions were subsequently reversed. Walsh also brought an indictment on two counts of perjury and one count of obstruction of justice against former Secretary of Defense Caspar Weinberger in June 1992. That September, one count, obstruction of justice, was dismissed.

On the eve of the 1992 presidential election, on October 30, Walsh obtained a grand jury re-indictment of Weinberger on one count of false statements. One phrase in that superseding indictment referred to President George H. W. Bush. Some believe that Bush had been closing the gap with Bill Clinton, and that this event stopped his momentum. Clinton administration attorney Lanny Davis called the decision to indict a week before the election rather than after the election "bizarre." Judge Thomas F. Hogan dismissed the October indictment two months later for being outside the statute of limitations. Weinberger's subsequent pardon by President George H. W. Bush in December 1992 preempted any trial. Walsh steadfastly denied that the investigation was politically motivated, while Bush and others criticized it as "the criminalization of policy differences."

Walsh submitted his final report on August 4, 1993, and later wrote an account of his experiences as counsel, Firewall: The Iran-Contra Conspiracy and Cover-Up. In 2003, Walsh published his autobiography, The Gift of Insecurity: A Lawyer's Life.

Walsh was the model for the hero of Jacob Appel's novel, The Biology of Luck (2013). Walsh described having a fictional character based upon him as "flattering" during an August 2013 interview.

== Personal life and death ==
In his senior year of college, Walsh began to date Maxine Winton of Tampa, Florida, a former Barnard College student then attending Columbia Business School. They were married from 1936 until her death from cancer, at age 52, in 1964. In 1965, Walsh married Mary Alma Porter; they were married until her death on December 22, 2012. He was the father of five children — Barbara, Janet, Dale, Sara and Elizabeth.

On January 8, 2012, Walsh celebrated his 100th birthday. On March 19, 2014, Walsh died at the age of 102 in Oklahoma City.

== See also ==
- List of centenarians (jurists and practitioners of law)

== Sources ==
- Final Report of the Independent Counsel for Iran/Contra Matters
- Walsh, Lawrence (1997). Firewall: The Iran-Contra Conspiracy and Cover-Up. W. W. Norton & Company. ISBN 0-393-04034-8.
- Walsh, a Democrat who often served under Republicans, is no stranger to controversy.
- Appearances on C-SPAN

Legal offices
New seat	Judge of the United States District Court for the Southern District of New York; 1954–1957	Succeeded by Lloyd Francis MacMahon
Preceded by William P. Rogers	United States Deputy Attorney General; 1957–1961	Succeeded by Byron White
