= Commissioner of Internal Revenue =

Government official that leads the US Internal Revenue Service

- Logo of the IRS
- Incumbent; Vacant since March 6, 2026
- United States Internal Revenue Service
- Style: Commissioner
- Reports to: Secretary of the Treasury
- Seat: Internal Revenue Service Building; 1111 Constitution Ave., NW; Washington, D.C.
- Appointer: President of the United States; with Senate advice and consent
- Term length: 5 years
- Constituting instrument: 26 U.S.C. § 7803
- Precursor: Scott Bessent (acting)
- Formation: 1862
- First holder: George S. Boutwell
- Website: www.irs.gov

The commissioner of internal revenue is the head of the Internal Revenue Service (IRS), an agency within the United States Department of the Treasury.

The office of commissioner was created by Congress as part of the Revenue Act of 1862. Section 7803 of the Internal Revenue Code provides for the appointment of a commissioner of Internal Revenue to administer and supervise the execution and application of the internal revenue laws. The commissioner is appointed by the president of the United States, with the consent of the U.S. Senate, for a five-year term.

On December 4, 2024, President-elect Donald Trump announced his intention to nominate Billy Long to serve as the commissioner of the IRS. He was confirmed by the Senate on June 12, 2025 and sworn in on June 16. President Trump subsequently removed Long as commissioner on August 8, 2025 and announced that Treasury Secretary Scott Bessent would serve as acting commissioner. Bessent was the seventh commissioner of internal revenue to serve in 2025. On March 6, 2026, Bessent's term expired, and the office became vacant.

In November 2025, Frank Bisignano was appointed without Senate confirmation as "Chief Executive Officer of the Internal Revenue Service", a new position understood by tax policy experts, members of Congress, and journalists to be a functional replacement for the commissioner, which would be in violation of statute and the Appointments Clause.

== Responsibilities ==
The commissioner's duties include administering, managing, conducting, directing, and supervising "the execution and application of the internal revenue laws or related statutes and tax conventions to which the United States is a party" and advising the president on the appointment and removal of a chief counsel of the IRS. Treasury Order 150-10 states in relevant part: "The Commissioner of Internal Revenue shall be responsible for the administration and enforcement of the Internal Revenue laws." The commissioner reports to the secretary of the treasury through the deputy secretary of the treasury.

One of the commissioner's most important responsibilities with respect to the internal revenue laws is setting the Treasury Regulations administered by the IRS. The U.S. Treasury Regulations provide (in part):

(a) Issuance. --The Commissioner, with the approval of the United States Secretary of the Treasury, or his delegate, shall prescribe all needful rules and all rules and regulations as may be necessary by reason of any alteration of law in relation to internal revenue.

However, the general counsel of the Department of the Treasury has "the authority to approve all regulations pertaining to the internal revenue laws, including the authority to ratify and approve, where necessary, any such regulations previously issued."

== List of commissioners ==
The following lists commissioners of internal revenue, in chronological order:

No.	Image	Name	Term start	Term end	Refs.
1		George S. Boutwell	July 17, 1862	March 4, 1863	
Acting		Joseph J. Lewis	March 5, 1863	March 17, 1863	
2		Joseph J. Lewis	March 18, 1863	June 30, 1865	
3		William Orton	July 1, 1865	October 31, 1865	
4		Edward A. Rollins	November 1, 1865	March 10, 1869	
5		Columbus Delano	March 11, 1869	October 31, 1870	
Acting		John Watkinson Douglass	November 1, 1870	January 2, 1871	
6		Alfred Pleasonton	January 3, 1871	August 8, 1871	
7		John Watkinson Douglass	August 9, 1871	May 14, 1875	
8		Daniel D. Pratt	May 15, 1875	August 1, 1876	
9		Green B. Raum	August 2, 1876	April 30, 1883	
Acting		Henry C. Rogers	May 1, 1883	May 10, 1883	
Acting		John Jay Knox	May 11, 1883	May 20, 1883	
10		Walter Evans	May 21, 1883	March 19, 1885	
11		Joseph S. Miller	March 20, 1885	March 20, 1889	
12		John W. Mason	March 21, 1889	April 18, 1893	
13		Joseph S. Miller	April 19, 1893	November 26, 1896	
14		William St. John Forman	November 27, 1896	December 31, 1897	
15		Nathan B. Scott	January 1, 1898	February 28, 1899	
16		George W. Wilson	March 1, 1899	November 27, 1900	
Acting		Robert Williams Jr.	November 28, 1900	December 19, 1900	
17		John W. Yerkes	December 20, 1900	April 30, 1907	
Acting		Henry C. Rogers	May 1, 1907	June 4, 1907	
18		John G. Capers	June 5, 1907	August 31, 1909	
19		Royal E. Cabell	September 1, 1909	April 27, 1913	
20		William H. Osborn	April 28, 1913	September 25, 1917	
21		Daniel Calhoun Roper	September 26, 1917	March 31, 1920	
22		William M. Williams	April 1, 1920	April 11, 1921	
Acting		Millard F. West	April 12, 1921	May 26, 1921	
23		David H. Blair	May 27, 1921	May 31, 1929	
24		Robert H. Lucas	June 1, 1929	August 15, 1930	
Acting		H. F. Mires	August 16, 1930	August 19, 1930	
25		David Burnet	August 20, 1930	May 15, 1933	
Acting		Pressly R. Baldridge	May 16, 1933	June 5, 1933	
26		Guy T. Helvering	June 6, 1933	October 8, 1943	
27		Robert E. Hannegan	October 9, 1943	January 22, 1944	
Acting		Harold N. Graves	January 23, 1944	February 29, 1944	
28		Joseph D. Nunan Jr.	March 1, 1944	June 30, 1947	
29		George J. Schoeneman	July 1, 1947	July 31, 1951	
30		John B. Dunlap	August 1, 1951	November 18, 1952	
Acting		John Stephens Graham	November 19, 1952	January 19, 1953	
Acting		Justin F. Winkle	January 20, 1953	February 3, 1953	
31		T. Coleman Andrews	February 4, 1953	October 31, 1955	
Acting		O. Gordon Delk	November 1, 1955	December 4, 1955	
32		Russell C. Harrington	December 5, 1955	September 30, 1958	
Acting		O. Gordon Delk	October 1, 1958	November 4, 1958	
33		Dana Latham	November 5, 1958	January 20, 1961	
Acting		Charles I. Fox	January 21, 1961	February 6, 1961	
34		Mortimer Caplin	February 7, 1961	July 10, 1964	
Acting		Bernard M. Harding	July 11, 1964	January 24, 1965	
35		Sheldon S. Cohen	January 25, 1965	January 20, 1969	
Acting		William H. Smith	January 21, 1969	March 31, 1969	
36		Randolph W. Thrower	April 1, 1969	June 22, 1971	
Acting		Harold T. Swartz	June 23, 1971	August 5, 1971	
37		Johnnie Mac Walters	August 6, 1971	April 30, 1973	
Acting		Raymond F. Harless	May 1, 1973	May 25, 1973	
38		Donald C. Alexander	May 25, 1973	February 26, 1977	
Acting		William E. Williams	February 27, 1977	May 4, 1977	
39		Jerome Kurtz	May 5, 1977	October 31, 1980	
Acting		William E. Williams	November 1, 1980	March 13, 1981	
40		Roscoe L. Egger Jr.	March 14, 1981	April 30, 1986	
Acting		James I. Owens	May 1, 1986	August 3, 1986	
41		Lawrence B. Gibbs	August 4, 1986	March 4, 1989	
Acting		Michael J. Murphy	March 5, 1989	July 4, 1989	
42		Fred T. Goldberg Jr.	July 5, 1989	February 2, 1992	
43		Shirley D. Peterson	February 3, 1992	January 20, 1993	
Acting		Michael P. Dolan	January 21, 1993	May 26, 1993	
44		Margaret Milner Richardson	May 27, 1993	May 31, 1997	
Acting		Michael P. Dolan	June 1, 1997	November 12, 1997	
45		Charles O. Rossotti	November 13, 1997	November 6, 2002	
Acting		Bob Wenzel	November 7, 2002	April 30, 2003	
46		Mark W. Everson	May 1, 2003	May 4, 2007	
Acting		Kevin M. Brown	May 5, 2007	September 9, 2007	
Acting		Linda E. Stiff	September 10, 2007	March 24, 2008	
47		Douglas H. Shulman	March 24, 2008	November 9, 2012	
Acting		Steven T. Miller	November 10, 2012	May 22, 2013	
Acting		Daniel Werfel	May 22, 2013	December 23, 2013	
48		John Koskinen	December 23, 2013	November 12, 2017	
Acting		David Kautter	November 13, 2017	October 1, 2018	
49		Charles Rettig	October 1, 2018	November 12, 2022	
Acting		Doug O'Donnell	November 13, 2022	March 13, 2023	
50		Daniel Werfel	March 13, 2023	January 20, 2025	
Acting		Doug O'Donnell	January 20, 2025	February 28, 2025	
Acting		Melanie Krause	February 28, 2025	April 16, 2025	
Acting		Gary Shapley	April 16, 2025	April 18, 2025	
Acting		Michael Faulkender	April 18, 2025	June 16, 2025	
51		Billy Long	June 16, 2025	August 8, 2025	
Acting		Scott Bessent	August 8, 2025	March 6, 2026	
Vacant			March 6, 2026		
