= Shirley D. Peterson =

American lawyer, businesswoman and academic administrator

Shirley D. Peterson is an American lawyer, businesswoman and former college president. In 1992, she became the first female Commissioner of Internal Revenue, or commissioner of the Internal Revenue Service.

== Biography ==
=== Early life ===
She graduated from Bryn Mawr College and received a J.D. from the New York University School of Law.

=== Career ===
She joined the law firm of Steptoe & Johnson in 1969, and was a partner from 1979 to 1989, and from 1993 to 1994. In 1989, she was appointed by President George H. W. Bush as Assistant Attorney General in the Tax Division of the United States Department of Justice, and from 1992 to 1993, she served as Commissioner of the Internal Revenue Service. In 1990, she argued the United States Supreme Court case Davis v. United States. She sat on the Board of Trustees of the National Legal Center for the Public Interest.

From 1995 to 2000, she served as President of Hood College in Frederick, Maryland. She sat on the Board of Trustees of her alma mater, Bryn Mawr College, from 1994 to 2007, and she is currently a Trustee Emerita. She has served as Chair of the Commission on Government and Public Affairs of the American Council on Education.

She sits on the Boards of Directors of the Goodyear Tire and Rubber Company (since 2004), AK Steel Holding (since 2004) and Wolverine World Wide. She has served on the boards of Champion Enterprises (2004-2010), DWS Mutual Funds (1995-2008), Federal-Mogul (2002-2007), and Bethlehem Steel.

Government offices
Preceded by Fred T. Goldberg, Jr.	Commissioner of Internal Revenue; February 3, 1992 – January 20, 1993	Succeeded by Michael P. Dolan; Acting
