= Jerome Kurtz =

American lawyer

Jerome Kurtz (May 19, 1931 – February 27, 2015) was an American tax lawyer who served as the Commissioner of Internal Revenue from 1977 to 1980 during the Carter administration. He left the IRS in 1980 to return to private practice.

Kurtz was born in Philadelphia, Pennsylvania, on May 19, 1931. He received a bachelor's degree in accounting from Temple University in 1952 and his law degree from Harvard Law School in 1955. He then enlisted in the U.S. Army, where he served for two years. He married his wife, artist Elaine Etta Kahn, in 1952.

During the Johnson administration, Kurtz was employed as a tax legislative counsel for the United States Department of Treasury from 1966 to 1968. He was a vocal opponent of policies which favored higher income taxpayers during his tenure at the Treasury Department. Kurtz also did preliminary work on the Tax Reform Act of 1969, which created an alternative minimum tax aimed at wealthier taxpayers who took extensive tax deductions.

Kurtz returned to private practice after leaving the Treasury Department. He was a partner at Wolf, Block, Schorr and Solis-Cohen, a firm in Philadelphia, prior to his appointment as head of the IRS in 1977.

Jerome Kurtz was appointed Commissioner of Internal Revenue by President Jimmy Carter in 1977. Kurtz sought to reverse tax policies that were seen as excessively beneficial to wealthier tax payers. For example, he targeted so-called "silver butterfly" commodities transactions, in which investors in silver staggered their losses and profits to lower their taxes on the sales. Under Kurtz, the IRS launched a crackdown on the abuse on tax shelters by both corporations and individuals. Kurtz also moved to tax "fringe benefits," such as the use of company cars by employees, but those plans were quashed by the United States House Committee on Ways and Means.

Kurtz stepped down as Commissioner of the IRS in 1980. He returned to private practice at the Paul, Weiss, Rifkind, Wharton & Garrison firm in Washington D.C. He also lectured on tax law and taxation at both the University of Pennsylvania and Villanova University and served as a visiting professor at Harvard Law School.

Jerome Kurtz died from complications of surgery in New York City on February 27, 2015, at the age of 83. He was survived by his two daughters, Maddie Kurtz and Nettie Kurtz Greenstein. His late wife, Elaine Kahn Kurtz, whom he had been married to for 47 years, died in 2003.

Government offices
Preceded by William E. Williams; Acting	Commissioner of Internal Revenue; May 5, 1977 – October 31, 1980	Succeeded by William E. Williams; Acting
