= Roscoe L. Egger Jr. =

American IRS tax official (1920–1999)

Roscoe Lynn Egger Jr. (September 19, 1920 – October 14, 1999) served as Commissioner of Internal Revenue from 1981 to 1986 and received the Tax Executive Institute's Distinguished Service Award in 1986. He led the Internal Revenue Service through a tumultuous time in its history and pushed for numerous reforms in order to modernize the tax service.

== Early life ==
Roscoe L. Egger Jr. was born in Jackson, Michigan, on September 19, 1920. He attended Indiana University Bloomington for his undergraduate work before serving in the Army. His actions in Europe during World War II earned him a Bronze Star and a Purple Heart.

After being discharged from the Army, Egger earned a law degree from George Washington University Law School. He worked for the General Accounting Office after graduation, and later worked as a private tax accountant. He joined Price Waterhouse in 1956.

Egger immediately became involved in Price Waterhouse's tax practice as a specialist. He was partner in charge of the firm's tax practice at its Washington, D.C. office before heading Price Waterhouse's newly formed Office of Government Services upon its creation in 1973. Egger continued in this role until he was nominated by President Ronald Reagan to be tax commissioner on January 24, 1981.

== Tax Commissioner ==
He became the second CPA to head the Internal Revenue Service (IRS). While Egger served as Tax Commissioner, the IRS was faced with a number of problems. Tax evasion increased dramatically, the tax code was overly complicated, the IRS's budget was too small, and its computers were overworked and out of date. The disasters of 1985 – in which hundreds of thousands of returns simply vanished, and the failure of the IRS's computers led to long delays – led Egger to make a public apology to the American taxpayers on behalf of the entire IRS.

Major improvements were made to the IRS under Egger's watch. He helped draft the Tax Reform Act of 1986, which included legislation that simplified the Federal tax code and closed many loopholes in the old code. In 1986, Egger secured a bigger budget for the IRS and dramatically increased the IRS's computers in both number and power. Many service centers had their numbers of computers increased by as much as 50%, and the number of central computers around the country was increased as well. Even so, Egger stated in a 1990 interview that the IRS's computer system was still woefully inadequate at that time and needed a complete overhaul.

Not all of Egger's goals were realized while he was Commissioner, however. Egger promoted the "return free" system in a 1984 Tax Reform Study. The idea behind this system was that a simplified tax code, coupled with the rapid increases in computing power, could lead to a tax system in which the government could quickly calculate a taxpayer's liability or refund and then simply send them a statement for them to approve and sign. Egger predicted that by 1990, two out of three taxpayers would be able to pay their taxes or receive refunds in this way. Trials performed as part of the Tax Reform Act of 1986 revealed a small, but significant number of errors and the IRS was unsure how its already strained bureaucracy would deal with taxpayers when it was the IRS, and not the taxpayer, with a deficiency.

While the "return free" system has never been implemented, today's omnipresence of computers and the rise of the internet led to the availability of online filing. The ability to file online and have the return completed by a computer is similar to the simplicity of the "return free" system in many respects.

== Later life ==
Egger left the IRS in 1990 and returned to Price Waterhouse as a consultant. He retired to Green Valley, Arizona, and died at the age of 79 at the Mayo Clinic in Rochester, Minnesota, on October 14, 1999, following heart surgery.

== Notes ==
- "In memoriam - Roscoe L. Egger". Tax Executive. 51 (6). Archived from the original on November 20, 2004 – via FindArticles.
- Egger, Roscoe, Jr. (October 23, 1999). "79, Dies; Former Head of the IRS". The New York Times.
- Nomination of Roscoe L. Egger, Jr. 1/24/1981
- Egger, Roscoe, Jr. (October 23, 1999). "79, Dies; Former Head of the IRS". The New York Times.
- Egger, Roscoe, Jr. (October 23, 1999). "79, Dies; Former Head of the IRS". The New York Times.
- "In memoriam - Roscoe L. Egger". Tax Executive. 51 (6). Archived from the original on November 20, 2004 – via FindArticles.
- Can Filing Be Simplified for Most Taxpayers? 12/21/1998
- Egger, Roscoe, Jr. (October 23, 1999). "79, Dies; Former Head of the IRS". The New York Times.

Government offices
Preceded by William E. Williams; Acting	Commissioner of Internal Revenue; March 14, 1981 – April 30, 1986	Succeeded by James I. Owens; Acting
