= Randolph W. Thrower =

American lawyer (1913–2014)

Randolph Thrower
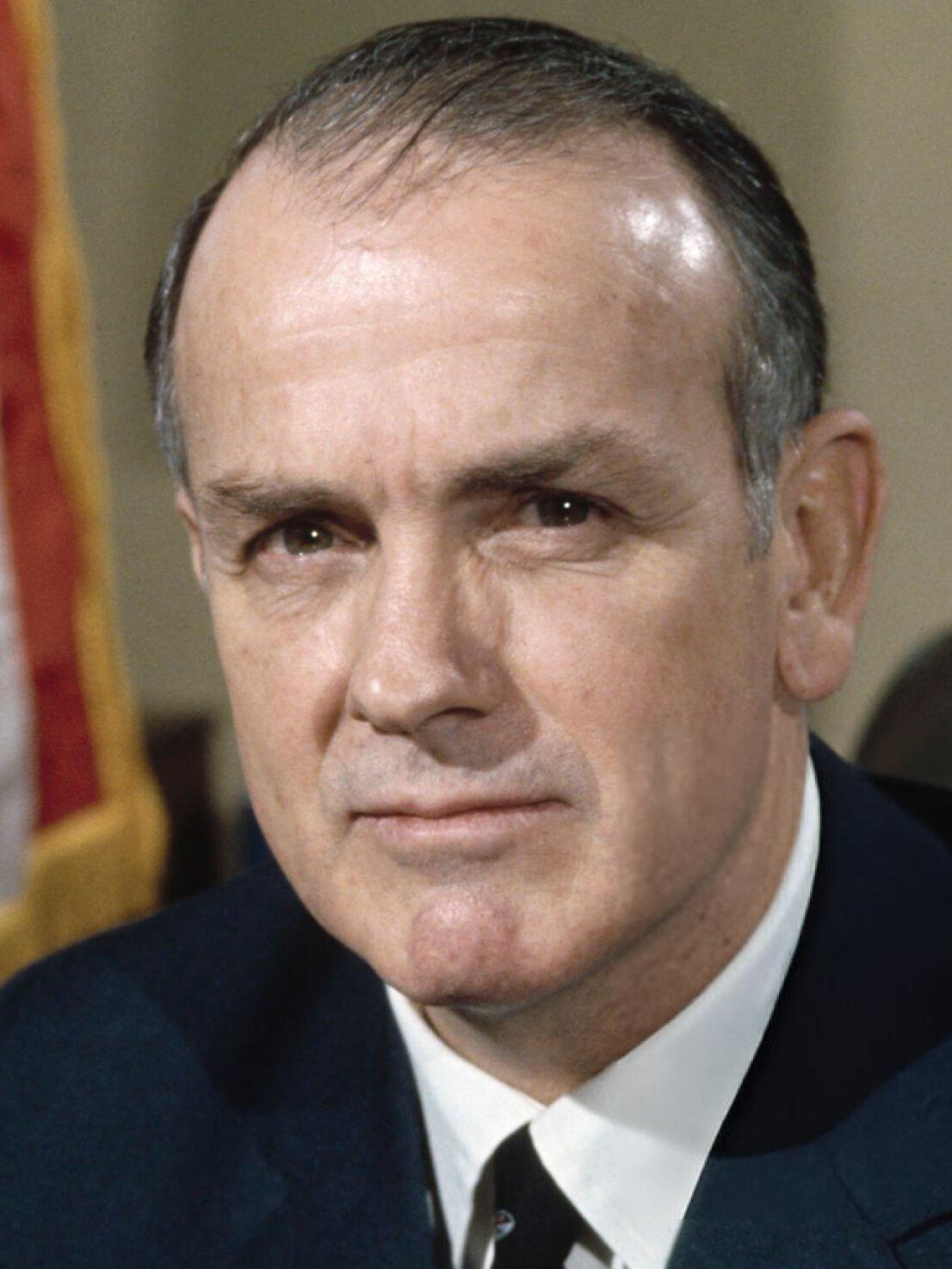
- Commissioner Thrower in 1969

36th Commissioner of Internal Revenue
- In office April 1, 1969 – June 22, 1971
- President: Richard Nixon
- Preceded by: Sheldon S. Cohen
- Succeeded by: Johnnie Mac Walters

Personal details
- Born: September 5, 1913 Tampa, Florida, U.S.
- Died: March 8, 2014 (aged 100) Atlanta, Georgia, U.S.
- Party: Republican
- Spouse: Margaret Logan Munroe (m. 1939; died 2009)
- Children: 5
- Education: Georgia Military Academy; Emory University (BA, LLB)

Military service
- Branch/service: United States Marine Corps
- Rank: Captain
- Battles/wars: World War II; Pacific Theater

Randolph William Thrower (September 5, 1913 – March 8, 2014) was an American attorney. He served as Commissioner of Internal Revenue under President Richard Nixon from 1969 to 1971.

== Early life and education ==
Thrower was born in Tampa, Florida. He graduated from Georgia Military Academy in 1930. He received an undergraduate degree from Emory University in 1934 and received his law degree from the Emory University School of Law in 1936.

== Career ==
Following graduation from law school he joined the firm of Sutherland Asbill & Brennan LLP, a law firm with principal offices in Atlanta and Washington, D.C. He became a partner and remained one until his death. Many of his early cases involved handling appeals for death row inmates in Georgia prisons. According to the New York Times, Thrower was haunted for the rest of his life by the case of his client Will Coxson, a black teenager who had been convicted for rape. Thrower was convinced he was innocent. Thrower had just joined the United States Marines, so he let another lawyer take over the appeal, believing that Coxson would surely be acquitted by the Supreme Court of Georgia. However, Coxson was put to death while Thrower was serving in World War II.

In 1942 he joined the FBI, then became a captain in the U.S. Marine Corps, being deployed to the Philippines and Okinawa during World War II.

Thrower was Chairman of the Fulton County Republican Party. In 1956, Thrower, running as a Republican, unsuccessfully challenged incumbent segregationist James C. Davis for a seat in Congress. In the election, he received a majority of support from Black voters.

He served as Commissioner of Internal Revenue under President Richard Nixon from 1969 to 1971. During his tenure he revoked the tax-exempt status of private schools that excluded blacks. He also helped to draft the Tax Reform Act of 1969. However, he was alarmed by requests from the White House for the IRS to perform tax audits on Nixon's enemies. In 1971 he requested a meeting with Nixon, believing that the president would be horrified to learn that some of his aides were attempting to use the IRS for political purposes. Instead of a meeting with Nixon, he got a phone call from John D. Ehrlichman telling him that he was fired. He accepted the White House announcement that he had "resigned for personal reasons" and quietly returned to the Atlanta law firm. A few years later he visited the IRS headquarters on business, where he was spontaneously greeted by employees as a hero.

From 1980 to 1992 he was chairman of the City of Atlanta's Board of Ethics.

== Recognition ==
In 1993, Thrower received the American Bar Association Medal, the ABA's highest honor, for his public, professional, and government service. He was the recipient in 1995 of the Court of Federal Claims Special Service Award and received the Tax Section's Distinguished Service Award for 1996. In 1992 he received the Leadership Award of the Atlanta Bar Association and more recently the Segal-Tweed Founders Award of the Lawyers' Committee for Civil Rights Under Law. Thrower was presented with the "American Inns of Court Professionalism Award for the Eleventh Circuit" in May 2003.

== Personal life ==
He was married for 70 years to Margaret Logan Munroe, whom he met at Emory. They lived in Atlanta and had five children. She predeceased him on February 17, 2009. He turned 100 on September 5, 2013 and died on March 8, 2014, at his home in Atlanta.

== Electoral history ==
Georgia's 5th congressional district:

Year	Republican	Votes	%	Democratic	Votes	%
1956	Randolph Thrower	58,777	40.8%	√ James C. Davis	85,292	59.2%

== See also ==
- List of centenarians (jurists and practitioners of law)

Government offices
Preceded by William H. Smith; Acting	Commissioner of Internal Revenue; April 1, 1969 – June 22, 1971	Succeeded by Harold T. Swartz; Acting
