= Knut Söderwall =

Swedish jurist and civil servant (1874 – 1980)

Knut Emil Söderwall (14 December 1874–14 January 1980) was a Swedish jurist and civil servant. He served as a Justice of the Supreme Administrative Court from 1923 to 1943.

Knut Söderwall was born in 1874 in Ronneby. He studied law at Lund University and graduated in 1897 with a Degree of Master of Laws (LL.M.). He served as a notary in the Scania and Blekinge Court of Appeal from 1906 and was appointed judge referee at the Supreme Court in 1911. He subsequently served in the Royal Chancery, as Director General for Administrative Affairs in the Ministry of Land Defence from 1917. He was appointed State secretary in the Ministry of Defence in 1922 (acting från 1920). Söderwall served as a Justice of the Supreme Administrative Court from 1923 until his retirement in 1943. From 1937, he was the court's oldest member and thus its president.

He died in 1980 in Stockholm, aged 105.

His uncle was Knut Fredrik Söderwall, a member of the Swedish Academy.
