= Johnnie Mac Walters =

American lawyer and civil servant

Johnnie McKeiver Walters (December 20, 1919 – June 24, 2014) was an American lawyer and civil servant who served as a United States Assistant Attorney General from 1969 to 1971 and the Commissioner of Internal Revenue from August 6, 1971, to April 30, 1973.

== Early life and education ==
He was born in Lydia, South Carolina and initially lived in a house without electricity or running water. He enrolled in Furman University in 1938, where he majored in economics and graduated in 1942. During World War II he served in the U.S. Army Air Forces, mustering out as a First Lieutenant. He then entered the University of Michigan Law School, graduating in 1948.

== Career ==
He worked for five years in the office of the chief counsel for the Internal Revenue Service (IRS). He then worked for Texaco in New York City before moving to Greenville, South Carolina, where he established a private practice as a tax attorney.

In 1969 he was appointed an Assistant Attorney General in the Richard Nixon administration. In 1971 Nixon appointed him as Internal Revenue Commissioner, to replace Randolph W. Thrower, who had been fired for resisting attempts by the administration to order tax audits or obtain tax records on Nixon's political opponents. In 1972, three months after the Watergate break-in, Nixon's White House Counsel John Dean gave Walters a list of "enemies" and told him to order IRS investigations on them. Instead, Walters put the list in an envelope, sealed it, and locked in his safe, after obtaining permission to do nothing from his superior, Secretary of the Treasury George Shultz. Walters later commented, "By refusing to implement the request we preserved our tax system and also kept me out of jail." A few months later, after knowledge of the list became public, he turned the still-sealed envelope over to the executive director of the Congressional Joint Tax Committee.

After resigning as IRS Commissioner in 1973, Walters practiced law in Washington, D.C. for five years, then returned to Greenville and joined a law firm there. He retired from law practice at age 77 but continued to do financial consulting until he was 85.

In 2011 he published his memoirs, Our Journey.

== Personal life ==
He married Donna Hall, whom he met on his first day at the University of Michigan. They were married for 66 years and had four children. He died in Greenville at age 94.

Government offices
Preceded by Harold T. Swartz; Acting	Commissioner of Internal Revenue; August 6, 1971 – April 30, 1973	Succeeded by Raymond F. Harless; Acting
