= Internal Revenue Service Building =

- U.S. Historic district – Contributing property
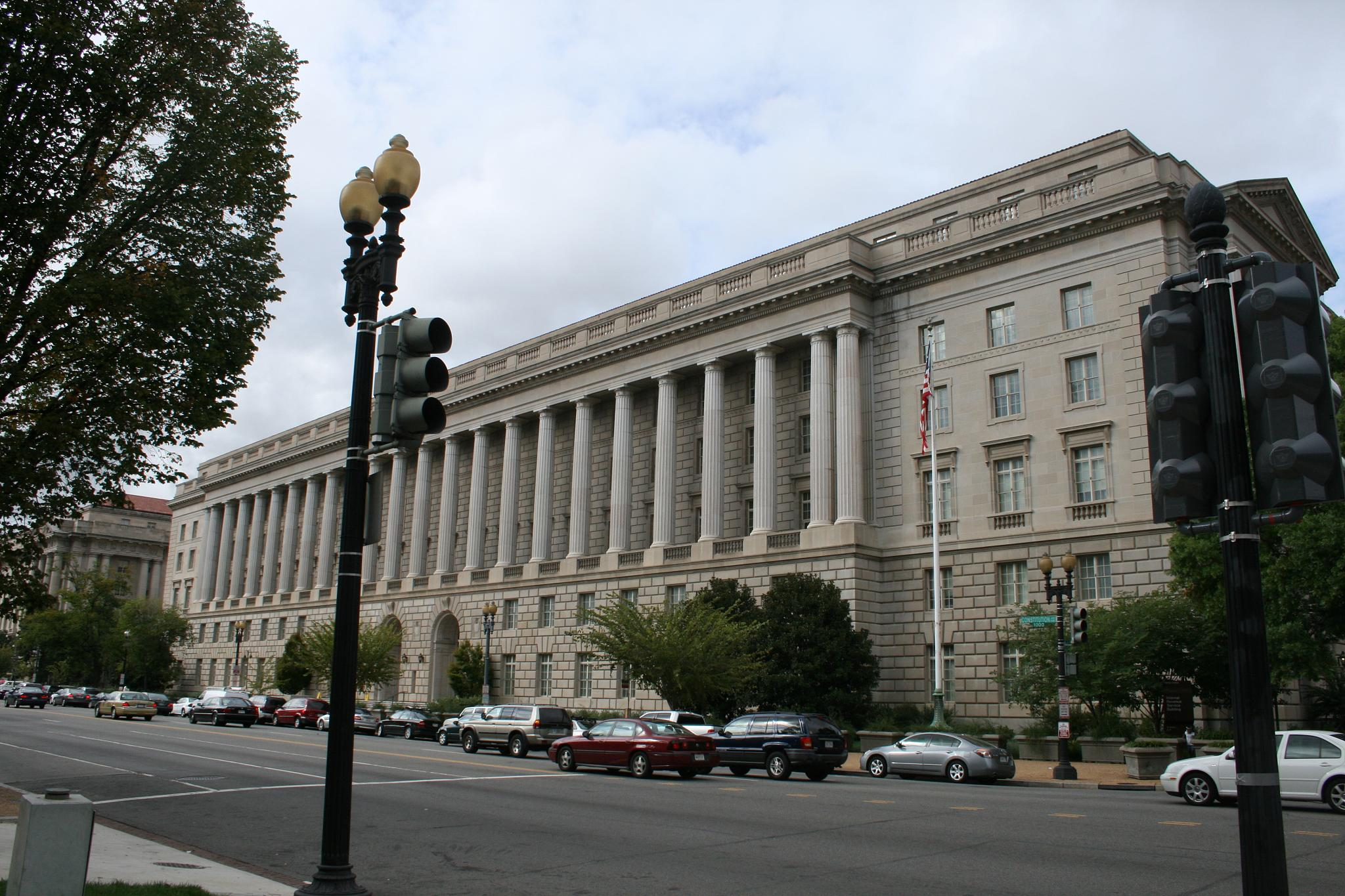
- Internal Revenue Service Building in 2008

- Location within Washington, D.C.
- Location: 1111 Constitution Avenue, Northwest; Washington, D.C., U.S.
- Coordinates: 38°53′36″N 77°1′37″W
- Built: 1936
- Architect: Office of the Supervising Architect
- Architectural style: Classical Revival
- Part of: Pennsylvania Avenue National Historic Site (ID66000865)

Internal Revenue Service Building
- Internal Revenue Service Building
- Interactive map of the Internal Revenue Service Building area

General information
- Architectural style: Classical Revival
- Location: Washington, D.C., Washington, D.C., The United States of America
- Owner: United States Government

Technical details
- Floor count: 7
- Lifts/elevators: 17

Design and construction
- Architect: Louis A. Simon

The Internal Revenue Service Building is a federal building which serves as the headquarters of the Internal Revenue Service. It is located at 1111 Constitution Avenue, Northwest, Washington, D.C. (corner of 12th Street), in the Federal Triangle.

== Building history ==
The building was designed by architects and engineers in the Office of the Supervising Architect under Louis A. Simon, and built from 1928 to 1936. The cornerstone was laid in 1929 by Treasury Secretary Andrew W. Mellon. The building was opened for use in 1930, 16 months ahead of the planned completion date, making it the first Federal Triangle building to be opened.

The building was designated by Congress as a contributing structure to the Pennsylvania Avenue National Historic Site in 1966, and was subsequently listed in the National Register of Historic Places.

An inscription above the main entrance of the building bears a quotation from Supreme Court justice Oliver Wendell Holmes Jr (1841–1935), "Taxes are what we pay for a civilized society."
