= Digital Accountability and Transparency Act of 2014 =

Federal U.S. law

- Long title: To expand the Federal Funding Accountability and Transparency Act of 2006 to increase accountability and transparency in Federal spending, and for other purposes.
- Announced in: the 113th United States Congress
- Sponsored by: Sen. Mark R. Warner (D, VA)
- Number of co-sponsors: 1

Citations
- Public law: Pub. L. 113–101 (text) (PDF)
- Statutes at Large: 128 Stat. 1146

Codification
- Acts affected: Federal Funding Accountability and Transparency Act of 2006, Social Security Act, American Recovery and Reinvestment Act of 2009, Disaster Relief Appropriations Act of 2013, Privacy Act of 1974, Freedom of Information Act, and the Internal Revenue Code of 1986
- U.S.C. sections affected: 31 U.S.C. § 3512, 31 U.S.C. § 6101, 31 U.S.C. § 1122, 31 U.S.C. § 3711, 5 U.S.C. § 552a, and others.
- Agencies affected: Social Security Administration, Recovery Accountability and Transparency Board, Government Accountability Office, United States House of Representatives, General Services Administration, Federal Bureau of Prisons, Executive Office of the President, United States Congress, Office of Management and Budget, United States Department of the Treasury, Department of Housing and Urban Development

Legislative history
- Introduced in the Senate as S. 994 by Sen. Mark R. Warner (D, VA) on May 21, 2013; Committee consideration by United States Senate Committee on Homeland Security and Governmental Affairs; Passed the Senate on April 10, 2014 (Unanimous consent); Passed the House on April 28, 2014 (voice vote); Signed into law by President Barack Obama on May 9, 2014

The Digital Accountability and Transparency Act of 2014 (DATA Act) is a law that aims to make information on federal expenditures more easily accessible and transparent. The law requires the U.S. Department of the Treasury to establish common standards for financial data provided by all government agencies and to expand the amount of data that agencies must provide to the government website, USASpending.gov. The goal of the law is to improve the ability of Americans to track and understand how the government is spending their tax dollars.

The law was introduced into the United States Senate during the 113th United States Congress. A similar bill, the Digital Accountability and Transparency Act of 2013 (H.R. 2061; 113th Congress), was introduced at the same time in the United States House of Representatives. There was also a previous version of the bill (H.R. 2146) that passed in the House during the 112th United States Congress, but did not become law. On May 9, 2014, President Barack Obama signed this version of the bill into law.

== Provisions of the bill ==
This summary is based largely on the summary provided by the Congressional Research Service, a public domain source.

The Digital Accountability and Transparency Act of 2014 (DATA Act) stated its purposes to be to:

- expand the Federal Funding Accountability and Transparency Act of 2006 by disclosing direct federal agency expenditures and linking federal contract, loan, and grant spending information to federal programs to enable taxpayers and policy makers to track federal spending more effectively;
- establish government-wide data standards for financial data and provide consistent, reliable, searchable, and usable government-wide spending data on USASpending.gov for taxpayers and policy makers;
- simplify reporting for entities receiving federal funds by streamlining reporting requirements and reducing compliance costs while improving transparency;
- improve the quality of data submitted to USASpending.gov by holding federal agencies accountable for the completeness and accuracy of the data submitted; and
- apply approaches developed by the Recovery Accountability and Transparency Board to spending across the federal government.

Section 3 of the bill amended the Federal Funding Accountability and Transparency Act of 2006 to define "federal agency," for the bill's purposes, to mean an executive department, a government corporation, or an independent establishment.

The bill directed the Secretary of the Treasury to ensure that information on funds made available to or expended by a federal agency would be posted online quarterly and when practical monthly, in a searchable, downloadable format.

The bill directed the Secretary and the Director of the Office of Management and Budget (OMB) to establish government-wide financial data standards for federal funds and entities receiving such funds. Requires such data standards, to the extent reasonable and practicable, to: (1) incorporate widely accepted common data elements and a widely accepted, nonproprietary, searchable, platform-independent, computer-readable format; (2) include government-wide universal identifiers for federal awards and entities; (3) be consistent with and implement applicable accounting principles; (4) be capable of being continually updated; (5) produce consistent and comparable data; and (6) establish a standard method of conveying the reporting period, reporting entity, unit of measure, and other associated attributes.

The bill required the Secretary and the Director to issue guidance to federal agencies on such data standards and consult with public and private stakeholders in establishing such standards.

The bill required the Director to review the information required to be reported by recipients of federal awards to identify: (1) common reporting elements across the federal government, (2) unnecessary duplication in financial reporting, and (3) unnecessarily burdensome reporting requirements for recipients of federal awards.

The bill required the Director to establish a two-year pilot program to develop recommendations for: (1) standardized reporting elements across the federal government, (2) the elimination of unnecessary duplication in financial reporting, and (3) the reduction of compliance costs for recipients of federal awards. Requires such pilot program to include: (1) a combination of federal contracts, grants, and subawards, with an aggregate value of not less than $1 billion and not more than $2 billion; (2) a diverse group of recipients of federal awards; (3) recipients who receive awards from multiple programs across multiple agencies; and (4) data collected during a 12-month reporting cycle.

The bill would require the Director, not later than 90 days after the termination of the pilot program, to submit a report to the House Committees on the Budget and Oversight and Government Reform and the Senate Committees on the Budget and Homeland Security and Governmental Affairs that includes: (1) a description of the data collected under the pilot program, its usefulness, and the cost to collect the data from other recipients; and (2) recommendations.

The bill directed the Inspector General of each federal agency to: (1) review a statistically valid sampling of the spending data submitted under this Act by the federal agency; and (2) submit to Congress and make publicly available a report assessing the completeness, timeliness, quality, and accuracy of the data sampled and the implementation and use of data standards by the federal agency.

The bill would direct the Comptroller General (GAO) to submit a publicly available report to Congress assessing and comparing the data completeness, timeliness, quality, and accuracy of the data submitted under this Act by federal agencies and the implementation and use of data standards by federal agencies.

The bill would authorize the Secretary to establish a data analysis center, or expand an existing service, to provide data, analytic tools, and data management techniques to support: (1) the prevention and reduction of improper payments, and (2) the improvement of efficiency and transparency in federal spending. Transfers assets of the Recovery Accountability and Transparency Board to the Department of the Treasury upon the establishment of the data analysis center.

The bill declared that nothing in this Act: (1) shall require disclosure to the public of information protected from disclosure under the Freedom of Information Act (FOIA) or information protected under the Privacy Act of 1974 or the Internal Revenue Code; and (2) shall be construed to create a private right of action.

Section 4 would require the OMB Director to make available on the OMB website a financial management status report and government-wide five-year financial management plan.

Section 5 would require a federal agency to notify the Secretary of the Treasury of any legally enforceable non-tax debt owed to such agency that is over 120 (currently, 180) days delinquent so that the Secretary can offset such debt administratively. Requires the Secretary to notify Congress of any instance in which an agency fails to notify the Secretary of such a debt.

== Congressional Budget Office report ==
This summary is based largely on the summary provided by the Congressional Budget Office, as ordered reported by the Senate Committee on Homeland Security and Governmental Affairs on November 6, 2013. This is a public domain source.

S. 994 aims to make information on federal expenditures more easily accessible and transparent. The bill would require the U.S. Department of the Treasury to establish common standards for financial data provided by all government agencies and to expand the amount of data that agencies must provide to the government website, USASpending. In addition, the Office of Management and Budget (OMB) would be required to conduct a two-year pilot program to make it easier for federal contractors and grant recipients to comply with federal reporting requirements. S. 994 also would require OMB, the Government Accountability Office, and the agencies’ Inspectors General to submit additional reports to the Congress. Finally, the legislation would designate the Treasury Franchise Fund as the source of funding for the bill's implementation.

The Congressional Budget Office (CBO) estimates that implementing the bill would cost $300 million over the 2014-2018 period, assuming appropriation of the necessary amounts. The legislation also could affect direct spending by agencies not funded through annual appropriations; therefore, pay-as-you-go procedures apply. The CBO estimates, however, that any net increase in spending by those agencies would not be significant. Enacting the bill would not affect revenues.

S. 994 contains no intergovernmental or private-sector mandates as defined in the Unfunded Mandates Reform Act; any costs to state, local, or tribal governments would result from complying with conditions for receiving federal assistance.

== Procedural history ==
The Digital Accountability and Transparency Act of 2014 was introduced into the United States Senate on May 21, 2013, by Sen. Mark R. Warner (D, VA). It was referred to the United States Senate Committee on Homeland Security and Governmental Affairs. It was reported on March 27, 2014, alongside Senate Report 113-139. On April 10, 2014, the Senate voted to pass the bill by unanimous consent. On April 28, 2014, the United States House of Representatives voted in a voice vote to pass the bill. On May 9, 2014, President Barack Obama signed the bill into law.

== Debate and discussion ==
Rep. Darrell Issa (R-CA), a major supporter of the bill, said that "the DATA Act is but a first shot of a technological revolution that will transform the way we govern." Issa also thought that "the American people deserve to know if their taxpayer dollars are being wasted or if they are being spent wisely."

Delegate Eleanor Holmes Norton (D-DC) said that "this will improve the quality of data that agencies make available about their spending."

The National Taxpayers Union (NTU) urged Representatives to vote in favor of the bill, saying that "this legislation would take an important step toward greater accountability to taxpayers by providing more information on how their hard-earned dollars are spent." The NTU argued that "the DATA Act would bring increased transparency to a system that is too often rife with favoritism, waste, and fraud. As the federal government continues to make heavy demands on the public's paychecks, taxpayers deserve the opportunity to find out more details about how the money they send to Washington is being spent."

The Data Coalition and the American Institute of Certified Public Accountants supported the bill.

The Data Foundation published two research reports related to the Digital Accountability and Transparency (DATA) Act. "The Data Act: Vision & Value", co-published by MorganFranklin, describes the law's history and mandates, surveys its benefits, and outlines the challenges it faces. A second report, published in May 2017, lays out a comprehensive long-term vision for the DATA Act, and discusses how the law is set to evolve beyond its statutory implementation deadline of November 2021.

== See also ==
- List of bills in the 113th United States Congress
- Acts of the 113th United States Congress
- List of United States federal agencies
