= USAspending.gov =

Database of spending by the United States federal government

- Owner: United States of America
- Website: usaspending.gov
- Launched: December 13, 2007; 18 years ago

USAspending.gov is a database of spending by the United States federal government.

== History ==
Around the time of the Federal Funding Accountability and Transparency Act of 2006's passage, OMB Watch, a government watchdog group, was developing a site that would do essentially everything the legislation required. Gary Bass, director of OMB Watch, contacted Robert Shea, associate director of the OMB, offering to help with development of the new site. Shea was initially reluctant to collaborate with Bass, in part because OMB Watch is typically critical of the OMB, but eventually it was determined that the government site would be based on what OMB Watch was developing, with the group being paid $600,000 for their technology. In 2008, the government's site offered the same data, API, and (for the most part) documentation as the OMB Watch site, fedspending.org.

The Federal Funding Accountability and Transparency Act of 2006 delegated responsibility for creating the website to the Office of Management and Budget.

The 2011 United States federal budget reduced funding for the Electronic Government Fund, from which USASpending.gov drew its funding. The budget had a small increase for the fund in 2012.

The Digital Accountability and Transparency Act of 2014 (DATA Act) established common standards for financial data provided by all government agencies and expanded the amount of data that agencies must provide to USASpending.gov.

On May 9, 2017, Steven Mnuchin, the United States Secretary of the Treasury, announced that Treasury updated the site, providing a much broader view of government spending. 18F contributed to development of the revised site.

== See also ==
- System for Award Management (SAM.gov)
