= Digital Accountability and Transparency Act of 2013 =

- Long title: To expand the Federal Funding Accountability and Transparency Act of 2006 to increase accountability and transparency in Federal spending, and for other purposes.
- Announced in: the 113th United States Congress
- Sponsored by: Rep. Darrell E. Issa (R, CA-49)
- Number of co-sponsors: 1

Codification
- Acts affected: Federal Funding Accountability and Transparency Act of 2006, Privacy Act of 1974, Internal Revenue Code of 1986, and others.
- U.S.C. sections affected: 31 U.S.C. § 6101, 31 U.S.C. § 3512, 5 U.S.C. § 552a, 31 U.S.C. § 1115, 5 U.S.C. § 105, and others.
- Agencies affected: United States Congress, Government Accountability Office, Executive Office of the President, Office of Management and Budget, United States Department of the Treasury, General Services Administration

Legislative history
- Introduced in the House as H.R. 2061 by Rep. Darrell E. Issa (R, CA-49) on May 21, 2013; Committee consideration by United States House Committee on Oversight and Government Reform

The Digital Accountability and Transparency Act of 2013 (H.R. 2061) aims to make information on federal expenditures more easily available, accessible, and transparent. The bill would change reporting requirements about financial data and start a pilot program to research best practices. The bill was introduced in the House during the 113th United States Congress.

== Background ==
A previous version of the bill (H.R. 2146) was also sponsored by Rep Issa. It passed in the House during the 112th United States Congress, but did not become law.

== Provisions of the bill ==
This summary is based largely on the summary provided by the Congressional Research Service, a public domain source.

The Digital Accountability and Transparency Act of 2013 would amend the Federal Funding Accountability and Transparency Act of 2006 to:

- transfer from the Director of the Office of Management and Budget (OMB) to the United States Secretary of the Treasury the responsibility for maintaining the website established by such Act (i.e., USAspending.gov) to provide public information about awards of federal funds;
- require spending data for all federal funds to indicate the appropriation, federal agency, sub-agency, account, program activity, and object class (the category assigned for purposes of the annual budget of the President to the type of property or services purchased by the federal government) for such funds;
- require the Secretary of the Treasury to establish government-wide financial data standards for federal funds;
- require the Director of OMB to review the financial reporting required by federal agencies to consolidate financial reporting and reduce duplicative reporting;
- require the Inspectors General at each federal agency and the Comptroller General to report biennially on the completeness, timeliness, quality, and accuracy of spending data submitted by each agency;
- require the Recovery Accountability and Transparency Board (Board) to develop and test information technology resources and oversight mechanisms to enhance the transparency of, and detect and remediate waste, fraud, and abuse in, federal spending for Inspectors General; and
- require the Board to maintain a website to inform the public about activities to identify waste, fraud, and abuse in federal spending.

The bill would require the Recovery Accountability and Transparency Board to establish a pilot program relating to reporting by recipients of federal funds to increase financial transparency to: (1) display the full cycle of federal funds, (2) improve the accuracy of federal financial data, and (3) develop recommendations for reducing reporting requirements by consolidating and automating financial reporting requirements across the federal government.

The bill would amend the American Recovery and Reinvestment Act of 2009 to terminate on September 30, 2013, reporting requirements relating to the use of funds under such Act, oversight functions of the Board, and the requirement that the Board maintain a public website. The bill would extend the termination date for the Board until September 30, 2017. It would amend the Disaster Relief Appropriations Act of 2013 to eliminate the Board's responsibility for monitoring the expenditure of funds related to Hurricane Sandy.

The bill would require the Director of OMB to make required financial management status reports and government-wide five-year financial management plans available on the OMB website.

== Congressional Budget Office report ==
This summary is based largely on the summary provided by the Congressional Budget Office, as ordered reported by the House Committee on Oversight and Government Reform on May 22, 2013. This is a public domain source.

H.R. 2061 aims to make information on federal expenditures more easily available, accessible, and transparent. The bill would require the U.S. Department of the Treasury to establish common standards for financial data provided by all government agencies and to expand the amount of data that agencies must provide to the government website, USASpending. H.R. 2061 also would authorize the Recovery Accountability and Transparency Board to continue to operate through 2017 and would direct the board to conduct a three-year pilot program to make it easier for federal contractors and grant recipients to comply with reporting requirements. Finally, the legislation would require the Office of Management and Budget (OMB), the Government Accountability Office (GAO), and agency Inspectors General (IGs) to submit additional reports to the Congress.

The Congressional Budget Office (CBO) estimated that implementing the bill would cost $395 million over the 2014-2018 period, assuming appropriation of the necessary amounts, mostly for collecting and reporting financial information across government agencies. The legislation also could affect direct spending by agencies not funded through annual appropriations; therefore, pay-as-you-go procedures apply. The CBO estimated, however, that any net increase in spending by those agencies would not be significant. Enacting the bill would not affect revenues.

H.R. 2061 contains no intergovernmental or private-sector mandates as defined in the Unfunded Mandates Reform Act (UMRA); any costs to state, local, or tribal governments would result from complying with conditions for receiving federal assistance.

== Procedural history ==
The Digital Accountability and Transparency Act of 2013 was introduced into the United States House of Representatives on May 21, 2013 by Rep. Darrell E. Issa (R, CA-49). It was referred to the United States House Committee on Oversight and Government Reform, which considered and marked up the bill on May 22, 2013. It was ordered reported (amended) by the committee with a voice vote on May 22, 2013. On November 15, 2013, House Majority Leader Eric Cantor announced that the bill would be considered under a suspension of the rules on November 18, 2013.

A companion bill, the Digital Accountability and Transparency Act of 2014 (S. 994; 113th Congress), passed in both the House and the Senate.

== Debate and discussion ==
According to the Data Transparency Coalition, the Digital Accountability and Transparency Act of 2013 "will standardize and publish the U.S. government's wide variety of reports and data compilations related to financial management, procurement, and assistance. Better transparency, more effective federal management, and cheaper compliance will be the results." The Coalition argues that the legislation will make it possible for members of the public and watchdog organizations to track taxpayer money as it is appropriated, sent to agencies, and spent.

The American Institute of Certified Public Accountants (AICPA) wrote a letter supporting provisions of the DATA Act that would amend the Federal Funding Accountability and Transparency Act of 2006. They believe the act "appropriately specifies a financial data reporting standard that Federal agencies can implement using a currently available nonproprietary computer language. Ultimately, the benefits of using data standards to tag financial data will enhance the accuracy and transparency of financial and performance information." The data standard being discussed was XBRL (eXtensible Business Reporting Language), which AICPA approves of.

Trey Hodgkins of TechAmerica published an opinion article about the bill on September 23, 2013, mentioning specific areas his organization felt needed improvement. Those areas included more specificity about who was responsible for certain reports, concerns that "a user can identify trends and themes in the data to determine the U.S. government's plans," a lack of legal citation references, and odd timing on the pilot program relative to the other provisions.

== See also ==
- List of bills in the 113th United States Congress
