= Pork barrel =

Political tactic

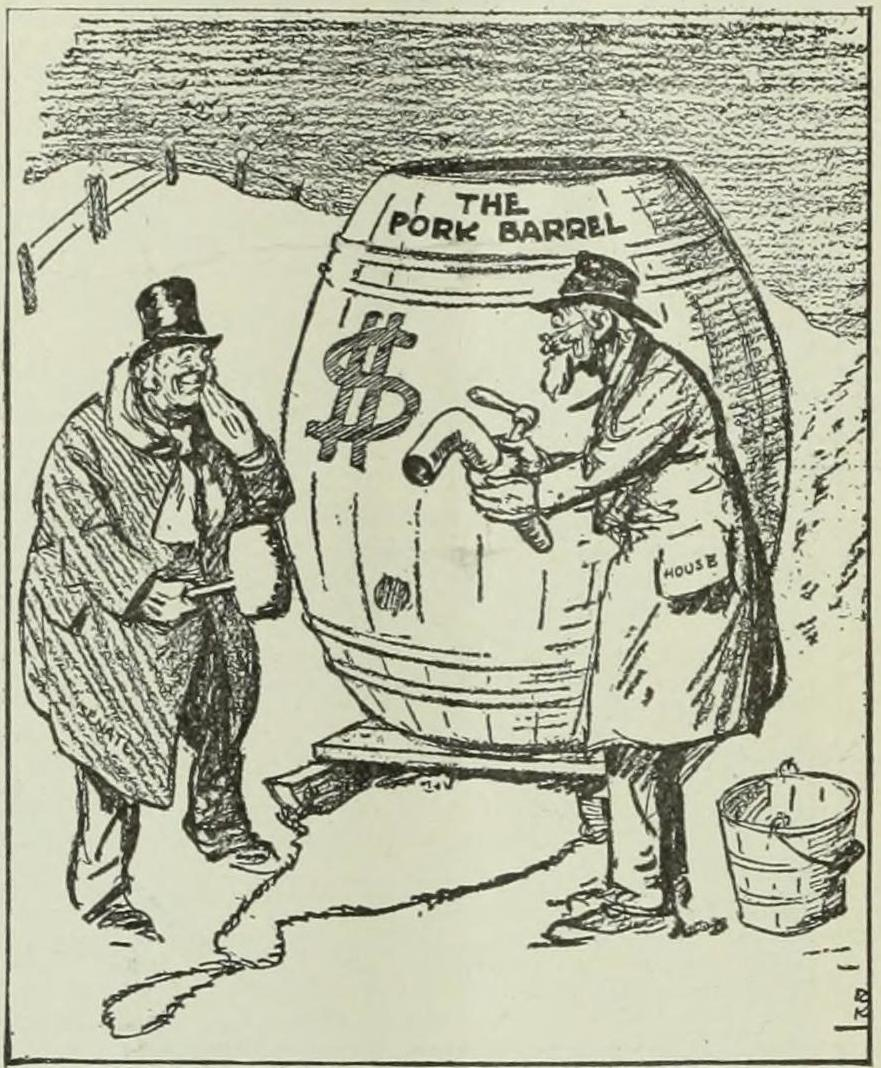
1917 cartoon from the New York World

Pork barrel, or simply pork, is a metaphor for allocating government spending to localized projects in the representative's district or for securing direct expenditures primarily serving the sole interests of the representative. The usage originated in American English, and it indicates a negotiated way of political particularism.

== Definition ==
Scholars use pork barrel as a technical term regarding legislative control of local appropriations. In election campaigns, the term is used in derogatory fashion to attack opponents. Typically, "pork" involves national funding for government programs whose economic or service benefits are concentrated in a particular area but whose costs are spread among all taxpayers. Public works projects, certain national defense spending projects, and agricultural subsidies are the most commonly cited examples. Citizens Against Government Waste, a fiscally conservative advocacy group, outlines seven criteria by which spending in the United States can be classified as "pork":

1. Requested by only one chamber of Congress
2. Not specifically authorized
3. Not competitively awarded
4. Not requested by the President
5. Greatly exceeds the President's budget request or the previous year's funding
6. Not the subject of Congressional hearings
7. Serves only a local or special interest.

== History and etymology ==
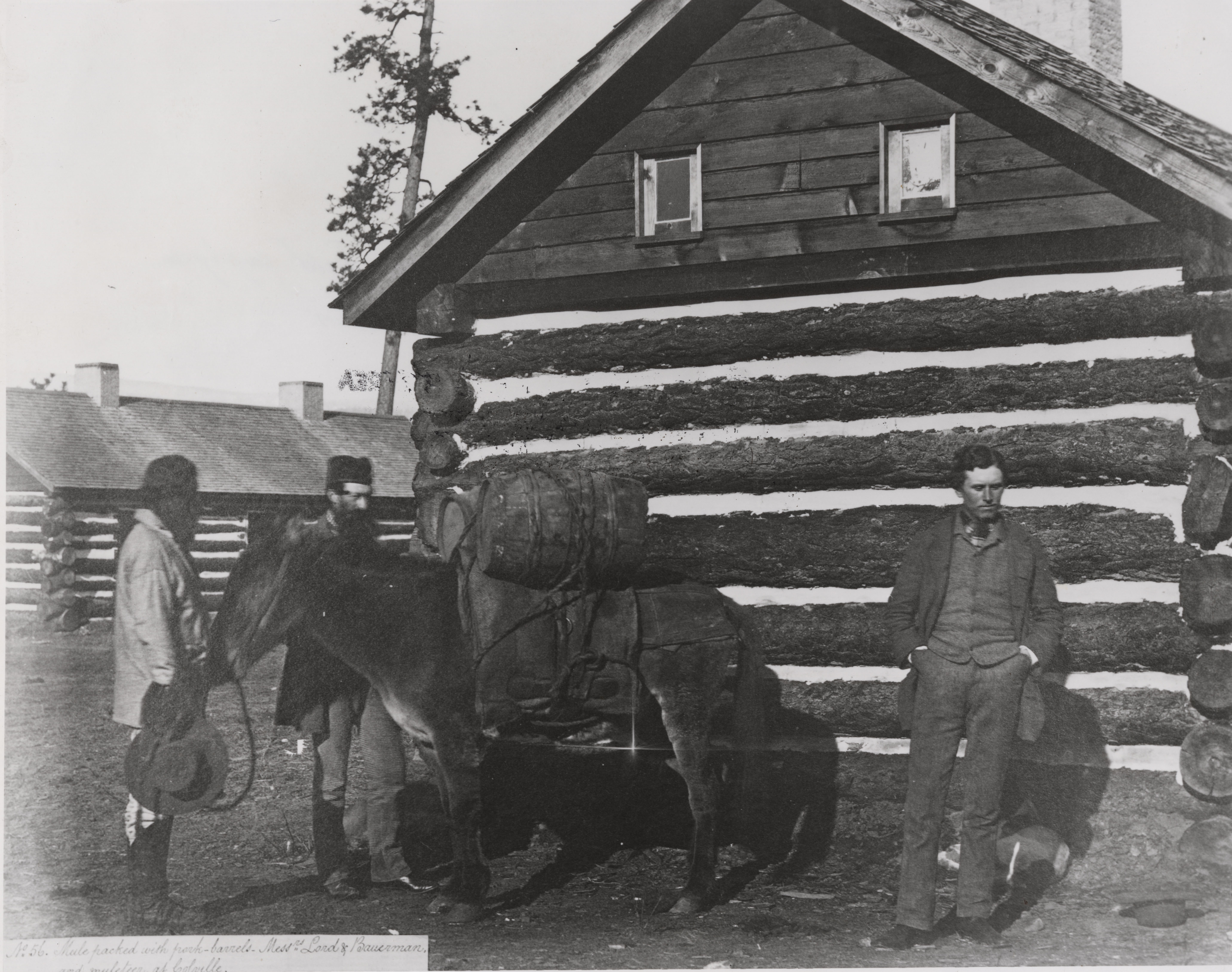
Pork barrels delivered by pack mule (1861)

In the absence of refrigeration, a popular historic method for preserving pork was by salting it in a barrel. The term pork barrel politics originated in American English, and usually refers to spending intended to benefit constituents of a politician in return for their political support, either in the form of campaign contributions or votes. In the popular 1863 story "The Children of the Public", Edward Everett Hale used the term pork barrel as a homely metaphor for any form of public spending to the citizenry; however, after the American Civil War, the term came to be used in a derogatory sense. The Oxford English Dictionary dates the modern sense of the term to 1910. By the 1870s, references to "pork" were common in Congress, and the term was further popularized by a 1919 article by Chester Collins Maxey in the National Municipal Review, which reported on certain legislative acts known to members of Congress as "pork barrel bills". He claimed that the phrase originated in a pre-Civil War practice of rationing salt pork to slaves, often resulting in a disorderly rush to grab a share.

== Examples ==
An early example of pork barrel politics in the United States was the Bonus Bill of 1817, which was introduced by Democratic-Republican John C. Calhoun to construct highways linking the Eastern and Southern United States to its Western frontier using the earnings bonus from the Second Bank of the United States. Calhoun argued for it using general welfare and post-roads clauses of the United States Constitution. Although he approved of the economic development goal, President James Madison vetoed the bill as unconstitutional.

One of the most famous alleged pork-barrel projects was the Big Dig in Boston, Massachusetts. The Big Dig was a project to relocate an existing 3.5-mile (5.6 km) section of the Interstate Highway System underground. The official planning phase started in 1982; the construction was done between 1991 and 2006, and the project concluded on December 31, 2007. It ended up costing US$14.6 billion, or over US$4 billion per mile. Tip O'Neill (D-Mass), after whom one of the Big Dig tunnels was named, pushed to have the Big Dig funded by the federal government while he was the speaker of the United States House of Representatives.

During the 2008 United States presidential election campaign, the Gravina Island Bridge (also known as the "Bridge to Nowhere") in Alaska was cited as an example of pork barrel spending. The bridge, pushed for by Republican Senator Ted Stevens, was projected to cost $398 million and would connect the island's 50 residents and the Ketchikan International Airport to Revillagigedo Island and Ketchikan.

Pork-barrel projects, which differ from earmarks, are added to the federal budget by members of the appropriation committees of the United States Congress. This allows the delivery of federal funds to the local district or state of the appropriation committee member, often accommodating major campaign contributors. To a certain extent, a member of Congress is judged by their ability to deliver funds to their constituents. The Chairman and the ranking member of the United States Senate Committee on Appropriations are in a position to deliver significant benefits to their states. Researchers Anthony Fowler and Andrew B. Hall claim that this still does not account for the high reelection rates of incumbent representatives in American legislatures. Former Hawaii Senator Daniel Inouye described himself as "the No. 1 earmarks guy in the U.S. Congress". Inouye regularly passed earmarks for funding in the state of Hawaii including military and transportation spending.

== See also ==
- Christmas tree bill
- Citizens Against Government Waste
- Clientelism
- Corporate welfare
- Earmark (politics)
- Federal Funding Accountability and Transparency Act of 2006
- Golden Fleece Award
- Government waste
- List of United States political catchphrases
- Money loop
- Patrimonialism
- People's Initiative Against Pork Barrel
- Pork barrel scam
- Porkbusters
- Spoils system
