= Federal Funding Accountability and Transparency Act of 2006 =

US government statute

- Long title: A bill to require full disclosure of all entities and organizations receiving Federal funds.
- Acronyms (colloquial): Federal Funding Accountability and Transparency Act of 2006
- Enacted by: the 109th United States Congress

Citations
- Public law: Pub. L. 109–282 (text) (PDF)
- Statutes at Large: 120 Stat. 1186

Legislative history
- Introduced in the Senate as S. 2590 by Tom Coburn (R–OK), Barack Obama (D–IL), Tom Carper (D–DE), and John McCain (R–AZ) on April 6, 2006; Committee consideration by Committee on Homeland Security and Governmental Affairs; Subcommittee on Federal Financial Management, Government Information, and International Security; Passed the Senate on September 6, 2006 (Unanimously approved); Passed the House on September 13, 2006 (Voice); Signed into law by President George W. Bush on September 26, 2006

The Federal Funding Accountability and Transparency Act of 2006 (S. 2590) is an Act of Congress that requires the full disclosure to the public of all entities or organizations receiving federal funds beginning in fiscal year (FY) 2007. The website USAspending.gov opened in December 2007 as a result of the act, and is maintained by the Office of Management and Budget. The Congressional Budget Office estimates S. 2590 will cost $15 million over its authorized time period of 2007–2011.

The bill was introduced by Senator Tom Coburn, for himself and Senators Barack Obama, Tom Carper and John McCain on April 6, 2006. After two "secret holds" placed by Senators Ted Stevens, a Republican, and Robert Byrd, a Democrat were revealed and removed, it was passed unanimously in the Senate on September 6, 2006, and by the House on September 13, 2006. The bill was signed into law by President George W. Bush on September 26, 2006.

On June 3, 2008, Senator Obama, along with Senators Carper, Coburn and McCain, introduced follow-up legislation: Strengthening Transparency and Accountability in Federal Spending Act of 2008.

== Description ==
The bill states in part:

Not later than January 1, 2008, the Office of Management and Budget shall, in accordance with this section, section 204 of the E-Government Act of 2002 (Public Law 107-347; 44 U.S.C. 3501 note), and the Office of Federal Procurement Policy Act (41 U.S.C. 403 et seq.), ensure the existence and operation of a single searchable website, accessible by the public at no cost to access, that includes for each Federal award –

(A) the name of the entity receiving the award;

(B) the amount of the award;

(C) information on the award including transaction type, funding agency, the North American Industry Classification System code or Catalog of Federal Domestic Assistance number (where applicable), program source, and an award title descriptive of the purpose of each funding action;

(D) the location of the entity receiving the award and the primary location of performance under the award, including the city, state, congressional district, and country;

(E) a unique identifier of the entity receiving the award and of the parent entity of the recipient, should the entity be owned by another entity; and

(F) any other relevant information specified by the Office of Management and Budget.

== Sponsors in the Senate ==
In addition to Coburn, Obama, and McCain, there were 43 other senators who co-sponsored this bill: Lamar Alexander, George Allen, Max Baucus, Evan Bayh, Jeff Bingaman, Barbara Boxer, Sam Brownback, Richard Burr, Maria Cantwell, Saxby Chambliss, Hillary Clinton, Norm Coleman, Susan Collins, John Cornyn, Larry Craig, Jim DeMint, Mike DeWine, Chris Dodd, Elizabeth Dole, Dick Durbin, Mike Enzi, Russ Feingold, Bill Frist, Chuck Grassley, Chuck Hagel, Johnny Isakson, John Kerry, Jon Kyl, Mary Landrieu, Joe Lieberman, Mitch McConnell, Bob Menendez, Bill Nelson, Harry Reid, Ken Salazar, Rick Santorum, Jeff Sessions, Olympia Snowe, John Sununu, Jim Talent, Craig Thomas, John Thune, David Vitter, and George Voinovich.

== Legislative history ==
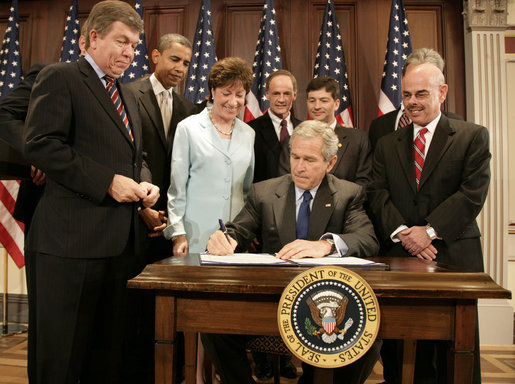
President George W. Bush signing the Federal Funding Accountability and Transparency Act of 2006 in the Eisenhower Executive Office Building on September 26, 2006.

The act had strong bipartisan support at every stage in the legislative process.

=== Senate ===
S. 2590 was introduced in the Senate on April 6, 2006, and then sent to the Committee on Homeland Security and Governmental Affairs Subcommittee on Federal Financial Management, Government Information, and International Security. Hearings were held in the subcommittee on July 18, 2006, and S. 2590 was then sent to the full committee. In the full committee hearings were held and an amendment was added on July 27, 2006. On August 2, 2006, S. 2590 was placed on legislative calendar 576. Senate Majority Leader Bill Frist announced on August 31, 2006, that he would be bringing S. 2590 to a vote in the Senate sometime in September 2006 despite any holds on the bill. On September 7, 2006, S. 2590 passed by unanimous consent in the Senate. For their bipartisan efforts in drafting the legislation and shepherding it into law, the lead staffers for Senators Coburn and Obama were recognized by The Hill newspaper as being among the top staffers on Capitol Hill.

=== House ===
S. 2590 introduced in the House on September 8, 2006. It was agreed upon and passed by voice vote five days later and S.Con.Res. 114 was agreed to and passed by both the House and the Senate on the same day.

=== "Secret hold" ===
Some time after August 2, 2006, Senators Ted Stevens, a Republican, and Robert Byrd, a Democrat, placed "secret holds" on S. 2590. Under Senate Rules, this prevents a vote on this act or its amendments without disclosure of the Senator requesting it. On August 17, 2006, Coburn identified Stevens as "the only senator blocking [the Bill]" at a Town hall meeting in Oklahoma, but this did not become widely known for nearly two weeks.

Prompted by political blogs, various individuals contacted their senators to determine if they placed the "secret hold" on S. 2590. The effort was an unusual example of bipartisan collaboration on the internet with the right-leaning blogs Porkbusters and GOPProgress actively working with left-leaning TPMmuckraker. On August 30, 2006, after he had been identified as the only suspect by Porkbusters and one of two suspects by TPMmuckraker, a spokesman for Stevens confirmed that he placed a hold. The following day, Senator Byrd (TPMmuckraker's other suspect) also admitted to placing a hold stating that he had wanted to have more time to look at the legislation; he had lifted the hold by the time of the announcement. Stevens subsequently lifted his hold.

=== Presidential action ===
President George W. Bush signed the bill into law on September 26, 2006. In attendance at the signing were the bill's author Sen. Tom Coburn, R-OK, Sen. Susan Collins, R-ME, Chairwoman of the Homeland Security and Governmental Affairs Committee, House Majority Whip Roy Blunt R-MO-7, Sen. Barack Obama, D-IL., Sen. Tom Carper, D-DE., Rep. Jeb Hensarling R-TX-5., and Rep. Henry Waxman D-CA-30.

== Sister bill in the House ==
H.R. 5060, an amendment to the Federal Financial Assistance Management Improvement Act of 1999, was passed by the House of Representatives on June 21, 2006, and sent to the Senate. H.R. 5060 can be considered a sister bill to S. 2590, but it is weaker than S. 2590 because it only considers federal grants. This bill died when S. 2590 was passed by the House and S.Con.Res. 114 was passed by the House and Senate because S. 2590 considers a superset of the actions of H.R. 5060.

== Implementation ==
The legislation delegated responsibility for creating the website to the Office of Management and Budget. Around the time of the Act's passage, OMB Watch, a government watchdog group, was developing a site that would do essentially everything the legislation required. Gary Bass, director of OMB Watch, contacted Robert Shea, associate director of the OMB, offering to help with development of the new site. Shea was initially reluctant to collaborate with Bass, in part because OMB Watch is typically critical of the OMB, but eventually it was determined that the government site would be based on what OMB Watch was developing, with the group being paid $600,000 for their technology. As of early 2008, the government's site, USASpending.gov, offers the same data, API, and (for the most part) documentation as the OMB Watch site, fedspending.org. On May 9, 2017, Steven Mnuchin, the United States Secretary of the Treasury, announced that he updated the site, providing a much broader view of government spending.

It has been reported that the 2011 United States federal budget holds a substantial reduction in funding for the Electronic Government Fund, from which USASpending.gov draws its funding.
