= Porkbusters =

Former blogger effort to cut pork barrel federal spending

Porkbusters logo.

Porkbusters was an effort led by mostly conservative and libertarian bloggers to cut pork barrel spending by the U.S. Congress used to help pay for projects.

The effort was launched on September 18, 2005, after the massive scale of the reconstruction effort necessary for the areas devastated by Hurricane Katrina had become apparent. It quickly picked up steam as blogger Glenn Reynolds (a.k.a. "Instapundit") began promoting the idea and the influential-though-anonymous blogger NZ Bear set up a website showing which members of the U.S. Congress had committed to cutting projects in their own districts to help offset the disaster recovery effort.

Reynolds encouraged his readers to send him copies of pork-cutting letters they send to their representatives and Senators, along with the responses from the elected officials. He then posted them on his website under the heading "Porkbusters Update".

In operation for less than six weeks, as of October 13, 2005 the project managed to garner $84,000,000 in specific budget cut commitments out of various Representatives and non-specific agreements out of many more. In addition, those Representatives who had been contacted and had negative responses are highlighted and their contact information was made available for their constituents.

== Coburn Amendment ==
The Porkbusters project endorsed the Coburn Amendment. Officially titled the Coburn Amendment to the Transportation, Housing, and Urban Development appropriations bill (HR 3058), the Coburn Amendment was a bill proposed by Senator Tom Coburn that would divert money from the transportation bill, specifically the $220 million for the Gravina Island Bridge in Alaska to the reconstruction of the "Twin Spans" bridge in Louisiana. The amendment was defeated 82–15.

== Next phase ==
On October 30, 2005, N.Z. Bear posted an entry to his blog entitled The Next Phase of Porkbusters. In it he said:

Porkbusters is shifting its focus from raising awareness of pork to calling attention to specific legislation that actually starts eliminating pork. The first bill that we are focusing on is sponsored by seven Senators who have styled themselves the "Fiscal Responsibility Team": Tom Coburn, Sam Brownback, Jim DeMint, John Ensign, Lindsey Graham, John McCain, and John Sununu.

In December 2005, Senator Coburn had the Porkbuster logo on his site, along with a separate page listing his Porkbuster efforts, though Porkbusters had a few setback when Senator Sununu lost his Senate seat in 2008 and when Senator McCain voted on the highly controversial Emergency Economic Stabilization Act of 2008, which is thought to have worsened their fight against pork.

In August 2006, Porkbusters, Talking Points Memo and other blogs from across the political spectrum worked together to support the proposed Obama-Coburn Federal Funding Accountability and Transparency Act of 2006 (S. 2590). "Secret holds" placed on the bill were eventually tracked down to Senators Ted Stevens and Robert Byrd. The bill became law in September 2006.
