= Darrell Issa =

American politician (born 1953)

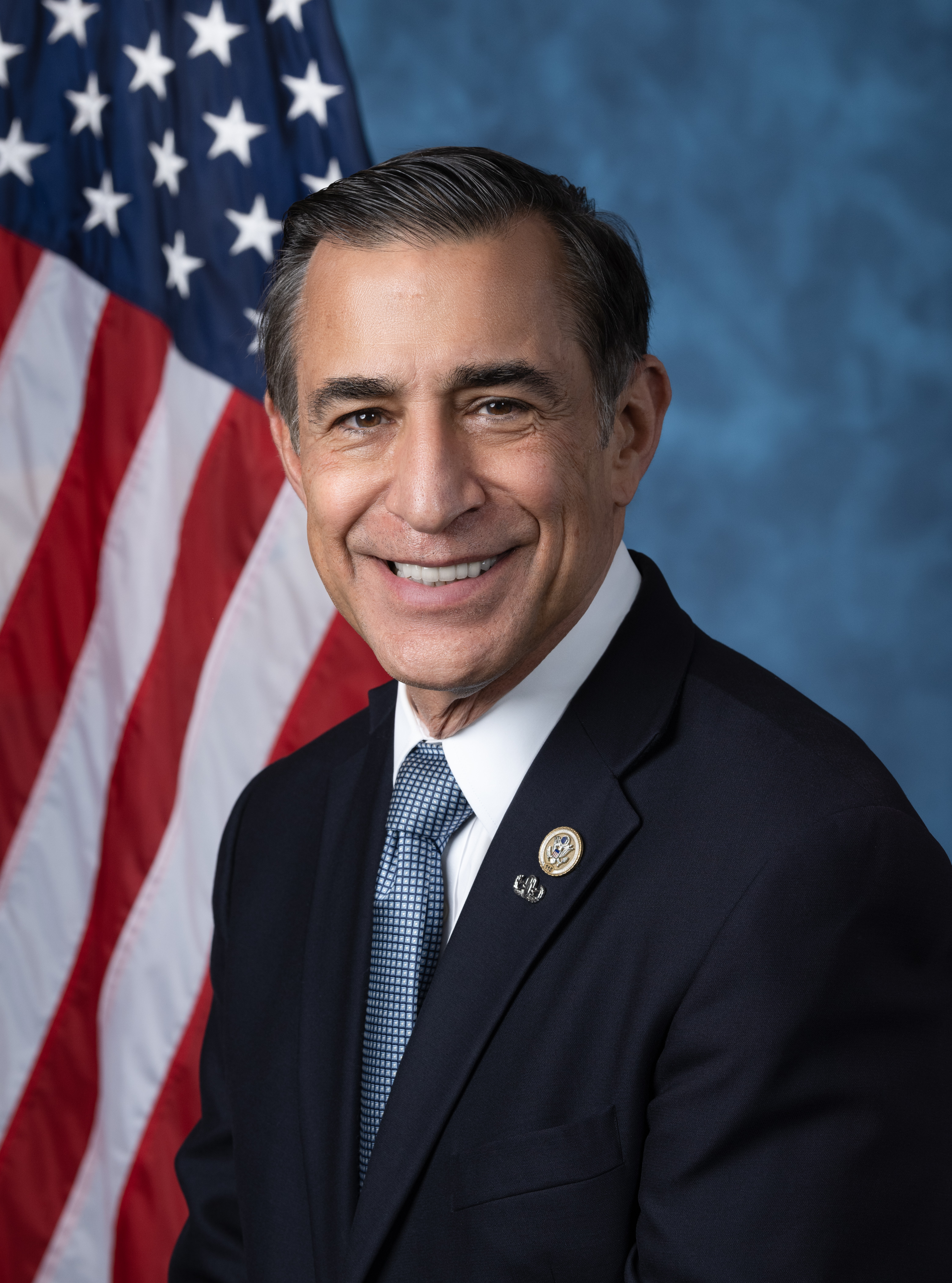
- Official portrait, 2020

Member of the U.S. House of Representatives from California
- Incumbent
- Assumed office January 3, 2021
- Preceded by: Duncan D. Hunter
- Constituency: 50th district (2021–2023); 48th district (2023–present)
- In office January 3, 2001 – January 3, 2019
- Preceded by: Ron Packard
- Succeeded by: Mike Levin
- Constituency: 48th district (2001–2003); 49th district (2003–2019)

Chair of the House Oversight Committee
- In office January 3, 2011 – January 3, 2015
- Preceded by: Edolphus Towns
- Succeeded by: Jason Chaffetz

Personal details
- Born: Darrell Edward Issa; November 1, 1953 (age 73) Cleveland, Ohio, U.S.
- Party: Republican
- Spouses: Marcia Enyart (divorced); Kathy Stanton (m. 1980; div. 2021)
- Children: 1
- Education: Kent State University, Stark (attended); Siena Heights University (BA)
- Website: House website Campaign website

Military service
- Allegiance: United States
- Branch/service: United States Army
- Years of service: 1970–1972 (active); 1976–1980 (reserve)
- Rank: Captain
- Issa's voice Issa supporting the 2013 DATA Act. Recorded November 18, 2013

Darrell Edward Issa (/ˈaɪsə/ ICE-ə; born November 1, 1953) is an American businessman and politician serving as the U.S. representative for California's 48th congressional district. He represented the 50th congressional district from 2021 to 2023. A member of the Republican Party, he previously served in the United States House of Representatives from 2001 to 2019, representing two districts primarily covering North County in the San Diego area: first the 48th district for one term and then the 49th district for eight terms. From January 2011 to January 2015, he chaired the House Oversight and Government Reform Committee.

Issa was CEO of Directed Electronics, which he co-founded in 1982. It is one of the largest makers of automobile aftermarket security and convenience products in the United States.

On January 10, 2018, Issa announced that he would not seek reelection to the House. Democrat Mike Levin was elected on November 6, 2018, to become the district's next representative. On September 19, 2018, President Donald Trump nominated Issa to be director of the United States Trade and Development Agency.

On September 26, 2019, Issa announced that he was running for California's 50th congressional district in the 2020 election. He placed second in the March top-two primary, advancing to face Democrat Ammar Campa-Najjar in the November general election. Issa defeated Campa-Najjar.

On March 6, 2026, Issa announced he would not seek re-election in 2026.

== Early life, education, and military service ==
The second of six children, Issa was born in Cleveland, Ohio, the son of Martha (née Bielfelt) and William Issa, who sold trucks and ground valves. His father was the son of Lebanese Christian immigrants, and a member of the Maronite Catholic faith. His mother is of German and Bohemian (Czech) descent and a Latter-day Saint.

During his childhood, the large family moved to a three-bedroom house in the predominantly Jewish suburb of Cleveland Heights. Many of Issa's friends were Jewish, and he reportedly worked for a rabbi at one point. He became very familiar with Jewish culture.

In 1970, on his 17th birthday, Issa dropped out of high school and enlisted in the Army. He became an Explosive Ordnance Disposal (EOD) technician assigned to the 145th Ordnance Detachment. Trained to defuse bombs, Issa has said that his unit provided security for President Richard Nixon, sweeping stadiums for bombs before games in the 1971 World Series. A May 1998 investigation by Lance Williams of the San Francisco Examiner found that Nixon had not attended any 1971 World Series games, but that Issa's unit did perform security sweeps during the series. First Lady Pat Nixon was present at Game 2 of the series, where she threw the first pitch. After the series, Issa was transferred to a supply depot, a result of receiving poor ratings.

Issa received a hardship discharge from the Army in 1972 after his father suffered a heart attack. After that, he earned a General Educational Development (GED) certificate.

Twice that year, Issa was arrested. In the first incident, a grand jury indicted him for theft of a Maserati, in a complex scheme with his brother William, but prosecutors dropped the charge. In the second incident, he was stopped for driving the wrong way on a one-way street, and a police officer noticed a firearm in his car's glove compartment; Issa was charged with carrying a concealed weapon. He pleaded guilty to possession of an unregistered firearm and was sentenced to six months' probation and a small fine. Issa has said he believes the record has since been expunged.

Issa majored in business administration at Siena Heights University, a small Roman Catholic college in Adrian, Michigan, completing his degree at the Stark campus of Kent State University. While at Kent State, he enrolled in the Reserve Officer Training Corps; at graduation he was commissioned as a second lieutenant.

Issa served in the Army Reserve from 1976 to 1980, and was promoted to captain. From September 9 to 26, 1980, Issa served on active duty while training with the 1/77th Armor Battalion as an Assistant S-1. His evaluation report, by then-Lt. Col. Wesley Clark, read, "This officer's performance far exceeded that of any other reserve officer who has worked in the battalion" and "Promote ahead of contemporaries. Unlimited potential."

Shortly before his discharge from the Army in 1980, Issa was again indicted for grand theft auto. The prosecution dropped the case in August 1980. In 1981, Issa was in a car crash. The other motorist sued him for $20,000; they eventually settled out of court for an undisclosed amount.

== Business career ==
=== Quantum Enterprises and Steal Stopper ===
After leaving the military, Issa and his second wife, Kathy Stanton, returned to the Cleveland area. According to Issa, he and his wife pooled their savings, sold their cars (a 1976 Mercedes and a 1967 VW Beetle) and a BMW motorcycle, and borrowed $50,000 from family members to invest in Quantum Enterprises, an electronics manufacturer run by a friend from Cleveland Heights. It assembled bug zappers, CB radio parts, and other consumer products for other companies. One of those clients, car alarm manufacturer Steal Stopper, became the path to Issa's fortune. It was struggling badly, and he took control of it by foreclosing a $60,000 loan he had made to it when its founder, Joey Adkins, missed a payment. Adkins remained as an employee.

Issa soon turned Steal Stopper around, to the point that it was supplying Ford with thousands of car alarms and negotiating a similar deal with Toyota. Early in the morning of September 7, 1982, Quantum and Steal Stopper's offices and factory in the Cleveland suburb of Maple Heights caught fire. The fire took three hours to put out. The buildings and almost all the inventory within were destroyed. An investigation of the fire noted "suspicious burn patterns" with fires starting in two places aided by an accelerant such as gasoline.

Adkins said Issa had appeared to prepare for a fire by increasing the fire insurance policy by 462% three weeks earlier, and by removing computer equipment containing accounting and customer information. St. Paul Insurance, suspicious of arson and insurance fraud, initially paid only $25,000, according to Issa.

=== Directed Electronics ===
Steal Stopper soon returned a profit again. As car theft rose in the U.S. during the 1980s, so did the demand for security devices. Rolls-Royce, BMW, and General Motors joined Ford, and Toyota as customers of Steal Stopper. In 1985, Issa sold the company to a California-based maker of home alarms, and moved to the San Diego suburb of Vista, to work for the company.

Shortly afterward, Issa left to start Directed Electronics, Inc. (DEI). He has continued to live in Vista. Issa used his knowledge of the weaknesses in automotive security to develop effective theft deterrents. Using sensors that, when armed, would detect motion and pressure on the car's body, his device made loud noise to draw attention to a would-be car thief, such as the car's horn honking or a speaker playing a recording with Issa's voice saying: "Protected by Viper. Stand back" and "Please step away from the car", warnings for DEI's signature product, the Viper car alarm. Sales grew from $1 million in the company's first year to $14 million by 1989.

=== Greene Properties ===
Issa is partner in 17 limited partnerships and limited liability companies (LLCs) that own commercial properties across North San Diego County. He is CEO of Greene Properties, Inc., a privately held real estate investment company with commercial real estate holdings in San Diego North County. Headquartered in Vista, it manages three commercial office buildings in Carlsbad with a total of 26,354 square feet.

== Early political career ==
=== Activism ===
Active in consumer-electronics trade organizations, Issa became more directly involved in politics. He went to Washington, D.C., to lobby Congress and later became one of California's biggest individual campaign contributors to Republican candidates. In 1996, he chaired the successful campaign to pass California Proposition 209, a ballot initiative that prohibited Californian public institutions from considering race, sex, or ethnicity in public employment, public contracting, or public education. He was instrumental in persuading the national Republican Party to hold its 1996 convention in San Diego.

=== 1998 U.S. Senate election ===
Issa's first campaign for elected office was in 1998, when he sought the Republican nomination for United States Senate to face incumbent Democrat Barbara Boxer. He spent $10 million of his own money in the primary, running against California State Treasurer Matt Fong, Congressman Frank Riggs, and three others. Fong's campaign raised $3 million from contributions and complained that Issa's wealth made for an uneven playing field (Issa received only $400,000 in contributions from others). An Issa spokesman countered that the money was needed to compensate for Fong's statewide name recognition. Issa lost to Fong, 45% to 40%; Riggs got 10% of the vote. A San Francisco exit poll suggested large numbers of Asian Americans, who typically vote in the Democratic primary, had crossed party lines to strategically vote for Fong.

== U.S. House of Representatives ==
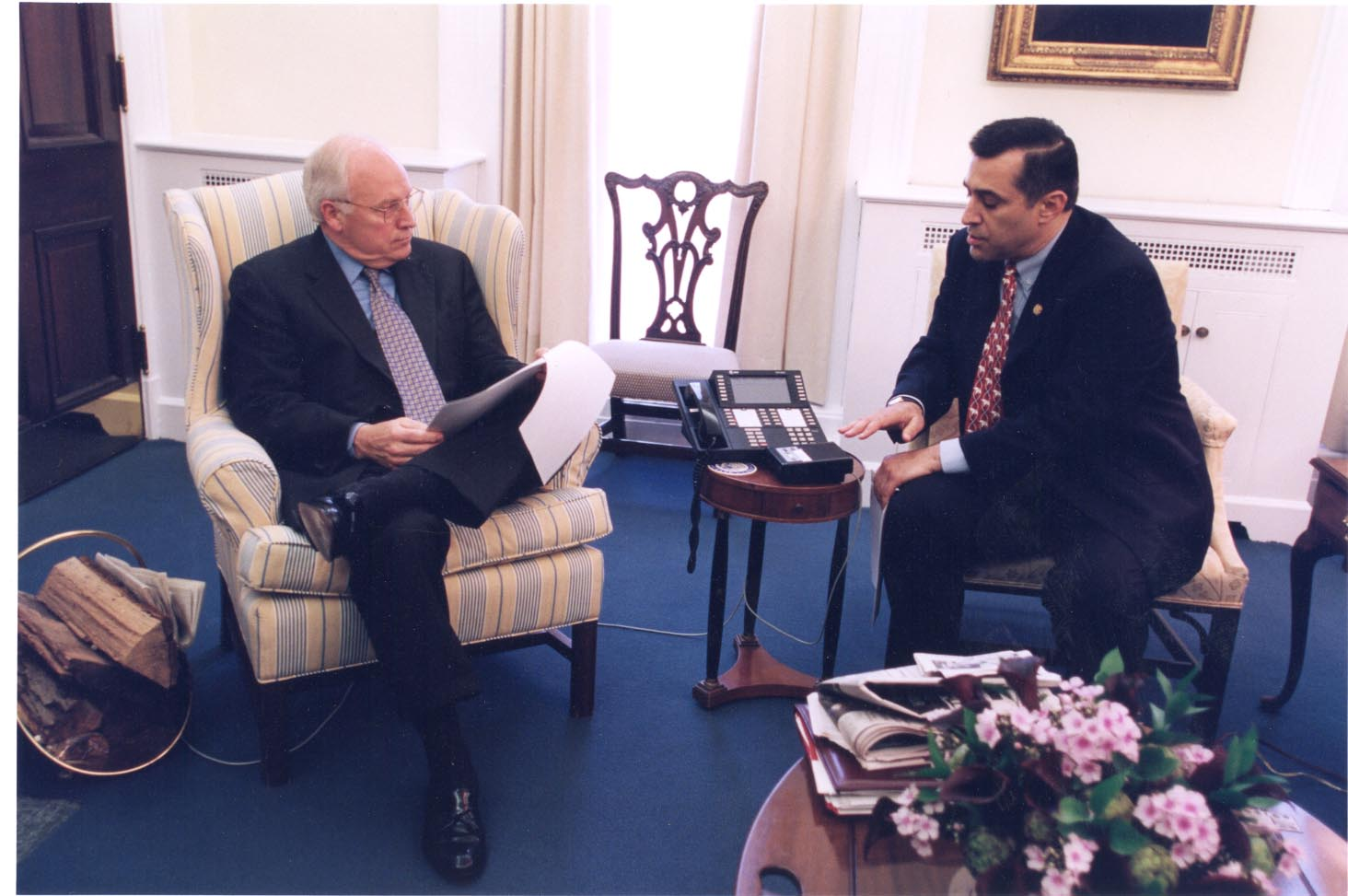
Issa with Vice President Dick Cheney in 2001

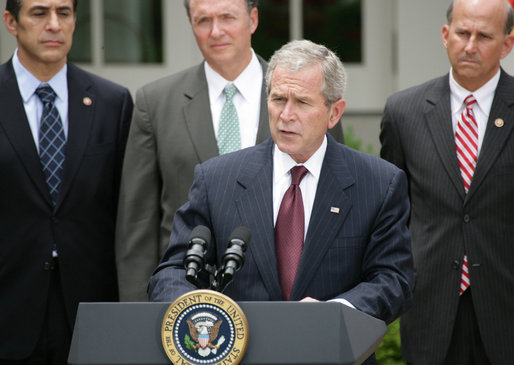
Issa and fellow Republican congressmen Dan Lungren and Louie Gohmert watch President George W. Bush deliver remarks before signing the FISA Amendments Act of 2008

=== Elections ===
==== 2000 ====
When nine-term incumbent Republican U.S. Congressman Ron Packard did not run for reelection in 2000, in California's 48th congressional district. Issa ran for the seat, capitalizing on his name recognition from the 1998 Senate race. The district was primarily based in northern San Diego County, but had small portions in Riverside and Orange counties. Issa finished first in the all-party primary with 35% of the vote, winning a plurality in all three counties; Republican state senator Bill Morrow was second, with 24% of the votes. Issa won the November general election, defeating Democratic nominee Peter Kouvelis 61%–28%.

==== 2002 ====
After redistricting, Issa's district was renumbered the 49th and lost its share of Orange County. Like its predecessor, the district was still overwhelmingly Republican; it had a Cook Partisan Voting Index (PVI) of R+10. No Democrat filed against Issa that year. He was reelected, defeating Libertarian nominee Karl Dietrich, 77%–22%.

==== 2004 ====
A write-in candidate from the 2002 election, Mike Byron, became the Democratic challenger in 2004. Issa was reelected to a third term, defeating Byron 63%–35%.

==== 2006 ====
Issa was reelected to a fourth term, defeating Democratic nominee Jeeni Criscenzo, 63%–33%. He was one of four Middle Eastern American members in that Congress. He has said that he identified primarily as Lebanese, not as pan-Arab.

==== 2008 ====
Issa was reelected to a fifth term, defeating Democratic nominee Robert Hamilton, 58%–37%. The 21-point margin of victory was the second smallest in Issa's career. He carried San Diego with 60% of the vote and Riverside with 57% of the vote.

==== 2010 ====
Issa was reelected to a sixth term, defeating Democratic nominee Howard Katz, 63%–31%.

==== 2012 ====
After the 2010 census, Issa's district was renumbered the 49th and made significantly more compact. It lost its share of Riverside County, along with most of its share of San Diego County. It gained a small portion of southern Orange County, including San Clemente, San Juan Capistrano, Dana Point, and part of Laguna Niguel. The district was more competitive on paper than its predecessor. The old 49th had a PVI of R+10, while the new 49th has a PVI of R+4.

Issa was reelected to a seventh term, defeating Democratic nominee Jerry Tetalman, 58%–42%. The 16-point margin of victory was the smallest in Issa's political career. Issa carried the San Diego portion of his district with 55% of the vote and the Orange County part with 66%.

==== 2014 ====
The June open primary was contested by Issa and two Democrats: Dave Peiser and Noboru Isaga. The top two vote-getters, Issa (62%) and Peiser (28%), advanced to the general election. Issa was elected to an eighth term, 60% to 40%.

==== 2016 ====
In the June open primary, Issa received 51% of the vote to 46% for Democrat Doug Applegate, a retired Marine colonel. Issa and Applegate advanced to the general election in November. In October, Applegate and Issa were ranked by the Cook Political Report as equally likely to win.

Issa sent out a campaign mailer that featured a photograph of President Barack Obama signing a law. The mailer said that Issa was "very pleased" that Obama signed the Sexual Assault Survivors' Rights Act, which Issa had co-sponsored.

Unusually, President Obama responded to this late campaign mailer by saying that Issa's "primary contribution to the U.S. Congress has been to obstruct and to waste taxpayer dollars on trumped up investigations that have led nowhere." Obama said that, because of fading support for Donald Trump, Issa was promoting his cooperation with the president although he had previously accused Obama of corruption.

Issa said, "I've worked with the administration on good legislation where it was possible, called out wrongdoing wherever I saw it and will continue to do so."

On November 23, 2016, Issa held a 3,234-vote lead with approximately 6,000 ballots still uncounted. He declared victory, but Applegate had not conceded. The Associated Press finally declared Issa the winner on November 28, citing a small but convincing lead with only a few votes left to count.

==== 2018 ====
Multiple Democrats, including Applegate and environmental attorney Mike Levin, launched campaigns for California's 49th district seat. Given the close margin in 2016, the election was expected to be highly competitive. For months, Issa's Vista office was the site of weekly protests. Hundreds of people gathered to protest against Trump and his agenda and actions. At a May rally, 800 people showed up to protest the House vote to repeal and replace the Affordable Care Act (Obamacare). On January 10, 2018, Issa announced that he would not run for reelection. Democrat Mike Levin won the seat.

==== 2020 ====
On September 26, 2019, Issa announced that he was running for California's 50th congressional district in the 2020 election. The incumbent at that time was fellow Republican Duncan D. Hunter, who was then under indictment. In December 2019, Hunter pleaded guilty to campaign finance violations and resigned from Congress effective January 13, 2020, leaving the seat vacant.

In redistricting, the 50th district had absorbed much of Issa's former base in the more Republican inland portion of San Diego County. Issa placed second in the March 3, 2020, blanket primary and beat Democratic challenger Ammar Campa-Najjar by nearly 30,000 votes in the general election. Issa said he could switch districts because he owns his mother's home in Bonsall. He has long lived in Vista, where he has raised his family.

=== Tenure ===
==== Oversight committee ====
After the 2010 elections, Issa became chair of the House Committee on Oversight and Government Reform. He was a vocal advocate for investigations into the Obama administration, including the Troubled Asset Relief Program, the Financial Crisis Inquiry Commission, corruption in Afghanistan, WikiLeaks, and the Food and Drug Administration, among other topics. In 2010 he told the press that he wanted the committee to hold investigative hearings "seven hearings a week, times 40 weeks."

In February 2011, inewsource (then the Watchdog Institute), a nonprofit investigative reporting center based at San Diego State University, published an investigation alleging that as leader of the committee, Issa built a team that included staff members with close connections to industries that could benefit from his investigations.

On February 16, 2012, the committee held a hearing on the Department of Health and Human Services's regulation requiring insurance plans to cover birth control, which Issa said would violate the religious freedom of people who oppose the use of birth control. Democratic members submitted attorney and activist Sandra Fluke as a witness for promoting women's health, but Issa did not permit her to testify, saying her name was submitted too late, a claim Democrats challenged.

==== Legislation ====
In 2013 Issa introduced the Digital Accountability and Transparency Act of 2013 (H.R. 2061; 113th Congress). H.R. 2061 aimed to make information on federal expenditures more easily available, accessible, and transparent. President Obama signed the bill into law on May 9, 2014.

Issa introduced the FOIA Oversight and Implementation Act of 2014 (H.R. 1211; 113th Congress) on March 15, 2013, a bill to amend the Freedom of Information Act in order to make it easier and faster to request and receive information. The bill would have required the Office of Management and Budget to create a single FOIA website for people to use to make FOIA requests and check on the status of their request. It would also have created a Chief FOIA Officers Council charged with reviewing compliance and recommending improvements, and required the federal agency to release the information it disclosed to the person who requested it publicly afterward.

Issa argued in favor of the bill because it "shifts the burden of proof from the public requestor seeking information about a government agency...to the government being open and transparent unless it has a good reason to withhold." The bill passed the House unanimously on February 25, 2014, but a nearly identical Senate bill failed when it was tabled by House Speaker John Boehner.

Issa introduced the Federal Information Technology Acquisition Reform Act (H.R. 1232; 113th Congress) on March 18, 2013, to make changes and reforms to the framework that manages how the federal government buys new technology. One of the requirements would be that the government develop a streamlined plan for its acquisitions. The bill would increase the power of federal agencies' chief information officers (CIOs) so that they could be more effective.

Each agency would also be limited to having only one CIO, who would be responsible for the successes and failures of the agency's IT projects. The bill would also require the federal government to make use of private-sector best practices. The bill was intended to reduce IT procurement-related waste. It passed the House in a voice vote on February 25, 2014. In December 2014 it passed as a section of the National Defense Authorization Act for Fiscal Year 2015. Issa also introduced and co-sponsored The Federal Information Security Modernization Act of 2014 (Pub.L. 113–283, S. 2521; commonly referred to as FISMA Reform), which Obama signed into law on December 18, 2014.

On May 7, 2014, Issa introduced a simple resolution in the House (which passed 231 - 187): Recommending that the House of Representatives find Lois G. Lerner, former Director, Exempt Organizations, Internal Revenue Service, in contempt of Congress for refusal to comply with a subpoena duly issued by the Committee on Oversight and Government Reform. The resolution holds Lois Lerner, one of the central Internal Revenue Service officials involved in the 2013 IRS targeting controversy, in contempt of Congress for her refusal to testify about the scandal before Issa's committee in response to a subpoena.

In July 2017, Issa introduced the CLASSICS Act to Congress in a bipartisan effort to empower artists by collecting royalties for the preceding three-year period and also by ensuring their creative rights remain in force for pre-1972 recordings just as newer artists are guaranteed by current legislation. Issa has been a consistent cosponsor of the Fair Play Fair Pay Act as well; granting radio performance rights for musicians and record producers.

=== Bombing plot ===
In 2001, Issa's San Clemente district office was targeted in an aborted bombing plot. Jewish Defense League leader Irving Rubin was arrested along with Earl Krugel in connection with the plot, which reportedly had focused on other targets before shifting to Issa's office. Issa speculated that the cause of the incident may have been a column written by political commentator Debbie Schlussel in which she charged that Issa sympathized with Hezbollah despite its being listed by the U.S. government as a terrorist organization, charges he denied.

=== Ethics complaints and 2010 award ===
In September 2011, a liberal advocacy and lobbying group, American Family Voices, filed a complaint with the Office of Congressional Ethics against Issa, alleging he had repeatedly used his position of authority on the Oversight Committee to improperly intervene in dealings with Goldman Sachs, Merrill Lynch, and DEI Holdings, all of which Issa is associated with in some way. Issa's office rejected the allegations.

The year before, the Project on Government Oversight, a government watchdog group, gave Issa its Good Government Award for his contributions to government oversight and transparency. These included publicizing documents produced by the New York Federal Reserve Bank in response to a congressional subpoena, publicly exposing the NYFR's secret "back-door bailout" of AIG's counterparties, and cofounding a Transparency Caucus dedicated to "promoting a more open and accountable government through education, legislation, and oversight." In 2012 Issa featured in TechCrunch's list of "The 20 Most Innovative People in Democracy."

In late February 2021, Issa and a dozen other Republican House members skipped votes and enlisted others to vote for them, citing the ongoing COVID-19 pandemic, while actually attending the Conservative Political Action Conference, which was held at the same time as their slated absences. In response, the Campaign for Accountability, an ethics watchdog group, filed a complaint with the House Committee on Ethics and requested an investigation into Issa and the other lawmakers.

=== Committee assignments ===
For the 119th Congress:

- Committee on Foreign Affairs
  - Subcommittee on the Middle East and North Africa
  - Subcommittee on Oversight and Accountability
- Committee on Science, Space, and Technology
  - Subcommittee on Investigations and Oversight
  - Subcommittee on Research and Technology
- Committee on the Judiciary
  - Subcommittee on Courts, Intellectual Property, and the Internet (chairman)
  - Subcommittee on the Administrative State, Regulatory Reform, and Antitrust

=== Caucus memberships ===
- Congressional Constitution Caucus
- Congressional NextGen 9-1-1 Caucus
- Climate Solutions Caucus
- Congressional Armenian Caucus
- Republican Study Committee
- Congressional Western Caucus

== Political positions ==
=== Abortion ===
As of 2026, Issa has an A+ "Pro-Life Scorecard" from the Susan B. Anthony Pro-Life America for voting against abortion in his 2021–2026 tenure (it does not list his votes in 2001–2019). He supported the overturning of Roe v. Wade, calling the day the decision was made a "great day for the cause and principle of life."

=== 2003 California gubernatorial recall election ===
Issa came to national prominence in 2003 when he contributed more than $1.6 million to help fund a signature-gathering drive for the petition to recall California Governor Gray Davis. At the time he made the contribution, it was widely believed that Issa intended to run to replace Davis. But after fellow Republican Arnold Schwarzenegger entered the race two days before the filing deadline, Issa announced that he would not run. He later said his mission had been accomplished with Davis's recall and that he wanted to continue to represent his district in Congress and work toward Middle East peace. At one point in the campaign he suggested people should vote against recalling Davis unless one of the two leading Republican contenders dropped out, concerned that Schwarzenegger and fellow Republican Tom McClintock would split votes, resulting in Democratic lieutenant governor Cruz Bustamante's election. Issa endorsed Schwarzenegger, who won the governorship when Davis was recalled.

=== Donald Trump ===
Issa attracted attention for his close relationship with and strong support for Donald Trump during the 2016 presidential election. He endorsed Trump in March 2016. When the Donald Trump Access Hollywood tape surfaced, Issa condemned Trump's remarks but did not rescind his endorsement.

In early February 2017, Issa expressed his support for a special prosecutor to look into Trump's ties to Russia. On February 27, he walked back his previous comments. Issa supported Trump's dismissal of FBI Director James Comey, saying "Comey had lost my confidence long ago."

Issa said he believed Russia meddled with the 2016 election, but he supported Trump's firing of Comey (who was leading the investigation into the meddling) and that said the U.S. should focus on other issues.

On January 7, 2021, after Trump supporters stormed the U.S. Capitol building, Issa voted to reject the certification of Pennsylvania's electoral votes in the 2020 presidential election. He voted against impeaching Trump on an article of impeachment for "incitement of insurrection" in the aftermath of the attack on the Capitol. In May 2021, Issa voted against the creation of an independent commission to investigate the January 6 attack.

=== Environment ===
Before the 2010 election, Issa pledged that, if elected, he would probe "Climategate", which refers to the hacked Climatic Research Unit emails that climate change denialists falsely asserted showed scientific misconduct and fraud by climate scientists. He called Obama's unwillingness to investigate Climategate "unconscionable" and an abdication of responsibility.

=== Foreign and defense policy ===
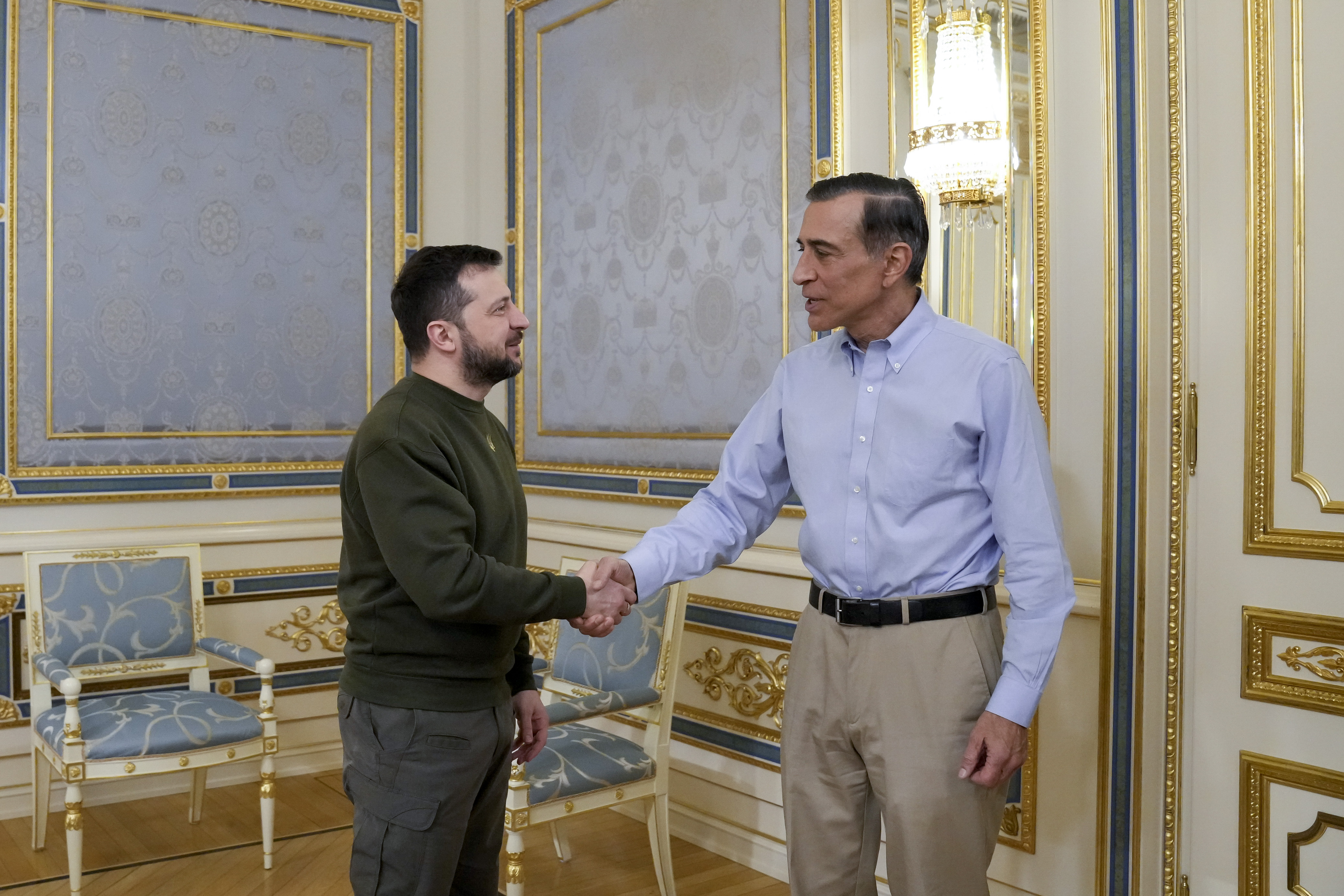
Issa greeting Ukrainian president Volodymyr Zelenskyy in February 2023

In 2001, Issa voted for the authorization of the PATRIOT Act and the creation of the Department of Homeland Security. He voted to reauthorize the Patriot Act in 2005 after successfully amending it to require judicial notification, reporting requirements, and facts justifying the use of roving surveillance at new facilities or places.

Issa is one of several Lebanese Americans in Congress. He had a significant role in U.S. peace initiatives in the Middle East. He traveled to Lebanon and Syria in an effort to negotiate the end of the Syrian occupation of Lebanon. In 2003, he appeared at a Washington rally by Iranian groups protesting against the Islamist government in Iran.

In March 2015, Issa supported the Saudi-led intervention in the Yemeni civil war, saying, "We must make it clear that we will support our allies and punish our enemies through steadfast resolve and decisive action."

In June 2021, Issa was one of 49 House Republicans to vote to repeal the Authorization for Use of Military Force Against Iraq Resolution of 2002 (AUMF) against Iraq.

=== Health care ===
Issa favors repealing the Patient Protection and Affordable Care Act (Obamacare), and voted in support of the budget resolution to repeal it in January 2017.

On May 4, 2017, Issa voted to repeal Obamacare and pass the American Health Care Act of 2017.

An organization called Save My Care spent $500,000 to release a series of attack ads against 24 House members who voted for the AHCA, including one about Issa.

=== Israel ===
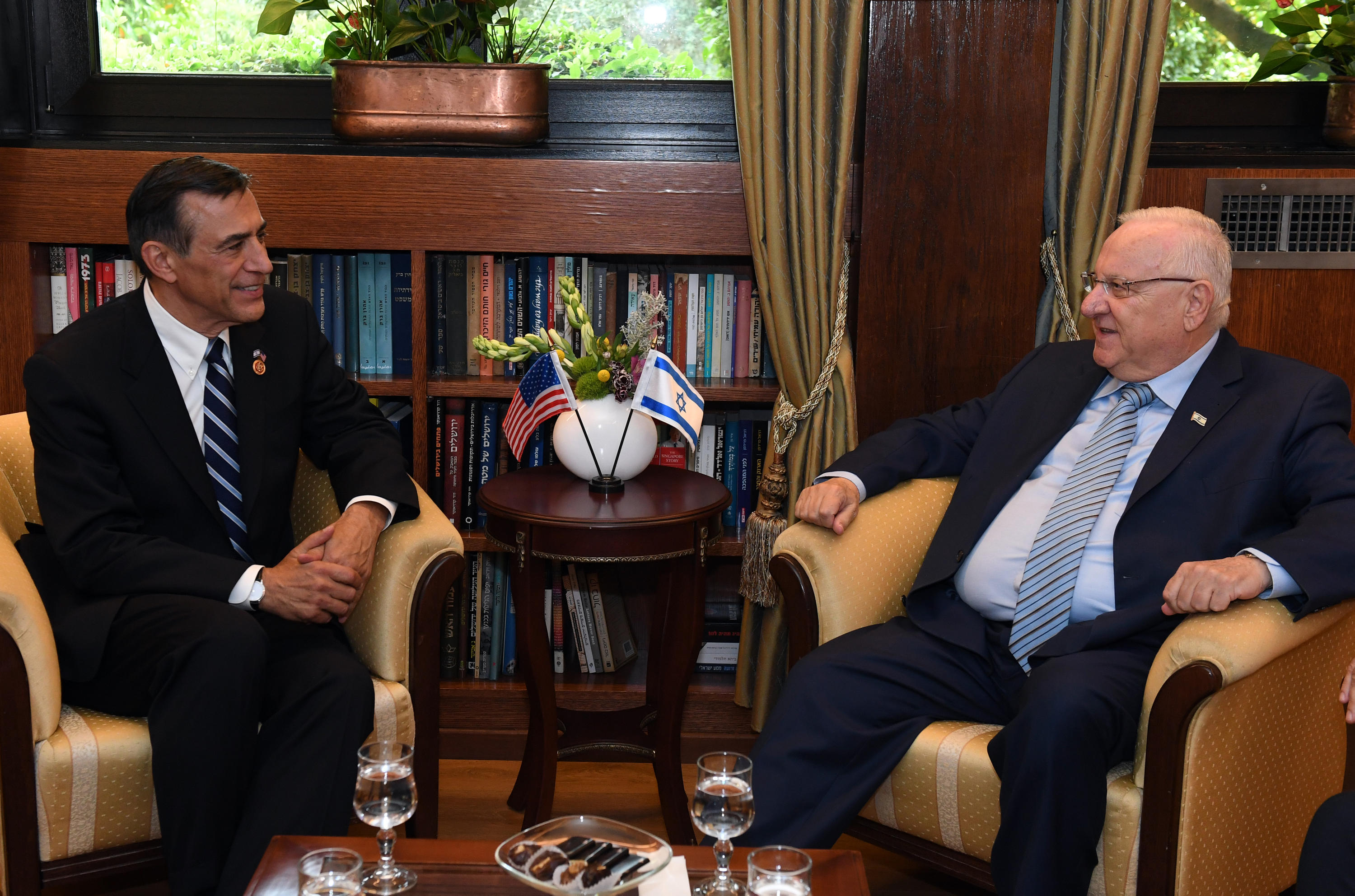
Issa with Israeli president Reuven Rivlin in May 2018

In 2023, he voted for a resolution stating support for Israel in the Gaza war launched by Hamas.

=== LGBT rights ===
On July 19, 2022, Issa and 46 other Republican Representatives voted for the Respect for Marriage Act, which would codify the right to same-sex marriage in federal law.

=== Science ===
Issa supports embryonic stem cell research and has voted to allow it.

He co-sponsored both the 2008 and 2009 versions of the Fair Copyright in Research Works Act and sponsored the Research Works Act (H.R. 3699) introduced in 2011, all of which aim at a reversal of the NIH's Public Access Policy, which mandates open access to NIH-funded research.

=== Tax reform ===
Issa voted against the Tax Cuts and Jobs Act of 2017. He was one of two California Republicans to vote against the bill, alongside Dana Rohrabacher. Issa expressed concern that "many" of his constituents would face increased taxes under the proposal and that "Californians have entrusted me to fight for them. I will not make the incredible tax burden they already endure even worse."

=== Technology ===
Issa opposed the Stop Online Piracy Act because of the amount of discretion it would give the Department of Justice. In September 2026, Issa introduced legislation to require internet service providers, domain name resolution services, and virtual private networks to block piracy websites.

== Personal life ==
In the 1970s, Issa married his high-school sweetheart, Marcia Enyart. They eventually divorced. After he left the military, Issa married Kathy Stanton. The two met while neighbors, when Stanton locked her keys inside her apartment and Issa climbed up the balcony to get into her apartment. They were married in 1980 and had one son. In July 2018, he filed for divorce from Kathy, and their divorce became final in March 2021.

With a net worth of approximately $460 million, Issa was the wealthiest serving member of Congress as of 2023.

== See also ==
- 2001 Jewish Defense League plot in California
- List of Arab and Middle Eastern Americans in the United States Congress
- List of richest American politicians

U.S. House of Representatives
Preceded by Ron Packard	Member of the U.S. House of Representatives from California's 48th congressional district 2001–2003	Succeeded by Christopher Cox
Preceded by Susan Davis	Member of the U.S. House of Representatives from California's 49th congressional district 2003–2019	Succeeded by Mike Levin
Preceded by Tom Davis	Ranking Member of the House Oversight Committee; 2009–2011	Succeeded by Elijah Cummings
Preceded by Edolphus Towns	Chair of the House Oversight Committee; 2011–2015	Succeeded by Jason Chaffetz
Preceded by Duncan D. Hunter	Member of the U.S. House of Representatives from California's 50th congressional district 2021–2023	Succeeded by Scott Peters
Preceded by Michelle Steel	Member of the U.S. House of Representatives from California's 48th congressional district 2023–present	Incumbent
U.S. order of precedence (ceremonial)
Preceded by Mike Turner	United States representatives by seniority 43rd	Succeeded by Emanuel Cleaver
Preceded by John Carter	Order of precedence of the United States	Succeeded by Linda Sánchez
