= Finding Lois Lerner in contempt of Congress =

US House resolution

- Long title: Recommending that the House of Representatives find Lois G. Lerner, former Director, Exempt Organizations, Internal Revenue Service, in contempt of Congress for refusal to comply with a subpoena duly issued by the Committee on Oversight and Government Reform.
- Announced in: the 113th United States Congress
- Sponsored by: Rep. Darrell Issa (R-CA)

Legislative history
- Introduced in the House as H.Res. 574 by Rep. Darrell Issa (R-CA) on May 7, 2014; Passed the House on May 7, 2014 (Roll Call Vote 203: 231-187)

H.Res. 574, officially titled Recommending that the House of Representatives find Lois G. Lerner, Former Director, Exempt Organizations, Internal Revenue Service, in contempt of Congress for refusal to comply with a subpoena duly issued by the Committee on Oversight and Government Reform, was a simple resolution that passed in the United States House of Representatives during the 113th United States Congress. The resolution was in response to the testimony of Lois Lerner, a former Internal Revenue Service (IRS) employee, who was at the center of the then-ongoing 2013 IRS controversy over the agency's targeting of selected political groups applying for tax-exempt status. The resolution held Lerner in contempt of Congress for refusing to testify at a congressional hearing.

== Background ==
In 2013, the IRS revealed that it had selected political groups applying for tax-exempt status for closer scrutiny based on their names or political themes. This disclosure led to wide condemnation of the agency and triggered several investigations, including a Federal Bureau of Investigation (FBI) criminal probe ordered by United States Attorney General Eric Holder. Initial reports described the selections as nearly exclusively of conservative groups with terms such as "Tea Party" in their names. Further investigation revealed that liberal-leaning groups and the Occupy movement had also triggered additional scrutiny, but not at nearly the same rate as conservative groups. The only denial of tax-exempt status by the IRS was to a progressive group. The use of target lists continued through May 2013.

In early May 2013, the Treasury Inspector General for Tax Administration released an audit report confirming that the IRS used inappropriate criteria to identify potential political cases, including organizations with the term "tea party" in their names.

On May 10, 2013, in advance of the public release of the audit findings, director of the IRS Exempt Organizations division Lois Lerner answered what was later revealed to be a planted question by stating that the IRS was "apologetic" for what she termed "absolutely inappropriate" actions. (Lerner's superior, then-Acting IRS Commissioner Steven Miller, later testified to Congress that he had discussed with Lerner how she was to make the revelation and apology, using a planted question at a meeting of the American Bar Association rather than during an appearance two days earlier before the United States House Committee on Ways and Means in Congress.) Lerner asserted that the extra scrutiny had not been centrally planned, and had been done by lower-level "front line people" in the Cincinnati office. Media reports soon revealed that IRS officials in two other regional offices had also been involved in scrutinizing conservative groups and that selected applicants said that they had been told their applications were being overseen by a task force in Washington, D.C. The Treasury Inspector General for Tax Administration report showed that Lerner herself had been informed of the affair at a meeting that she had attended on June 29, 2011.

Following the Inspector General's report, the United States House Committee on Oversight and Government Reform began an investigation into the IRS. Additionally, the House Committee on Ways and Means expanded its ongoing 2011 investigation into IRS political targeting to include the BOLO keyword targeting allegations.

On May 22, 2013, in an opening statement to the House committee chaired by Representative Darrell Issa, Lerner stated: "I have not broken any laws. I have not violated any IRS rules or regulations. And I have not provided false information to this or any other congressional committee." Lerner then invoked her Fifth Amendment right against compelled testimony and refused to testify. Issa later asserted that Lerner had waived her Fifth Amendment rights by giving partial testimony, and that he intended to call her back into the hearings. Congressman Trey Gowdy agreed with Issa. Gowdy stated: "She [Lois Lerner] just waived her Fifth Amendment right. You don't get to tell your side of the story and then not be subjected to cross examination — that's not the way it works. She waived her right to Fifth Amendment privilege by issuing an opening statement. She ought to stand here and answer our questions."

Law professor James Joseph Duane told New York magazine that Gowdy's assertion was "extremely imaginative" but "mistaken", because a person who is involuntarily summoned before a grand jury or a legislative body may selectively invoke the right to silence. Law professor Alan Dershowitz took a different view, arguing: "You can't simply make statements about a subject and then plead the Fifth in response to questions about the very same subject", and asserting, "[o]nce you open the door to an area of inquiry, you have waived your Fifth Amendment right."

Lawmakers called for the resignation of Lois Lerner, who ran the IRS's section on tax-exempt organizations, as did Danny Werfel, after he was appointed Acting IRS Commissioner following Miller's resignation. When Lerner refused to resign, she was placed on administrative leave. Lerner retired effective September 23, 2013.

== Provisions of the resolution ==
This summary is based largely on the summary provided by the Congressional Research Service, a public domain source.

The resolution resolves that Lois G. Lerner, former director, Exempt Organizations, Internal Revenue Service (IRS), be found in contempt of Congress for failure to testify before the House Committee on Oversight and Government Reform as required by a congressional subpoena.

The resolution directs the Speaker of the House of Representatives to certify the committee's report detailing the refusal of Lerner to testify before the committee as directed by the subpoena to the U.S. Attorney for the District of Columbia to the end that Lerner be proceeded against in the manner and form provided by law, and to otherwise take all appropriate action to enforce the subpoena.

== Procedural history ==
H.Res. 574 was introduced into the United States House of Representatives on May 7, 2014, by Rep. Darrell Issa (R-CA). The provision was considered on May 7, 2014, and was passed in Roll Call Vote 203 with a vote of 231-187. All of the Republicans voted in favor of the resolution, along with six Democrats. The six Democrats who voted in favor were: Ron Barber (AZ), John Barrow (GA), Collin Peterson (MN), Mike McIntyre (NC), Nick Rahall (WV), and Patrick Murphy (FL). Seven Republicans and six Democrats were not present to vote.

The Justice Department later determined that Lerner had not waived her Fifth Amendment rights and declined to seek an indictment on the charge.

== Debate and discussion ==
House Democrats argued that Lerner had properly invoked her Fifth Amendment rights, and that she therefore was not in contempt of Congress.

The House Committee on Oversight and Government Reform previously voted in a straight party vote with all Republicans in favor and all Democrats opposed to the conclusion that Lerner had given up her Fifth Amendment right not to testify because she had given the committee an opening statement at the hearing.
