= Instapundit =

American blog launched in 2001

- Website type: warblog
- Creator: Glenn Reynolds
- Website: instapundit.com
- Launched: August 2001; 25 years ago

Instapundit is a conservative blog maintained by Glenn Reynolds, a law professor at the University of Tennessee.

== History and characteristics ==
InstaPundit was launched in August 2001 as an experiment, and a part of Reynolds' class on Internet law. After the September 11 attacks, the site quickly became a highly popular blog – with Reynolds celebrated as "chief among the warbloggers" – and was dubbed the "Grand Central Station of Bloggerville" in 2002 and reported to be "the most visited [blog] in the world" in early 2004. A 2007 memo from the National Republican Senatorial Committee described Reynolds as one of the five "best-read national conservative bloggers."

Common topics are politics, technology (such as nanotechnology), space exploration, human longevity, digital photography, individual liberty and gun politics, domestic policy, the media, and the blogosphere as a social phenomenon. Instapundit frequently discussed the war on terror from a supportive-but-critical viewpoint. Reynolds has also lent his support to the Porkbusters campaign, which purports to expose misallocation of federal funds.

In June 2009, Reynolds changed his blog header to the color green from its original red, in support of the anti-Ahmadinejad/pro-Mousavi protests made after the Iranian Presidential election. This was originally supposed to be a temporary show of support, but it lasted about three months. On September 7, 2009, Reynolds replaced the green with his customary red, remarking, "I’m back to the original design. 'Going Green' was supposed to be a show of support, not a permanent change, and the summer’s over. My support for the Iranian freedom movement is no less, but symbolism takes you only so far."

== Influence on other bloggers ==
Sometimes referred to as "the Blogfather, and credited with an "ethic of driving traffic to new blogs from all over the political spectrum," Reynolds managed to attract a large following of imitators who adopted his blogging style. His ability to "foster a hospitable environment for new bloggers" has been attributed to his involvement in home-recording punk and new-wave music, and his adaptation of the participatory ethos of these musical styles to online publishing.

In April 2002, Reynolds published a list of well over two hundred blogs that claimed to be directly inspired by his own.

Instapundit's popularity led to the common adoption of the suffix "-pundit" in blog titles, for example Kevin Drum (who originally blogged as "CalPundit") and Allahpundit. There are also direct take-offs on the entire name, such as Instapunk, and IsntAPundit. There are many other "-pundit" blogs, of all political stripes inspired to some degree by Instapundit.

== See also ==
- Caio Blinder
