= Bonus Bill of 1817 =

U.S. proposed legislation vetoed by President Madison

The Bonus Bill of 1817 was legislation proposed by John C. Calhoun to earmark the revenue "bonus," as well as future dividends, from the recently established Second Bank of the United States for an internal improvements fund. Proponents of the bill stressed the nearly universally accepted need for improvements and brushed off strict constructionists with their own arguments in favor of "implied powers." Although President James Madison approved of the need and stated goals of improvements, he vetoed the bill as unconstitutional because he found no expressed congressional power to fund roads and canals in Article I, Section 8, of the United States Constitution. His veto message represented an important explication by the "Father of the Constitution."

== Legislative history ==
The bonus of $1.5 million and dividends, estimated at $650,000 annually, would be used as a fund "for constructing roads and canals and improving the navigation of watercourses." Calhoun, who had also introduced the proposition in the previous session, defended it on the broad ground that "whatever impedes the intercourse of the extremes with the center of the republic weakens the Union" and that it was the duty of Congress to "bind the republic together with a perfect system of roads and canals." The bill proposed no specific system or improvements, but when pressed, Calhoun endorsed something along the lines of Albert Gallatin's 1808 Report, which had been printed in 1816. Initially proposed as an open-ended financing mechanism for improvements, the bill by the time of its passage, required for each state to benefit equally from the new fund and to approve all federal activities within its borders. Those compromises weakened the bill and underscore how difficult it was to effect improvements broadly and singly. The bill narrowly (86-84) passed the US House of Representatives on February 8, 1817 and did slightly better (20–15) in the US Senate on February 27.

On the last day of his administration, on March 3, 1817, Madison vetoed the bill for fear that Clay, Calhoun, and their supporters were playing too fast and loose with the Constitution. He felt that Congress did not have the power under the Constitution to effect internal improvements.

Additionally, Madison was appalled at the logrolling and blatant pork barrel spending that accompanied the Bonus Bill debates. That led him to believe that "special-interest issues like internal improvements inexorably corrupted the legislative process." A last-ditch effort to override the veto failed.

== Political legacy ==
For most scholars, the failure of the Bonus Bill marks the end of efforts to establish a federal system of internal improvements, but that view is not supported by subsequent events and the growth in federal spending on them. While President James Monroe's announced support for the bonus bill veto slowed improvements legislation during the early part of his administration, the first salvo arrived on March 14, 1818, when the House passed a resolution declaring that Congress had the power to appropriate money for the construction of roads and canals and for the improvement of watercourses. On May 4, 1822, Monroe vetoed a bill to fund and collect tolls on the Cumberland Road.

In an unprecedented step, the president used the occasion to present a report titled "Views of the President of the United States on the Subject of Internal Improvements." In the critical document, Monroe made clear that the Constitution did not empower Congress to establish any system of internal improvements, but he stated, "To the appropriation of the public money to improvements,... I do not see any well-founded constitutional objection...." Additional internal improvements legislation would later follow.
