= Lois Lerner =

American attorney (born 1950)

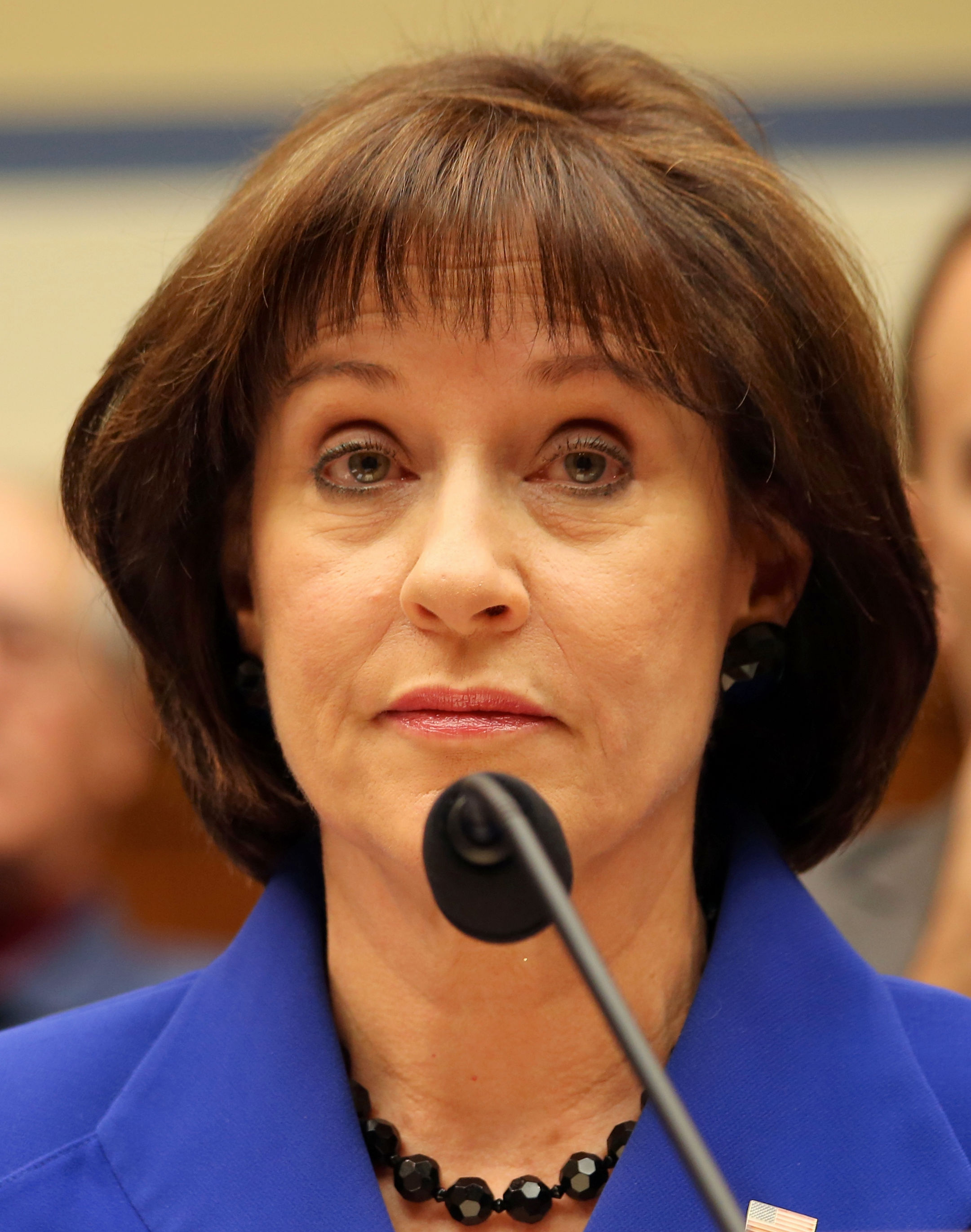
- Born: Lois Gail Lerner; October 12, 1950 (age 76)
- Education: Northeastern University (BA); Western New England University (JD)

Lois Gail Lerner (born October 12, 1950) is an American attorney and former United States federal civil service employee. She served as director of the Exempt Organizations Unit of the Internal Revenue Service (IRS) in 2005, and subsequently became the central figure in the 2013 IRS targeting controversy in the targeting of politically aligned groups, either denying them tax-exempt status outright or delaying that status until they could no longer take effective part in the 2012 election.

On May 10, 2013, in a conference call with reporters, Lerner apologized that Tea Party groups and other groups had been targeted for audits of their applications for tax-exemption. Lerner resigned over the controversy. An investigation by the U.S. Department of Justice and Federal Bureau of Investigation, completed in 2015, found "substantial evidence of mismanagement, poor judgment and institutional inertia" but "found no evidence that any IRS official acted based on political, discriminatory, corrupt, or other inappropriate motives that would support a criminal prosecution".

== Early life ==
Lerner graduated from Northeastern University. She earned her J.D. from the Western New England College of Law.

== Career before the IRS ==
After graduating from law school, Lerner became a staff attorney in the U.S. Department of Justice Criminal Division.

Lerner then joined the Federal Election Commission's (FEC) general counsel's office as an assistant general counsel in 1981. She spent twenty years at the FEC, being appointed Associate General Counsel for Enforcement (the head of the FEC's Enforcement Division) in 1986. Lerner was acting general counsel for the FEC for the first six months of 2001.

== Internal Revenue Service career ==
Lerner joined the Internal Revenue Service in 2001, as Director of Rulings and Agreements in the Exempt Organizations function of TEGE.

In January 2006, she was appointed Director Exempt Organizations. In that capacity, Lerner led an organization of 900 IRS tax law enforcement officials responsible for a broad range of compliance activities, including examining the operational and financial activities of exempt organizations, processing applications for tax exemption, providing direction through private letter rulings and technical guidance, and providing customer education and outreach to the exempt community.

== 2013 IRS controversy ==
On May 10, 2013, in advance of a public release of the audit findings, Lerner answered a planted question at a meeting of the American Bar Association (ABA) by stating that the IRS was "apologetic" for what she termed "absolutely inappropriate" actions. Lerner said that the extra scrutiny had not been centrally planned and had been done by low-level "front-line people" in the Cincinnati office. The Washington Post subsequently reported that documents showed that "IRS officials at the agency's Washington headquarters sent queries to conservative groups asking about their donors and other aspects of their operations, while officials in the El Monte and Laguna Niguel offices in California sent similar questionnaires to tea-party-affiliated groups." Lerner's superior, then-acting IRS Commissioner Steven Miller, later testified to Congress that he had discussed with Lerner how she was to make the revelation and apology using a planted question at the ABA meeting, rather than at her appearance two days earlier before the House Ways and Means Committee.

On May 10, 2013, in a conference call with reporters, Lerner apologized that Tea Party groups and other groups had been targeted for audits of their applications for tax-exemption. Lerner told those on the conference call that, in an attempt to manage the large number of tax-exemption applications between 2010 and 2012, the agency had identified some applicants using "shortcuts" such as targeting those applications containing terms like "Tea Party" or "patriots" in their titles. Lerner said, however, that such actions were not driven by any political agenda, but added, "We made some mistakes. Some people didn't use good judgment.... For that we're apologetic." Lerner also said that only about 25 percent of the flagged applications were Tea Party related, but admitted that any singling out of the groups was "absolutely inappropriate and not the way we should do things."

=== Administrative leave and resignation ===
On May 23, 2013, the IRS placed Lerner on paid administrative leave. As her interim replacement, Acting IRS Commissioner Daniel Werfel named Ken Corbin, previously deputy director of the Submission Processing, Wage, and Investment Division, as acting director of the Exempt Organizations Division. Later, while still on administrative leave, Lerner formally resigned, and retired from the IRS, effective September 23, 2013.

=== 2014 Contempt of Congress citation ===
In May 2014, Lerner was declared in contempt of Congress in connection with her invocation of her Fifth Amendment right not to testify on the matter before a congressional committee. The contempt resolution, H.Res. 574, was introduced in the United States House of Representatives on May 7, 2014, by Representative Darrell Issa, Republican of California.

On May 7, 2014, the resolution passed on a 231–187 vote, with all Republicans and six Democrats voting in favor, and every other Democrat opposed. Representative Steve Stockman introduced a measure (never taken up by the House) that, had it been adopted, would have directed Speaker John Boehner to instruct the House sergeant at arms to arrest Lerner for contempt of Congress.

In a seven-page letter to Speaker Boehner dated March 31, 2015, United States Attorney for the District of Columbia Ronald Machen said that the Justice Department would not pursue criminal contempt charges against Lerner. Machen disagreed with Issa's assertion that Lerner had waived her constitutional right against self-incrimination by making an opening statement at a May 2013 hearing in which she made a brief opening remark proclaiming her innocence, before invoking her Fifth Amendment privilege. In a statement, the U.S. Attorney's Office wrote: "Ms. Lerner did not waive her Fifth Amendment privilege by making general claims of innocence. The Constitution would provide Ms. Lerner with an absolute defense if she were prosecuted for contempt."

=== Congressional subpoenaing of Lerner's email messages ===
In 2014, the House Oversight Committee under Issa issued subpoenas for all of Lerner's email messages. One subpoena directed FEC chairman Lee E. Goodman to turn over all emails sent to or from Lerner, or copied to Lerner, from the past 28 years, stretching back to January 1, 1986, a time before commercialized email existed.

The House Oversight Committee also subpoenaed the IRS for all e-mails to and from Lerner and various other employees, such as Lerner subordinate Holly Paz, General Counsel William Wilkins and chief of staff Jonathan Davis. At a hearing in March 2014, IRS commissioner John Koskinen said that the IRS had by that time provided 690,000 pages of documents to the House Ways and Means Committee and the Senate Finance Committee and 420,000 of redacted documents to the House and Senate oversight committees. Koskinen said that the IRS had spent 10 months and $15 million complying with various investigations to date, and that it could take months or years to comply with broader subpoenas.

In 2014, in further pursuit of the House of Representatives Congressional inquiry, the House Oversight Committee, chaired by Jason Chaffetz (R-Utah), issued a subpoena for all of Lerner's email messages during the time in question. Months later, the IRS informed Congress that they did not have all of her email messages, due to her hard drive crashing, causing them to be irretrievably lost, that the IRS had taken steps to recover the email messages, but that it was impossible. The IRS Inspector General's office said, however, that they found back-up computer tapes, and would attempt to reconstitute the emails from the back-up tapes. Committee Investigators, however, said that when they later went to obtain the backup tapes from the IRS, the IRS employees in the back-up tape unit said that no one from IRS headquarters had ever asked for them.

=== Hard drive crash and back-up tape erasure of Lerner's emails ===
Testifying in June 2015, the IRS Deputy Inspector General Timothy P. Camus said that 424 back-up tapes, most likely to have contained the missing emails, were erased in March 2014—a month after the IRS said it realized it was missing some of Lerner's emails because of a hard-drive crash, and although the emails were then under subpoena from the Oversight Committee. He stated, however, that their investigation "did not uncover evidence that the erasure was done ... to destroy evidence or conceal information from Congress", and noted that there was a "remote possibility" that additional emails might still be found. He said that officials were examining the possibility, however, of criminal activity.

Testifying in June 2015, Treasury Inspector General for Tax Administration Russell George and his deputy, Timothy Camus, told the Oversight Committee an investigation by them had been able to recover more than 1,000 emails that the IRS did not turn over to Congress. Their investigation could not determine why Lerner's computer crashed, but that, "Prior to our investigation, and our efforts to recover Ms. Lerner's missing e-mails, the IRS did not search for, review or examine the two separate sources of backup tapes, the server hard drives, or the loaner laptops that ultimately produced new, previously undisclosed e-mails."

In a statement released June 25, 2015, the IRS said it has "fully cooperated with the investigation", but acknowledged the backup tapes should not have been erased. "The IRS recognizes there was a clear breakdown of communication in one part of the organization regarding the need to preserve and retain the back-up tapes and information," the statement said, noting that an internal review found the erasure wasn't intentional.

=== Email account under the name "Toby Miles" ===
On August 23, 2015, the IRS told a federal court that Lerner had a second personal email account that she used to conduct IRS business. The account was set up under the name "Toby Miles". The disclosure occurred in a lawsuit by the Judicial Watch, which is suing to obtain the release of Lerner's emails. According to Eliana Johnson of National Review, a former colleague said that Toby Miles was the name of Lerner's dog.

=== FBI finds no evidence to support criminal prosecution ===
The U.S. Department of Justice and the FBI began an investigation into the IRS controversy in May 2013. In October 2015, the DOJ announced it was closing the investigation and would not seek criminal charges. The determination came after an investigation of almost two years, in which the DOJ and FBI interviewed more than 100 witnesses and reviewed more than a million pages of IRS documents.

In a letter to House Judiciary Committee Chairman Bob Goodlatte, Republican of Virginia, announcing the case closure, Assistant Attorney General for Legislative Affairs Peter J. Kadzik wrote that while "our investigation uncovered substantial evidence of mismanagement, poor judgment, and institutional inertia...Not a single IRS employee reported any allegation, concern or suspicion that the handling of tax-exempt applications—or any other IRS function—was motivated by political bias, discriminatory intent, or corruption." Kadzik wrote "We found no evidence that any IRS official acted based on political, discriminatory, corrupt, or other inappropriate motives that would support a criminal prosecution." Kadzik stated that the investigation specifically absolved Lerner of criminal liability, and determined that Lerner was in fact the first official to recognize a problem and try and correct it.

Reactions to the investigation's conclusions were split along partisan lines. Representative Darrell Issa, Republican of California, the chairman of the House Oversight and Government Reform Committee, said that decision not to prosecute ignored "volumes of evidence in the public record and efforts to obstruct legitimate inquires", and that "giving Lois Lerner a free pass only reinforces the idea that government officials are above the law and that there is no consequence for wrongdoing". Representative Elijah E. Cummings, Democrat of Maryland, the ranking member of the Oversight Committee, said "...I believe the American people have higher expectations for their elected officials, and they want Congress to start doing its job and focusing on issues that matter instead of these ridiculous, partisan, taxpayer-funded attacks." House Judiciary Committee Chairman Goodlatte, the recipient of the DOJ letter, said that DOJ's decision was "...disturbing. The American people should be concerned that this kind of politicization continues to go unchecked by this administration and a Justice Department charged with pursuing wrongdoing", and 19 members of the House Oversight and Government Reform Committee led by the committee's Chairman, Jason Chaffetz (R-Utah), filed a resolution to impeach IRS Commissioner John Koskinen.

== Personal life ==
Lerner is a past president of the Council on Governmental Ethics Laws (COGEL).

Lerner has stated she is "not a political person" but is a registered Democrat and has voted for candidates from both parties.

== See also ==
- Finding Lois Lerner in contempt of Congress (H.Res. 574; 113th Congress)
