= Contempt of Congress =

Act of obstructing the US Congress's work

Contempt of Congress is the misdemeanor act of obstructing the work of the United States Congress or one of its committees. Historically, the bribery of a U.S. senator or U.S. representative was considered contempt of Congress. In modern times, contempt of Congress has generally applied to the refusal to comply with a subpoena issued by a congressional committee or subcommittee—usually seeking to compel either testimony or the production of requested documents.

== History ==
In the late 1790s, declaring contempt of Congress was considered an "implied power" of the legislature, in a similar manner as the British Parliament could make findings of contempt of Parliament—early Congresses issued contempt citations against numerous individuals for a variety of actions. Some instances of contempt of Congress included citations against:

- Robert Randal, for an attempt to bribe Representative William Smith of South Carolina in 1795.
- William Duane, a newspaper editor who refused to answer Senate questions in 1800.
- Nathaniel Rounsavell, another newspaper editor, for releasing sensitive information to the press in 1812.

In Anderson v. Dunn (1821), the Supreme Court of the United States held that Congress's power to hold someone in contempt was essential to ensure that Congress was "... not exposed to every indignity and interruption that rudeness, caprice, or even conspiracy, may mediate against it." The historical interpretation that bribery of a senator or representative was considered contempt of Congress has long since been abandoned in favor of criminal statutes. In 1857, Congress enacted a law that made "contempt of Congress" a criminal offense against the United States.

In the Air Mail Scandal of 1934, William MacCracken, former Assistant Secretary of Commerce for Aeronautics, was sentenced to ten days of detention for destroying evidence under subpoena. MacCracken appealed his sentence to the Supreme Court in Jurney v. MacCracken. After losing his case, he surrendered to Chesley Jurney, Senate sergeant at arms, who detained him in a room at the Willard Hotel.

While it has been said that "Congress is handcuffed in getting obstinate witnesses to comply", cases have been referred to the United States Department of Justice. The Office of Legal Counsel has asserted that the President of the United States is protected from contempt by executive privilege.

In March 2024, it was reported that Peter Navarro would be the first former White House official to be imprisoned for a contempt of Congress criminal conviction. Steve Bannon would then follow in July 2024. Both Navarro and Bannon's contempt of Congress convictions and prison sentences were connected with their refusals to comply with subpoenas which required them testify before the now-defunct House Select Committee that investigated January 6, 2021.

== Subpoenas ==
The Supreme Court affirmed in Watkins v. United States (1957) that "[the] power of the Congress to conduct investigations is inherent in the legislative process" and that "[it] is unquestionably the duty of all citizens to cooperate with the Congress in its efforts to obtain the facts needed for intelligent legislative action. It is their unremitting obligation to respond to subpoenas, to respect the dignity of the Congress and its committees and to testify fully with respect to matters within the province of proper investigation." Congressional rules empower all its standing committees with the authority to compel witnesses to produce testimony and documents for subjects under its jurisdiction. Committee rules may provide for the full committee to issue a subpoena, or permit subcommittees or the chairman (acting alone or with the ranking member) to issue subpoenas.

As announced in Wilkinson v. United States (1961), a congressional committee must meet three requirements for its subpoenas to be "legally sufficient." First, the committee's investigation of the broad subject area must be authorized by its chamber; second, the investigation must pursue "a valid legislative purpose" but does not need to involve legislation and does not need to specify the ultimate intent of Congress; and third, the specific inquiries must be pertinent to the subject matter area that has been authorized for investigation.

The Court held in Eastland v. United States Servicemen's Fund (1975) that congressional subpoenas are within the scope of the Speech or Debate Clause which provides "an absolute bar to judicial interference" once it is determined that Members are acting within the "legitimate legislative sphere" with such compulsory process. Under that ruling, courts generally do not hear motions to quash congressional subpoenas; even when executive branch officials refuse to comply, courts tend to rule that such matters are "political questions" unsuitable for judicial remedy. In fact, many legal rights usually associated with a judicial subpoena do not apply to a congressional subpoena. For example, attorney–client privilege and information that is normally protected under the Trade Secrets Act do not need to be recognized.

== Procedures ==
Following the refusal of a witness to produce documents or to testify, the committee is entitled to report a resolution of contempt to its parent chamber. A committee may also cite a person for contempt but not immediately report the resolution to the floor. In the case of subcommittees, they report the resolution of contempt to the full committee, which then has the option of rejecting it, accepting it but not reporting it to the floor, or accepting it and reporting it to the floor of the chamber for action. On the floor of the House or the Senate, the reported resolution is considered privileged and, if the resolution of contempt is passed, the chamber has several options to enforce its mandate.

=== Inherent contempt ===
Under this process, the procedure for holding a person in contempt involves only the chamber concerned. Following a contempt citation, the person cited is arrested by the Sergeant-at-Arms of the House or Senate, brought to the floor of the chamber, held to answer charges by the presiding officer, and then subjected to punishment as the chamber may dictate (usually imprisonment for punishment, imprisonment for coercion, or release from the contempt citation).

Concerned with the time-consuming nature of a contempt proceeding and the inability to extend punishment further than the session of the Congress concerned (under Supreme Court rulings), Congress created a statutory process in 1857. While Congress retains its "inherent contempt" authority and may exercise it at any time, this inherent contempt process was last used by the Senate in 1934, in a Senate investigation of airlines and the U.S. Postmaster. After a one-week trial on the Senate floor (presided over by Vice President John Nance Garner, in his capacity as President of the Senate), William P. MacCracken Jr., a lawyer and former Assistant Secretary of Commerce for Aeronautics who was charged with allowing clients to remove or rip up subpoenaed documents, was found guilty and sentenced to 10 days imprisonment.

MacCracken filed a petition of habeas corpus in federal courts to overturn his arrest, but after litigation, the U.S. Supreme Court ruled that Congress had acted constitutionally, and denied the petition in the case Jurney v. MacCracken.

The last attempt by the House of Representatives to use this inherent contempt process was on July 11, 2024, when they voted on a resolution that could have held Attorney General Merrick Garland in inherent contempt of Congress. The resolution would have imposed a fine of $10,000 per day on Garland for defying a congressional subpoena until he handed over audio of former special counsel Robert Hur's interview with President Joe Biden. This attempt fell short in a 204 to 210 vote by the House of Representatives and Garland was not found in inherent contempt, with four Republicans voting with all Democrats to oppose the measure.

=== Statutory proceedings ===
Following a contempt citation, the presiding officer of the chamber is instructed to refer the matter to the U.S. Attorney for the District of Columbia; according to the law it is the duty of the U.S. Attorney to refer the matter to a grand jury for action.

The criminal offense of contempt of Congress is a misdemeanor, punishable by a fine of not more than $100,000 nor less than $100 and imprisonment in a common jail for not less than one month nor more than twelve months.

=== Civil procedures ===
Senate Rules authorize the Senate to direct the Senate Legal Counsel to file a civil action against any private individual found in contempt. Upon motion by the Senate, the federal district court issues another order for a person to comply with Senate process. If the subject then refuses to comply with the Court's order, the person may be cited for contempt of court and may incur sanctions imposed by the Court. The process has been used at least six times.

== Partial list contempt resolutions since 1975 ==
Person	Subcommittee/Committee	Chamber	Ultimate Disposition
Rogers C.B. Morton, Secretary of Commerce	November 11, 1975; Subcommittee of the House Committee on Interstate and Foreign Commerce	Not considered	Morton released the material to the subcommittee.
Henry Kissinger, Secretary of State	November 15, 1975; House Select Committee on Intelligence	Not considered	Citation dismissed after "substantial compliance" with subpoena.
Joseph A. Califano Jr., Secretary of Health, Education, and Welfare	August 6, 1978; Subcommittee of the House Committee on Interstate and Foreign Commerce	Not considered	Califano complied with the subpoena about one month after the subcommittee citation.
Charles W. Duncan Jr., Secretary of Energy	April 29, 1980; Subcommittee of the House Committee on Government Operations	Not considered	Duncan supplied the material by May 14, 1980.
James B. Edwards, Secretary of Energy	July 23, 1981; Environment, Energy, and Natural Resources Subcommittee of the House Committee on Government Operations	Not considered	Documents were delivered to Congress prior to full Committee consideration of the contempt citation.
James G. Watt, Secretary of the Interior	February 9, 1982; Subcommittee of House Committee on Energy and Commerce; February 25, 1982; House Committee on Energy and Commerce	Not considered	The White House delivered documents to the Rayburn House Office Building for review by Committee members for four hours, providing for no staff or photocopies.
Anne Gorsuch, Administrator of the Environmental Protection Agency	December 2, 1982; Oversight Subcommittee of the House Committee on Public Works and Transportation House Committee on Public Works and Transportation	House of Representatives	U.S. Attorney Stanley S. Harris never presented the case to a Grand Jury as required by law. After legal cases and a court dismissal of the Executive Branch's suit, the parties reached an agreement to provide documents and withdrew contempt citation.
Rita Lavelle, EPA official	April 26, 1983; House Committee on Energy and Commerce	House of Representatives	Indicted for contempt of Congress, but acquitted in trial; Later convicted for lying to Congress and sentenced to 6 months in prison, 5 years probation thereafter, and a fine of $10,000.
Jack Quinn, White House Counsel	May 9, 1996; House Committee on Oversight and Government Reform	Not considered	Subpoenaed documents were provided hours before the House of Representatives was set to consider the contempt citation.
David Watkins, White House Director of Administration; Matthew Moore, White House aide	May 9, 1996; House Committee on Oversight and Government Reform	Not considered	Subpoenaed documents were provided hours before the House of Representatives was set to consider the contempt citation.
Janet Reno, Attorney General	August 6, 1998; House Committee on Oversight and Government Reform	Not considered	The majority of documents in question were released following the conclusion of the Department of Justice investigation into campaign finance violations of 1996. However, an additional memo was withheld and later claimed as privileged by the George W. Bush administration.
Harriet Miers, Former White House Counsel	July 25, 2007; House Committee on the Judiciary	February 14, 2008 House of Representatives	On March 4, 2009, Miers and former Deputy Chief of Staff to President Bush Karl Rove agreed to testify under oath before Congress about the firings of U.S. attorneys
Joshua Bolten, White House Chief of Staff	July 25, 2007; House Committee on the Judiciary	February 14, 2008 House of Representatives	On March 4, 2009, Miers and former Deputy Chief of Staff to President Bush Karl Rove agreed to testify under oath before Congress about the firings of U.S. attorneys
Eric Holder, Attorney General	June 20, 2012; House Committee on Oversight and Government Reform	June 28, 2012 House of Representatives	Found in contempt by a vote of 255–67
Lois Lerner; Director of the IRS Exempt Organizations Division	March 11, 2014; House Committee on Oversight and Government Reform	May 7, 2014 House of Representatives	Found in contempt for her role in the 2013 IRS controversy and refusal to testify. The Department of Justice declined to prosecute. (See: Finding Lois Lerner in contempt of Congress (H.Res. 574; 113th Congress))
Bryan Pagliano; IT director, Hillary Clinton aide	September 13, 2016; House Committee on Oversight and Government Reform	Not considered	House Committee voted, 19–15, to recommend Pagliano for a contempt resolution for failing to appear during a September 13 and 22, 2016, hearing after being subpoenaed and submitting a written Fifth Amendment plea in lieu of appearing in person. No contempt resolution was considered by the chamber but Committee member Jason Chaffetz subsequently addressed a letter to the US Attorney General, writing as an individual member of Congress, requesting DOJ prosecution of Pagliano for misdemeanor "contumacious conduct."
Backpage.com	March 17, 2016; Senate Homeland Security Permanent Subcommittee on Investigations	March 17, 2016 Senate	Found in contempt for failing to provide documents in an investigation into human trafficking.
William P. Barr, United States Attorney General Wilbur Ross, United States Secretary of Commerce	House Committee on Oversight and Reform	July 17, 2019, House of Representatives	Refusal to Comply with Subpoenas Duly Issued by the Committee on Oversight and Reform
Chad Wolf, United States Secretary of Homeland Security	September 17, 2020; House Homeland Security Committee	Not considered	Acting Homeland Secretary Chad Wolf defies subpoena and skips House hearing as he faces whistleblower allegations that he urged department officials to alter intelligence.
Steve Bannon	October 18, 2021 House Select Committee on the January 6 Attack	October 21, 2021, House of Representatives	Found guilty by a Federal Jury of unlawfully defying a subpoena issued by the January 6th Committee. Sentenced to 4 months in prison. Began serving his four-month prison sentence on July 1, 2024, after his appeal was rejected by the Supreme Court.
Mark Meadows, White House Chief of Staff	December 13, 2021 House Select Committee on the January 6 Attack	House of Representatives	On December 14, 2021, House of Representatives voted 222–203 to hold Meadows in contempt for defying a January 6 Committee subpoena.
Peter Navarro, White House Adviser	February 23, 2022 House Select Committee on the January 6 Attack	House of Representatives	Found guilty by a Federal Jury of contempt of Congress by unlawfully defying a subpoena issued by the January 6th Committee on September 7, 2023. Began serving his 4-month sentence on March 19, 2024, after his appeal was rejected by the Supreme Court.
Dan Scavino, White House Deputy Chief of Staff for Communications	February 23, 2022 House Select Committee on the January 6 Attack	House of Representatives	On April 6, 2022, House of Representatives voted 220–203 to hold Scavino in contempt for defying a January 6 Committee subpoena.
Hunter Biden, son of President Joe Biden	January 10, 2024 House Committee on the Judiciary, House Committee on Oversight and Reform	House of Representatives	Biden agreed to provide a deposition to Committee on Oversight and Reform.
Merrick Garland, U.S. Attorney General	June 12, 2024 House Committee on the Judiciary	House of Representatives	Found in contempt by a 216–207 vote for refusing to comply with subpoenas from the House Judiciary and Oversight committees.
Merrick Garland, U.S. Attorney General	July 10, 2024 Brought forward by a privileged resolution written by U.S. Representative Anna Paulina Luna	House of Representatives	On July 11, the United States House of Representatives found Garland not in "inherent contempt" by a 204–210 vote.
Ralph de la Torre, CEO of Steward Health Care	September 19, 2024 Senate Committee on Health, Education, Labor and Pensions (HELP)	Senate	Found in criminal contempt by unanimous consent on September 25, 2024. Certification of civil contempt charge is pending submission of a report by the HELP Committee.
Antony Blinken, U.S. Secretary of State	September 24, 2024 House Foreign Affairs Committee	Not considered	The full House of Representatives has not yet scheduled a vote on the committee's recommendation. However, the Speaker of the House of Representatives, Mike Johnson, commented that he expected the measure would likely not be taken up for a vote until after the presidential election.
Anthony Fauci, former NIAID director and former Chief Medical Advisor to President Biden	August 6, 2026 Senate Homeland Security Committee	Senate	Found in contempt by the Senate Homeland Security and Governmental Affairs committee for declining to answer lawmakers’ questions at a hearing. The Senate Committee voted 8–5. Contempt resolution referred to the Department of Justice and the United States Attorney for the District of Columbia.

== See also ==
- Contempt of court
- Contempt of parliament
- The Hollywood Ten
- Separation of powers under the United States Constitution
