= United States Senate Homeland Security Subcommittee on Financial and Contracting Oversight =

The Senate Homeland Security and Governmental Affairs Subcommittee on Financial and Contracting Oversight was one of the four subcommittees within the Senate Committee on Homeland Security and Governmental Affairs during the 113th congress.

== Members, 113th Congress ==
Majority	Minority
Claire McCaskill, Missouri, Chairwoman; Carl Levin, Michigan; Mark Pryor, Arkansas; Mark Begich, Alaska; Tammy Baldwin, Wisconsin	Ron Johnson, Wisconsin, Ranking Member; John McCain, Arizona; Rob Portman, Ohio
Ex officio
Tom Carper, Delaware	Tom Coburn, Oklahoma
