= Center for Effective Government =

American former think tank

The Center for Effective Government, formerly OMB Watch, was a think tank and advocacy group based in Washington, D.C. It was focused on government transparency. Founded in 1983, the organization ceased operations in 2016, folding its work into the Project On Government Oversight.

== History ==
OMB Watch was formed by Gary D. Bass in 1983 in an effort to increase transparency surrounding the Office of Management and Budget (OMB).

OMB Watch changed its name to the Center for Effective Government in January 2013. In March 2016, the organization closed its doors, folding its work into the Project On Government Oversight. The reason was financial difficulties.

== Activities ==
The Center for Effective Government concentrated on four main areas: the role of government; information and access; budget, taxation and government performance; and regulatory policy. The organization's goal was to improve access to decision-makers and energize citizen participation. Charity Navigator rated Center for Effective Government with four stars out of four possible for financial performance, accountability and transparency.

The Center's reports were used by media outlets, such as Politico, when it quoted CEG's second annual performance analysis of the 15 government agencies' processing the most Freedom of Information Act (United States) requests and NGO's like Immigration Impact and in complaints or lawsuits, such as Brown et al. v. U.S. Customs and Border Protection, (132 F.Supp.3d 1170, 2015).

Comments by staff were included in newspapers such as the Fiscal Times.

CEG gave testimony, submitted comments, statements and questions for the record, to Congress and other governmental bodies.
