= Gary D. Bass =

American activist

Gary D. Bass is an American nonprofit executive. He is the founder and former executive director of OMB Watch (1983 to 2011), former executive director of the Bauman Foundation, and an adjunct professor at Georgetown University.

== Education ==
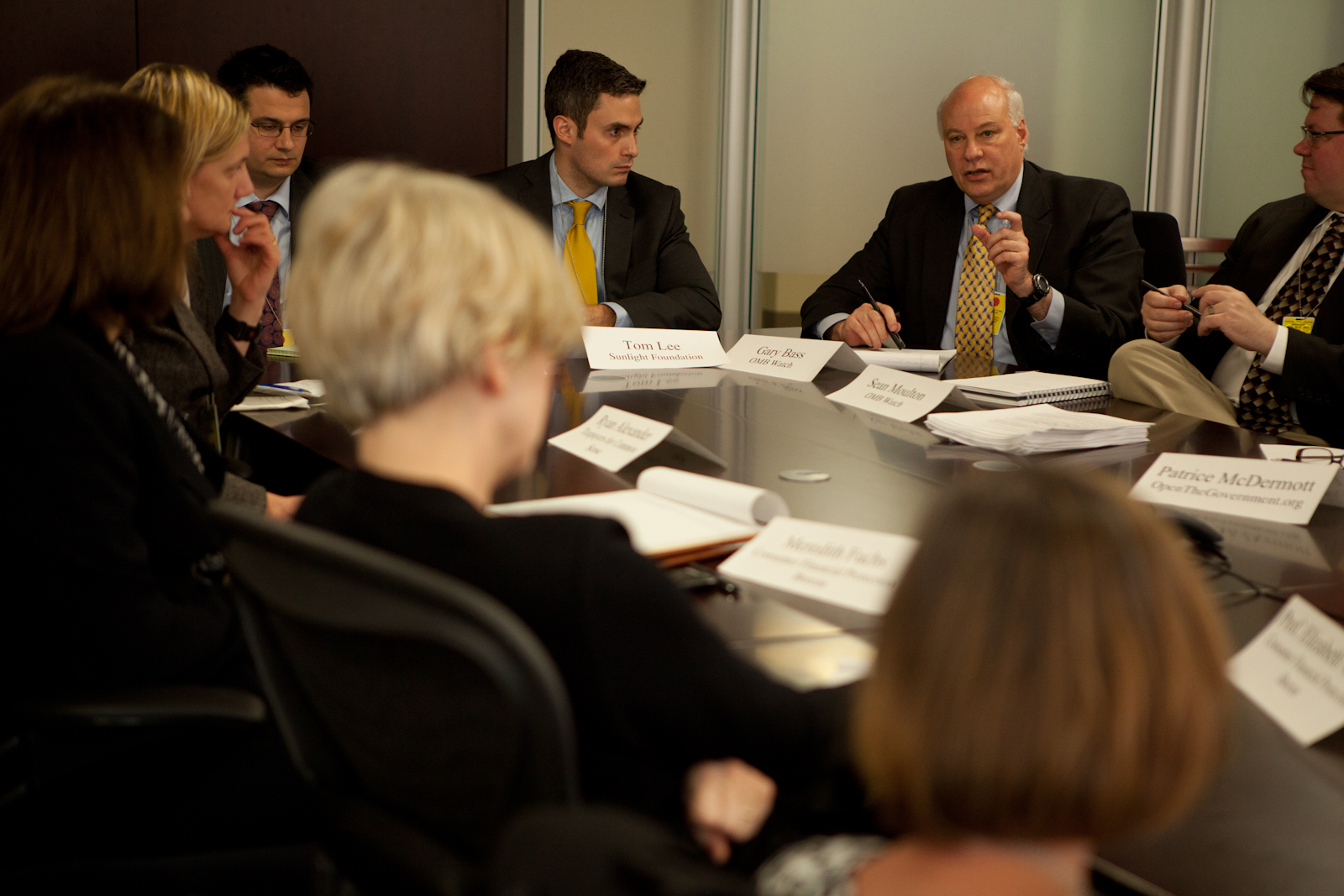

Bass received a B.A., M.S., and PhD from the University of Michigan. His doctorate was in psychology and education.

== Career ==
He was president of the Human Services Information Center before founding OMB Watch in 1983. Since then, he has been a prominent commentator on federal information policy issues and assisted other nonprofit organizations: The NonProfit Times listed him within their Power and Influence Top 50. In 1989, he created RTK NET (the Right-to-Know Network), a free online service to provide community groups with access to government data.

Bass is co-author of Seen but Not Heard: Strengthening Nonprofit Advocacy, a book published in 2007 by the Aspen Institute.

Bass is a senior fellow of the Administrative Conference of the United States and a fellow of the National Academy of Public Administration.
