= Project Cassandra (literature) =

Project Cassandra is a project aimed to use literature as "a tool for early crisis detection". The project was funded by German Federal Ministry of Defence and is being led by Jürgen Wertheimer, a professor of comparative literature at Weltethos Institut. In recent years, the Cassandra project has primarily worked on the basis of individual assignments for various sectors, including the Bertelsmann Foundation (studies on the future of Europe and the well-being of young people before and after the COVID-19 pandemic), the Ministry of Economic Affairs, and the Federal Government's Commissioner for Eastern Germany (studies on the challenges and future prospects of reunification as well as on transformation processes focusing on the Lusatia and Ruhr regions).

Currently, the focus is a project by the NATO Defense College in Rome on the Taiwan-China conflict. Starting in January 2025, studies on Jordan and Poland as future "hubs" between systems will follow. Affiliated institutions include Dalhousie University in Halifax, the Universities of Wrocław and Paris IV, the Munich Security Conference, and the Global Ethic Foundation. The general objective remains the mapping and ongoing observation of fractures within and outside of Europe.

== Background and approach ==
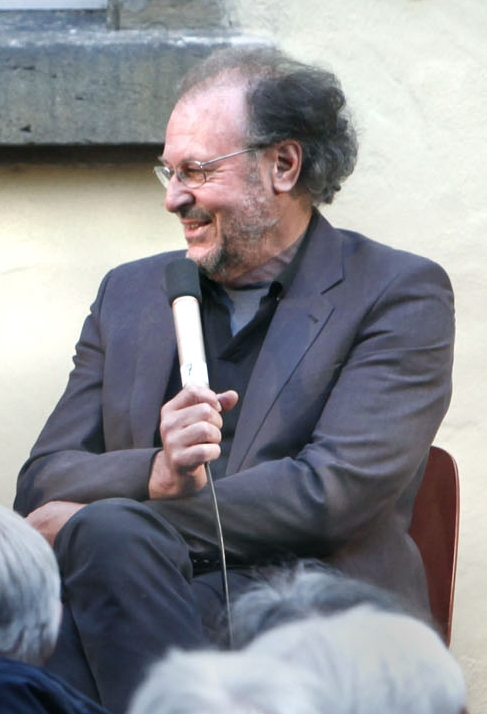
Jürgen Wertheimer in 2011

Jürgen Wertheimer said that "Writers represent reality in such a way that their readers can instantly visualise a world and recognise themselves inside it. They operate on a plane that is both objective and subjective, creating inventories of the emotional interiors of individual lives throughout history. We were interested in what hit a nerve. Was a book heaped with awards? Or banned and the author had to leave the country?"

The team analyzed literature of the problematic regions, such as Kosovo in 1998–1999, Nigeria, and Algeria. Such analysis "have shown that the monitoring and analysis of literature can be used as an early indicator of where and how perceptions and interpretations of reality change and where fictional texts influence the views of groups and societies – often years before these changes manifest themselves in the form of concrete action. The awareness of existing and emerging fictions and narratives enables a differentiated understanding of the roots of conflicts and their mental and emotional contexts. This allows for an early recognition of latent/protracted conflicts and violence-endorsing narratives."

The team described their approach as "literary infrastructure" investigation: they want to know "what happens around the text? How is it being received? 'We became interested in what hit a nerve. Was a book heaped with awards and state prizes? Or was it banned and the author had to leave the country?' Kuwait, for example, saw a rise of novels about the situation of the stateless Bidoon minority after 2010. Many of them were censored or banned shortly after their publication, prefiguring the crackdown on Bidoon protesters in 2019." To do this, the team reached authors and critics in their locations of interest.

Examples of literature that "predicted" conflicts:

- The Invasion of 1910, published in Britain in 1906, "which propagated Germanophobia in Britain, through its imagined German invasion of Britain"
- Kassandra, 1983, by Christa Wolf: the book "casts Troy as a state not unlike the late-stage German Democratic Republic, succumbing to the paranoia of a Stasi-like secret police as it veers towards a not-so-cold war. Kassandra, cursed with the gift of prophecy, is also a cipher for the author's own predicament: she foresees the decline her society is heading for, but her warnings are ignored by the military patriarchy."
- Dove Hole play, 1983, by Jovan Radulović "about an Ustashe massacre against their Serbian neighbours, and the expulsion of non-Serbian writers from the Serbian Writers' Association in 1986."
- The Plot Against America by Philip Roth, "written a decade-and-a-half before Donald Trump ran for the presidency in 2016"

Wertheimer said that to predict "a conflict a year, or a year and a half in advance, that's something our systems were already capable of. Cassandra promised to register disturbances five to seven years in advance – that was something new."

The team created a "risk score system" and assessed books with nine indicators, and each book received a score between -1 and +3: "the higher the score, the more 'dangerous' the text".

1. thematic reach
2. censorship of the text
3. censorship of the author
4. media response
5. scandals around the text
6. scandals around the author
7. literary awards for the author
8. literary awards for the text
9. narrative strategy

== Analyzed regions ==
=== Balkans ===
The team examined books by anti-nationalist writers Aleksandar Tišma, Milo Dor, and Edo Popović, and of nationalist writers like Vuk Drašković. The team noted that "in the case of the Balkan literature in the 1980s, the fact that Albanian-Serbian love stories and friendships across the ethnic divide vanished from the book stands was seen as speaking loudly indeed. They were replaced by what Wertheimer’s team classifies as revisionist, nationalist historical novels. Many of these works emphasised the Kosovo myth."

=== Algeria ===
The team was interested in a situation in Algeria after the Arab spring, because the country was stable and "remained mostly silent". They found that Algerian books tells different story:

Amar Mezdad's 2014 novel Yiwen Wass Deg Tefsut (A Spring Day) follows a group of people who join a demonstration that is violently dispersed. Saïd Sadi's 1991 diary novel Algérie, L'Échec Recommence was reissued in the northern Algerian Kabylia region in 2015, revisiting the Berber spring of the 1980s. And there was Boualem Sansal's 2015 novel 2084: La Fin Du Monde, an Orwell-referencing dystopia in which an Islamist dictator uses religion to control the language and minds of his people. A former high-ranking government official who has criticised the rise of political Islam in Algeria, Sansal's books had been banned in his home country since 2006, but were still widely read – making this a prime example of literature’s ability to touch a nerve.

Sansal's novel 2084 was the highest-scoring book analyzed by the team, scored 25 points.

Analysis was proven right when in February 2019 "protests broke out in Algiers and several other cities, culminating in the resignation of President Abdelaziz Bouteflika".

=== Azerbaijan ===
The team found that by the end of 2019 "the culture ministry of Azerbaijan had recently supplied libraries in Georgia with books carrying explicit anti-Armenian messages, such as the works of poet Khalil Rza Uluturk. There were signs, he warned, that Azerbaijan was ramping up propaganda efforts in the brewing territorial conflict with its neighbouring former Soviet republic."

In 2020 there were a war in Nagorno-Karabakh with more than 6000 casualties.
