= 2084 =

2084 may refer to:

- 2084 is a number in the 2000–2999 range

== Time ==
- 2084 CE (year), MMLXXXIV, the year A.D. 2084
- 2084 BC (year), the year 2084 BCE

== Places ==
- 2084 Okayama, Asteroid #2084, also called Okayama
- Farm to Market Road 2084, Texas Road 2084, in the U.S.A.

== People ==
- Tom Tom MMLXXXIV (musician), a music arranger who worked on the 2002 Liam Hayes album Fed (album)

== Entertainment works/titles ==
- Robotron: 2084, a 1982 video game in the Robotron series of videogames
- 2084: The End of the World, a 2015 French-language novel by Boualem Sansal
- 2084 (film), a 1984 science fiction film
- 2084, a comics work by Goran Parlov

== Other uses ==
- SMPTE ST 2084, standard #2084 from SMTPE, also called Perceptual Quantizer (PQ)
- United Nations Security Council Resolution 2084, resolution #2084 passed by the U.N. Security Council
- Partnership to Build America Act (H.R. 2084), a federal bill introduced by U.S. Representative John Delaney, see Political positions of John Delaney

== See also ==
- Solar eclipse of January 7, 2084
- Solar eclipse of July 3, 2084
- Solar eclipse of December 27, 2084
- January 2084 lunar eclipse, on the 22nd
