= National Polytechnic School (Algeria) =

School in Algiers, Algeria

Coordinates: 36.7232°N 3.1508°E

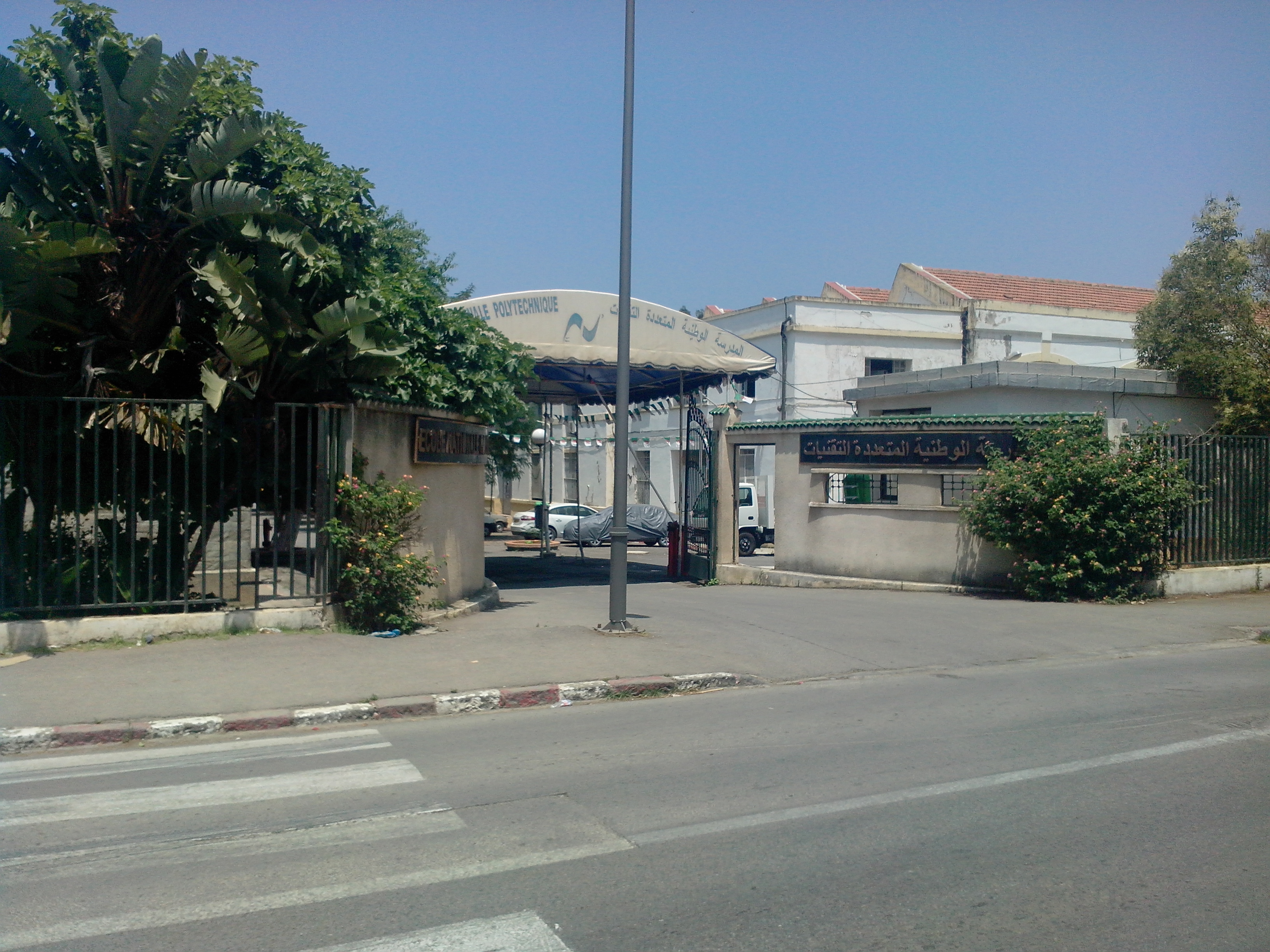
- Seal of the ENP
- general secretary: Mohamed LAMDJAD
- IT Manager: Nasser-Eddine CHAROUF
- Type: Polytechnic School
- Established: 1925
- President: Abdelouahab MEKHALDI
- Director: Abdelouahab MEKHALDI
- Students: ~1400
- Location: El Harrach, Algiers, Algeria
- Campus: Bouraoui
- Colors: Blue
- Website: www.enp-alger.edu.dz

The National Polytechnic School or École Nationale Polytechnique (ENP) is an engineering school founded in 1925. The architectural diversity of the buildings reflects the different extensions and enlargements of the areas of expertise, teachings and research. A common misconception is to call the school the National Polytechnic School of Algiers while its official name is the National Polytechnic School abbreviated in French as ENP.

The school was created in 1925 under the name of "Institut industriel d'Algérie", the aim of this establishment was to train senior technicians for large public services and industrial and public works companies. After the Second World War a training of aeronautical technicians in North Africa was created the ENPA, National Professional School of the Air by General Martin whose alumni continue to maintain a historical site and memory. Closed because of the Second World War, the school was reopened under the name École nationale d'ingénieurs d'Algérie. In 1962, the ENP hosted the first meetings of the provisional government of Algeria. After independence, it was transformed into the National Polytechnic School by the ministerial decree of June 25, 1963.

== Admission & Academic programs ==
The National Polytechnic School offers a preparatory class in science and technology (CPST-ENP), accessible directly after the baccalaureate, an average of more than 17.00/20 is required for the branches Mathematics & experimental science and 18.00/20 for the technical branch Mathematics.

Admission to the ENP's engineering program is through a selective competitive examination called the Concours National Commun d'admission aux grandes écoles d'ingénieurs, among students in science and technology preparatory classes. Polytechnique finally receives a little less than 200 students each year, it is the most selective engineering school in Algeria.

The engineering courses offered by the National Polytechnic School of Algiers are provided in order to produce Engineers and Researchers able to imagine, design and develop innovative ideas, products, processes as well as building the future as well as the diversity of the Algerian economy.

== The specialties of engineers ==
- Hydraulics Engineering (added in 1998)
- Green Hydrogen (added in 2023 )
- Civil Engineering
- Chemical Engineering
- Material Engineering
- Mining Engineering
- Industrial Engineering
- Mechanical Engineering
- Environmental Engineering
- Electrical Engineering
- Electronics
- QHSE
- Automation
- Data Science and Artificial Intelligence (added in 2020)

Specializations in hydraulics, green hydrogen, and mining have been highly recommended since 2022, in response to the challenges faced in terms of water and energy in Algeria.

== Notable alumni ==
- Abdelaziz Ouabdesselam, founder of the school.
- Mohand Aoudjehane, former professor and director of the school.
- Mohand Ait-ali, former director of the school and professor emeritus
- Pr Chems Eddine Chitour, professor of thermodynamics and former director of the school.
- Radhia Cousot, computer scientist known for inventing abstract interpretation
- Khaled Mounir Berrah, former director of the school.
- Mohamed Oujaout, professor of mathematics at the school, and Minister of National Education.
- Azzedine Oussedik, director general of the Algerian Space Agency.
- Saïd Mekbel, journalist and columnist who was a former teacher at the school.
- Youcef Yousfi, Minister of Energy and Mines and former professor at the school.
- Hadji Baba Ammi, Minister Delegate of Budget and Prospective and former President of the Board of Directors of the Algerian Bank of Foreign Trade.
- Noureddine Moussa, Minister of Housing and Urban Development.
- Lakhdar Rakhroukh, Algerian Minister of Public Works, Hydraulics and Basic Infrastructure.
- Boualem Sansal, writer and essayist.
- Salah Belaadi, former DG of the National Agency for the Development of University Research
- António Dembo, president, UNITA rebel movement in Angola
- Rachid Deriche, researcher in computer science.
- Karim Oumnia, CEO Glagla Shoes.
- Saïd Bouteflika, brother and advisor to the former president.
- Noureddine Cherouati, former CEO of Sonatrach.
- Mohamed Meziane, former CEO of Sonatrach.
- Amine Mazouzi, former CEO of Sonatrach.
- Abdelmoumen Ould Kaddour, former CEO of Sonatrach.
- Mustapha Achaïbou, former CEO of the telephone operator Mobilis.
- Zidane Merah, director general of the public establishment Algérienne des eaux (ADE).

== See also ==
- Universities in Algeria by province
- University of Tlemcen
