= Political positions of John Delaney =

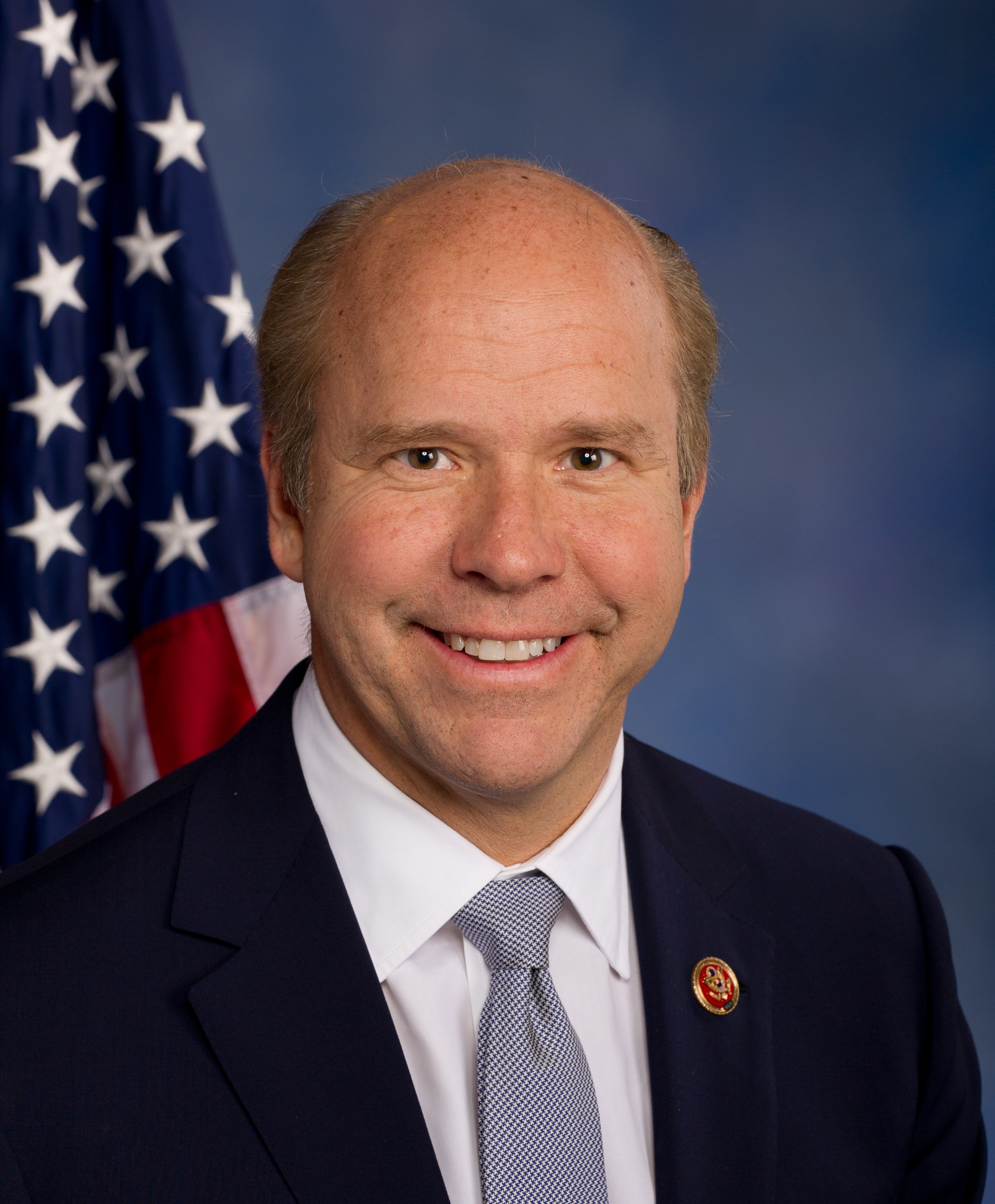
John Delaney

John Delaney is a Democrat who served as the U.S. representative representing Maryland's 6th congressional district from 2013 to 2019. He announced his 2020 campaign for President of the United States on July 28, 2017. He suspended his campaign on January 31, 2020.

Delaney is often considered a centrist, and has touted his own bipartisan credentials as evidence of his ability to transcend the partisan divide. He has stated that he regards bipartisan cooperation as being of greater importance than progressive goals. Nevertheless, Delaney has also proclaimed himself to be a "progressive" interested in creating "real–not political–progress." Delaney has also dubbed himself a "pragmatic progressive" and a "pragmatic idealist".

In his 2018 book Right Answer, Delaney wrote,

While my policy instincts are often considered progressive, my political instincts have always been bipartisan.

In the House of Representatives, Delaney was a member of the New Democrat Coalition, a moderate and "pro-growth" Congressional Member Organization.

Despite being frequently referred to as a "moderate", Delaney has not entirely identified as such. Delaney has remarked,

People have a hard time labeling me. Some of the things they hear me talking about are on the total progressive or liberal end of the spectrum, and in other ways I'm kind of a solutions-oriented moderate who wants to get things done.

However, as a 2020 presidential candidate, Delaney has proclaimed himself to be the "most moderate" individual running for the Democratic nomination.

== Social issues ==
=== Abortion and contraception ===
Despite his Catholic background, Delaney is pro-choice. He agrees with the Roe v. Wade decision by the U.S. Supreme Court.

Delaney supports public abortion funding and supports requiring religious groups to cover birth control and abortion in employee insurance. Delaney supports the contraceptive mandate and funding Planned Parenthood.

Delaney has stated his support for repealing the Hyde Amendment, a provision that bans the use of federal funds to pay for abortions.

Delaney intends to repeal the Mexico City policy (also known as the "Global Gag Rule"), which prevents the United States from providing federal funding to non-governmental organizations which provide abortion counseling or referrals, advocate to decriminalize abortion, or expand abortion services

In 2017, Delaney voted against the Pain-Capable Unborn Child Protection Act, which would ban abortions on fetuses that over 20-weeks post-fertilization (with exceptions for saving the life of the mother and for cases of rape and incest).

He has received 100% ratings from pro-choice groups such as NARAL Pro-Choice America, Planned Parenthood, and Population Connection.

He has received 0% ratings from anti-abortion (pro-life) groups such as National Right to Life Committee, Campaign for Working Families, and Family Policy Alliance.

He also received a 20% rating from the Democratic anti-abortion (pro-life) organization Democrats for Life of America.

=== Civil rights ===
==== LGBTQ rights ====
Delaney has supported same-sex marriage. He has voted for enforcement against anti-gay discrimination in public schools. He has voted for numerous other bills that aim to curtail LGBT discrimination. He has received the top score of 100 from the Human Rights Campaign for his support of equality-related legislation, In noting this recognition, Delaney reasserted that he believes, "No one should be discriminated against because of who they are or who they love". He was a member of the LGBT Equality Caucus beginning in 2017.

Delaney supports the Equality Act.

Delaney supports the Obergefell v. Hodges Supreme Court decision.

Delaney supports the inclusion of transgender personnel in the United States military.

==== Women's rights ====
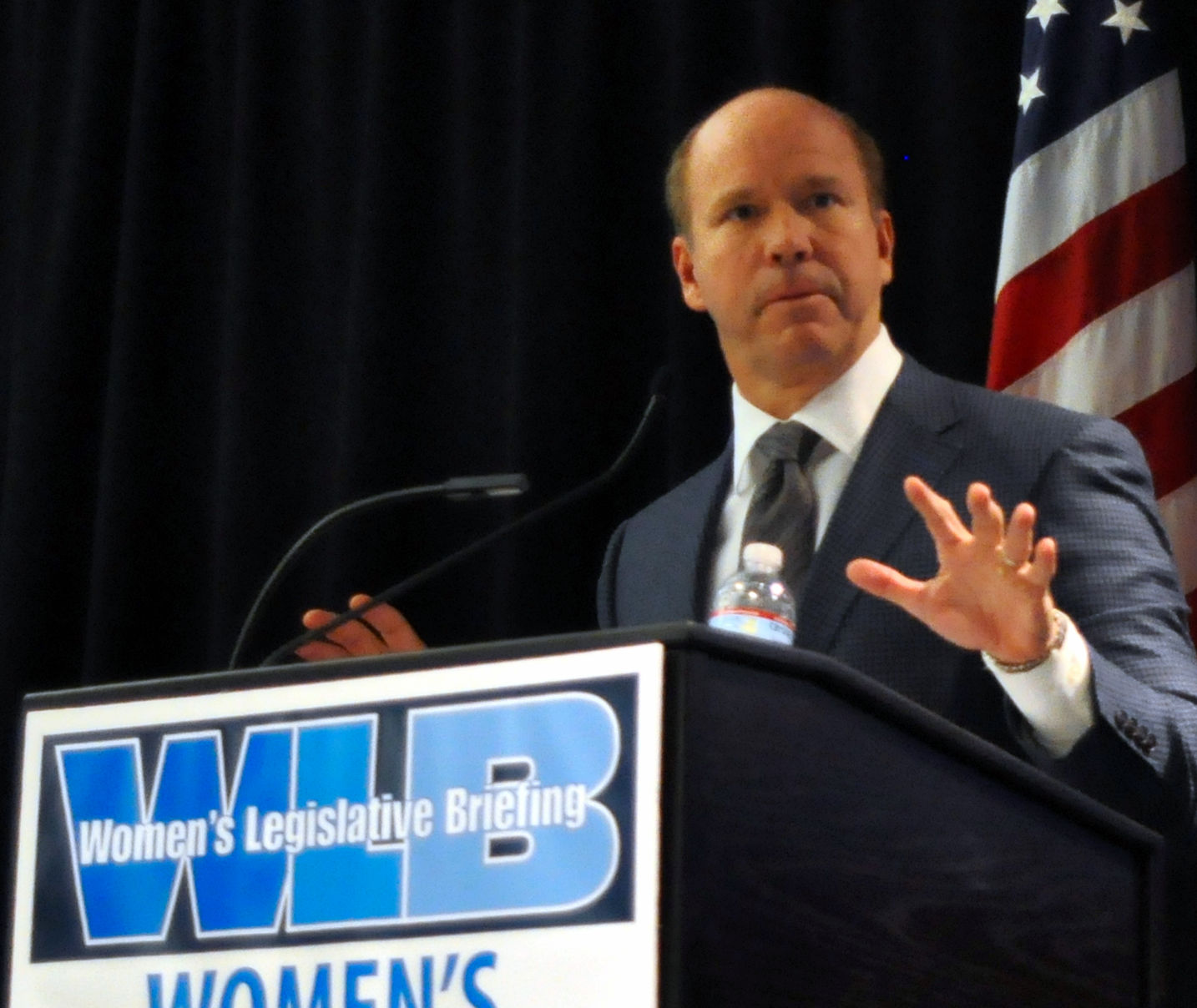
Delaney speaking at a Women's Legislative Briefing-sponsored event in 2017

On his congressional web portal, Delaney noted, "It is time to acknowledge the simple fact that women's rights are human rights, and we must use this approach as we address the pressing issues facing women today."

Delaney has been endorsed as "preferred" by Feminist Majority Foundation, indicating a "pro-women's rights" stance.

Delaney released a Women's Rights Plan as a presidential candidate.

Delaney supports protecting the "fundamental rights" of women and ensuring that women are treated equally in American society. He also champions working to support women in the developing world. He believes that critical elements needed to accomplish this include healthcare, reproductive justice, workplace fairness, working to end domestic violence, and supporting international aid programs.

He argues that sexual assault, domestic violence, and stalking should not be treated as partisan issues. In 2013, he co-sponsored the Violence Against Women Reauthorization Act. Delaney proposes closing the so-called "boyfriend loophole" by updating the Violence Against Women Act to extend the ban on convicted domestic abusers buying firearms to also cover non-spousal partners.

Delaney supports strong and extensive protections for victims of college campus sexual assault, and intends to reverse actions taken under the Trump administration which Delaney credits with weakening Title IX protections.

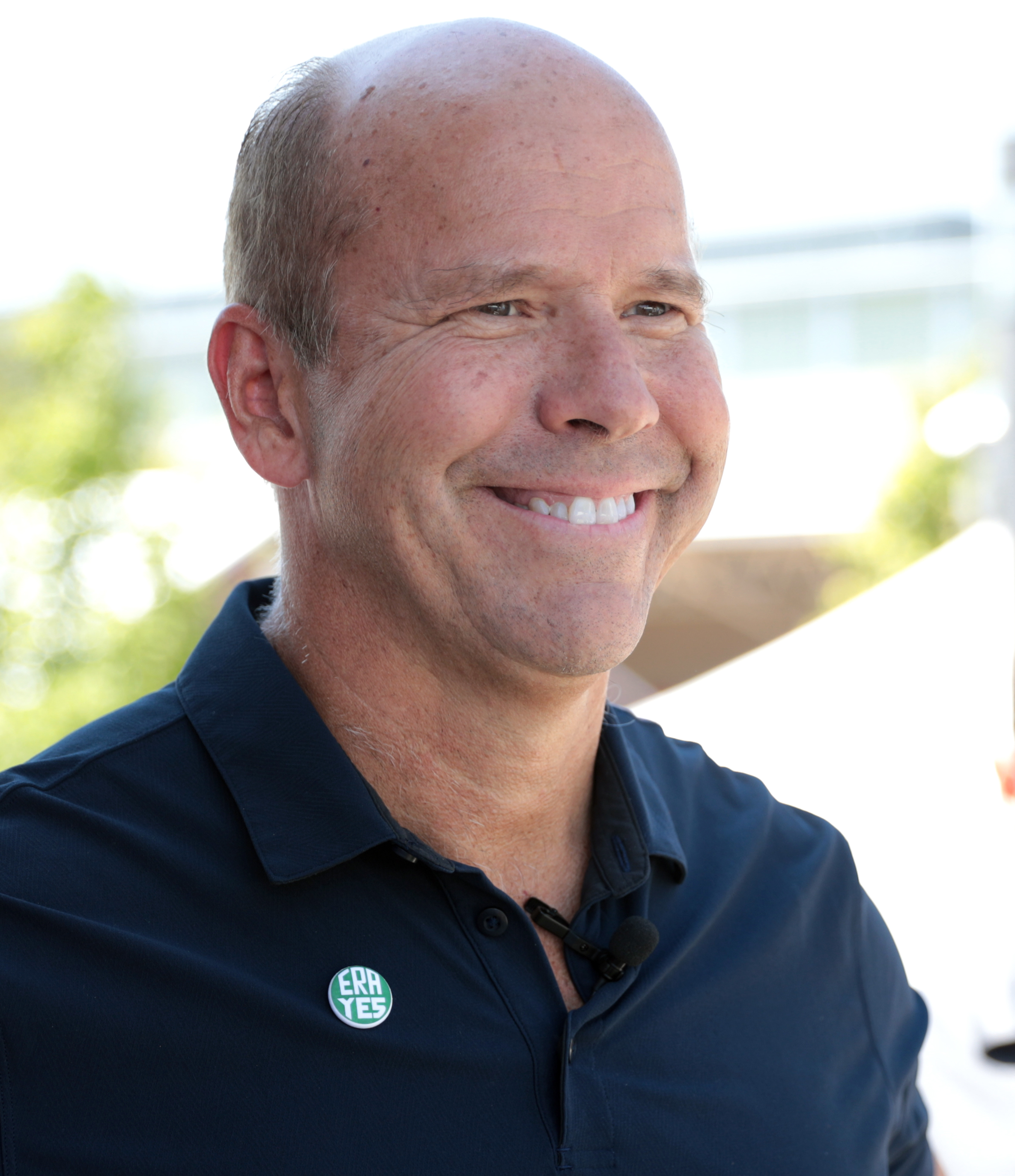
Delaney wears a button declaring support for the Equal Rights Amendment

Delaney supports the Equal Rights Amendment. In June 2013 Delaney sponsored legislation which would remove the deadline for ratification of the ERA.

Delaney has voted for enforcement against wage discrimination based on gender. He was also an original cosponsor of the Paycheck Fairness Act. He continues to support the Paycheck Fairness Act.

In tackling workplace protection against sexual harassment and gender discrimination, Delaney supports whistleblower protections and adequate funding of the Equal Employment Opportunity Commission.

Delaney believes that the United States has a role in promoting women's rights abroad.

=== Crime ===
Delaney is rated 92% by the National Association of Police Organizations, which indicates that the organization regards him to be "tough-on-crime".

Delaney supports increasing funding for programs that would ensure police departments and first responders are well funded, especially in areas with high crime rates.

==== Capital punishment ====
Delaney is in favor of abolishing the death penalty in the United States.

==== Criminal justice reform ====
Delaney believes that the United States criminal justice system has demonstrated a clear bias against people of color.

Delaney supports ending the use of for-profit prisons.

Delaney supports ending or limiting the use of money bail in the federal criminal system. He also supports urging states to pursue similar reforms. He believes that money bail is, "excessive, discriminatory, and costly for taxpayers and communities".

Delaney supports increasing funding for public defenders and recidivism reduction programs and ending mandatory minimum sentencing.

Delaney supports increasing funding for police body cameras and federal funding for de-escalation training and the Community Oriented Policing Services (COPS) program to increase community policing.

Delaney has come out in favor of Ban the Box, a campaign to remove the check box that asks job applicants if they have a criminal record on hiring applications. This seeks to enable ex-offenders to display their qualifications in the hiring process before being asked about their criminal records.

=== Drug policy ===
Delaney has received a 100% rating from Americans for Safe Access, an organization advocating for the legalization of cannabis. In his time in congress, Delaney co-sponsored seven cannabis-related pieces of legislation. These included three bills to remove cannabidiol (CBD) from the Controlled Substances Act, a bill to protect individuals participating in state-legal marijuana activities from federal interference, a bill to protect patients in medical cannabis states, and two bills to protect banks working with marijuana businesses from federal penalties. Delaney constantly voted in support of decreasing federal enforcement against marijuana and in support of federal cannabis reform. Delaney supports removing cannabis from being a Schedule I controlled substance and establishing strong and federal guidelines and taxation policies to support decisions at the state level that legalize cannabis.

In March 2018 Delaney voted in support of legislation which would grant patients with terminal illnesses the right to try unapproved treatments.

==== Opioid epidemic ====
Delaney argues that "long-term solutions" are needed to the opioid epidemic in the United States.

As a presidential candidate Delaney declared that, “opioid addiction is ravaging our nation".

Solutions that Delaney believes will address the crisis include reinforcing prevention efforts, investing in mental health care, supporting "evidence-based" treatment programs for substance use, and improving economic development.

Delaney argues that education is one of the best tools to prevent addiction. He believes it is important to ensure that patients and doctors have honest and direct discussions about opiates, and therefore he proposes requiring that physicians that prescribe opioids for use for periods longer than three days would have to have their patients sign a disclosure form which clearly outlines the addictive nature of opioids and the correlation between longer use and increased potential for addiction. Delaney would also require prescriber education on safe opioid prescribing practices.

Another step for prevention that Delaney advocates is the expansion of non-opiate pain treatments. He proposes expanded access to alternative pain management options, such as physical therapy and non-opioid medications and treatments. He proposes to continue and increase investment in medical research into non-opioid pain treatments. He supports requiring that federal, state, and private payers cover non-opioid pain treatments without significant copayments or administrative barriers.

Delaney supports bolstering federal enforcement efforts of the Drug Enforcement Administration, U.S. Customs and Border Protection, Federal Drug Administration and other agencies to reduce the supply of illegal opioids and the diversion of prescription opioids.

Delaney also proposes fueling funding for programs by establishing a new block grant for states funded by a two-cent tax on morphine milligram equivalents in prescription pain pills.

==== Prescription drug prices ====
In order to lower prices for prescription drugs, Delaney has proposed implementing a 100% excise tax on the price difference between prices paid by United States patients and the OECD average. He also proposes allowing the federal government to negotiate drug prices with pharmaceutical companies.

Delaney proposes fueling funding for programs related to opioid recovery by establishing a new block grant for states funded by a two-cent tax on morphine milligram equivalents in prescription pain pills.

=== Education ===
Delaney's presidential campaign website declares,

Education is vital to ensuring everyone has an opportunity for a successful future and Delaney intends to reinvest in educational opportunities for all. To prepare for the high-tech, high-skill economy of the future, we must prioritize education.

Delaney believes that America needs to find bipartisan agreement on fiscal challenges, but that funding high-quality education should always remain a priority.

Delaney believes that the federal government's role in elementary and secondary education system has never been more important than it is now. He believes that the public education system provides for the economic mobility that many consider to be the American Dream. However, he believes that there are improvements that need to be made in order to ensure that students are receiving high-quality education from high-quality educators. Delaney believes that the government should work to incentivize current graduates to become teachers and ensure they receive the training to make them effective in the classroom. In addition, he believes that the government has to hold its teachers and schools accountable for student performance, and make room for innovative approaches like those employed by magnet and charter schools.

Delaney supports universal preschool. Delaney argues that research shows that early investments in education show big returns in later years. He considers this to be the reason for which he has supported increased funding for Early Head Start to help ensure that all children receive high-quality preschool educations. He argues that this has been proven to close the achievement gap and help prepare all students for success in kindergarten and elementary school.

Delaney has opposed school vouchers.

He has voted for enforcement against anti-gay discrimination in public schools.

Delaney has pledged to address the educational disparity between black and white communities.

Delaney seeks to make a federal investment in STEM education.

During his 2012 congressional campaign, Delaney argued that the D.C. Opportunity Scholarship Program helps to give parents more options.

Delaney voted against the Student Success Act because it cut education funding and reduced accountability for teachers and schools.

In his presidential campaign, Delaney has pledged to work to create a program that would provide high school students with incentives to serve their country, either through military or community service.

Delaney's presidential infrastructure plan proposes the creation of a $40 billion School Infrastructure Matching Fund.

Delaney also believes that the United States government should strengthen its support for the Global Partnership for Education.

==== Higher education ====
On his congressional web portal, Delaney wrote,

Now, more than ever, getting a high quality education is essential for success. A college degree is increasingly necessary for access to high-paying jobs, and an educated workforce is essential for the United States to remain competitive in a global economy in which technology is playing a bigger and bigger role."

One of the components of Delaney's economic plan is to invest in creating a world-class education and research system for American workers.

Delaney desires to incentivize the private sector to offer employer-sponsored training and education.

==== Student debt, loans, and tuition ====
Delaney believes that, after graduating high school, every American should be able to, free of cost, attend community college or receive career technical training. He believes the first two years of college should be made free, and the next two years should have lowered costs. Delaney seeks to enact "universal Pre K-14", which, in addition to universal pre-kindergarten, would offer Americans free two-year community college or technical school educations. His plan to provide free community college or technical school to all high school graduates would require that, for states to remain eligible, they must at least maintain their funding for higher education, and for institutions to remain eligible for this program, they must have curriculums that enable students to, "transfer seamlessly to four-year public institutions in their region".

Believing that college students need affordable student loans to assure them access to higher education, Delaney voted in support of the Bipartisan Student Loan Certainty Act of 2013.

Delaney supports efforts to make college more affordable by slowing the "runaway" inflation of tuitions, funding Pell Grants, and providing affordable student loans. He does not back proposals to make college tuition free.

As part of his presidential campaign's proposed Heartland Fair Deal rural revitalization plan Delaney has proposed offering student loan forgiveness to any individuals living and working in “distressed” communities for a duration of at least 10 years.

Delaney seeks to expand income-based repayment programs for student loans that were enacted under the Obama administration.

Delaney believes that there needs to be greater oversight to ensure that career colleges and certificate programs at nonprofit institutions actually prepare their students for the workforce without requiring students to undertake unreasonable quantities of debt.

Delaney supports the gainful employment rule.

During his presidential run, Delaney proposed a plan to reduce interest rates on federal student loans and to set them equal to the interest rate on 10-year Treasury bonds. Delaney believes that the government should not make a profit off of student loans.

Students who would enroll in Delaney's proposed national service program would receive a "National Service Scholarship".

=== Energy and the environment ===
As a presidential candidate, Delaney stated that he believes that, "dealing with climate change should be a centerpiece of any campaign in the 2020 election cycle."

In his campaign for president he proposed a $4 trillion climate plan, which he declared would be focused on bringing the United States to net-zero emissions by 2025. Delaney's climate plan focuses on a carbon cap and dividend program. The six tenants of his plan are a carbon fee and dividend, direct air capture/negative emissions technology, quintupling the budget for renewable energy research, challenge grants, a "Climate Corps", a "Carbon Throughway".

Delaney's plan requires carbon capture technology at a larger scale and lower cost than is currently available.

Delaney's proposal for a Carbon Throughway would be a $20 billion infrastructure project which would create pipelines to transport captured carbon to locations for permanent sequestration and reuse.

Delaney proposal calls for the government to stop its fossil fuel subsidies and to instead made a $5 billion annual investment in negative emissions technology.

Delaney has pledged that, on his first day as president, he would reenter the United States into the Paris Agreement.

As part of his National Service Program proposal, Delaney proposes the establishment of a Climate Corps that would have community-based organizations and local businesses partner with the federal government to address environmental concerns.

Delaney's presidential infrastructure plan also includes the establishment of a $60 billion Climate Infrastructure Fund.

As a congressman Delaney wrote on his congressional web portal,

We can't compete in a 21st century economy with a 20th century energy policy. We need to develop a national energy policy focused on two goals: 1) becoming a global leader in domestic energy production and alternative energy technology and 2) properly responding to climate change. For this reason, I am proud to be a member of the House Sustainable Energy and Environment Coalition."

Delaney believes that increasing the production of sustainable energy is not only beneficial to the environment, but is also beneficial to the economy. He wrote on his congressional web portal, "Just as the global economy in the 20th century was profoundly shaped by oil and gas production, the nations that provide new energy solutions that reflect the realities of climate change will thrive in the 21st century." As a congressman Delaney worked to establish a green energy sector along the I-270 corridor in Maryland.

Delaney supports regulating greenhouse gas emissions.

He believes that it is the nation's greatest interest to fund research and development for alternative energy and provide adequate funding to the Army Corps of Engineers, who help build and maintain our energy infrastructure. A component of Delaney's economic plan is to develop a national energy policy that encourages domestic energy production with a goal towards becoming an alternative energy leader.

As a congressman Delaney had been a cosponsor of multiple pieces of legislation which encourage further development of alternative energy sectors in the United States.

Delaney has supported instituting a revenue-neutral national carbon tax. While he favors moving towards cleaner energy to combat climate change, he also places a high priority on assisting the workers and communities that will be disrupted as the nation moves away from coal energy. Delaney authored the Tax Pollution, Not Profits Act, which would establish a carbon tax and use those funds to 1) lower the corporate tax rate 2) provide extensive benefits to displaced coal workers including health care, early retirement, retraining and relocation expenses so they can find new jobs and 3) provide benefits to low and middle income Americans.

Delaney has supported the Production Tax Credit for renewable energy.

As a congressman Delaney proposed the State's Choice Act, which was intended to allow states to develop an individual response to carbon pollution that would use market forces to drive down pollution.

Delaney stated that he believed it was unlikely that congress would pass the 2019 Green New Deal resolution introduced by congresswoman Alexandria Ocasio-Cortez. He voiced support for, "the energy behind the Green New Deal," but opposition to the resolution itself. Delaney has said, “I actually don't think the Green New Deal is the way to go. The reason is that I want to do something about fixing climate change tomorrow. I don't want to tie it to fixing health care." Delaney has also criticized the impact he believes the Green New Deal would have on working-class families.

==== Nuclear power ====
Surmising his stance on nuclear power, Delaney has remarked, “Let's put it this way, I'm not anti-nuclear because I don't think you can be anti-nuclear and pro dealing with climate change." Delaney wants to invest in smaller and more stable nuclear power plants.

==== Preservation ====
Delaney voted against the Young amendment to the 2018 farm bill, which will make it so that the "roadless area conservation rule" established under part 294 of title 36, Code of Federal Regulations (or successor regulations) shall not apply to any National Forest System land in the State of Alaska.

=== Families and children ===
Delaney has supported instituting greater protections for the victims of domestic violence. He has also previously supported providing six weeks of paid parental leave to federal employees. He has pledged as a presidential candidate to provide a new paid family leave program that would provide eight weeks of paid time off annually.

Delaney also believes that the United States government should strengthen its support for maternal and child health abroad.

=== Government reform ===
Delaney has co-sponsored legislation that would strengthen the STOCK Act. He also co-sponsored legislation to extend the lobbying ban to five years.

In 2013, Delaney was an original cosponsor of legislation that would explicitly make political targeting at the IRS a fireable offense.

==== Campaign and election reform ====
Delaney has supported term limits.

Delaney has supported redistricting reforms to address issues relating to gerrymandering.

In 2017 Delaney introduced the Open Our Democracy Act, which would make election day a federal holiday, make all congressional primary elections open elections (so that all eligible voters can participate in them, regardless of party affiliation), and curb partisan gerrymandering by requiring independent commissions to draw the districts in each state.

In his presidential stump-speeches, Delaney has reportedly adopted gerrymandering and campaign finance reform as two of the key concerns he wishes to address.

In his campaign for president he has vowed to refuse corporate PAC donations.

Delaney supports passing a constitutional amendment to overturn the Citizens United v. FEC Supreme Court decision.

Delaney co-sponsored the Government by the People Acts of 2014 and 2017.

Delaney supports the Voting Rights Advancement Act, which would require states with a history of violating voting rights to get Department of Justice approval before being allowed to make any alterations to voting requirements election procedures.

Delaney supports automatic voter registration and same day registration.

=== Gun control ===
Delaney supports restrictions on gun purchases.

In December 2017, Delaney voted in opposition to concealed carry reciprocity.

In 2017, Delaney proclaimed to have never taken contributions from the National Rifle Association of America. The NRA has rated Delaney's voting record at 7 out of 100.

Delaney considers the top-three gun control priorities to be passing legislation for universal background checks, limiting the availability of “certain high-powered, military-style assault weapons” and passing a national red flag law.

Delaney supports closing "loopholes" which allows private individuals to sell firearms (such as through the internet, at gun shows, and to friends and family) without first running background checks to verify that buyers are not legally prohibited from purchasing firearms.

Delaney also believes that an American mental health crisis is a contributing factor in the nation's gun epidemic, and therefore mental health needs to be part of the gun conversation.

In his presidential campaign, Delaney released a gun safety plan. Delaney's plan called for universal background checks, Universal Background Checks, a ban on assault weapons, a ban on bump stocks, enacting a "National Extreme Risk Protection Order Law", and providing federal funding for gun violence research. Delaney's plan also calls for closing the so-called "boyfriend loophole" by updating the Violence Against Women Act to extend the ban on convicted domestic abusers buying firearms to also cover non-spousal partners.

=== Healthcare ===
On his congressional web portal, Delaney wrote,

Providing quality health care for their loved ones is one of the challenges American families face daily. Advancements in medicine mean that Americans are living longer than ever, and with those advancements comes a responsibility to maintain access to care. I believe that quality, affordable health care should be a right for every American and not just a privilege for the few.

In 2013, Delaney sponsored the Medical Foods Equity Act of 2013 (H.R. 3665; 113th Congress), which would extend coverage of medical foods, vitamins, and amino acids to those with metabolic disorders.

In August 2014 he signed the Ebola Relief Resolution which called on the United States and the international community to provide an additional $500M and 3,000 addition troops to fight the Western African Ebola virus epidemic. In October of that year, Delaney criticized partisan politicalization of the congressional response to the ebola virus epidemic declaring, “This is a health care crisis and there should be nothing about politics involved here.”

Delaney sponsored legislation merging Alzheimer's diagnosis and care benefits of the Affordable Care Act.

In March 2018 Delaney voted in support of legislation which would grant patients with terminal illnesses the right to try unapproved treatments.

Delaney supports providing federal funding for the reproductive healthcare provider Planned Parenthood.

Delaney supports the implementation of "pay for success" programs similar to the Nurse-Family Partnership program in South Carolina in order to help improve health outcomes during first two years of a child's life.

In order to help address the opioid crisis through opioid addiction prevention, by improving access to opioid alternatives, Delaney supports requiring that federal, state, and private payers cover non-opioid pain treatments without significant copayments or administrative barriers.

Delaney wants to create new and improve upon existing incentives like National Health Service Corps in order to attract medical professionals to underserved communities.

From his business career, Delaney has experience in the private-sector of healthcare. In 1993, he co-founded Health Care Financial Partners, which made loans available to smaller-sized health care service providers purportedly ignored by larger banks. HCFP became public in 1996, and became an NYSE company in 1998. Health Care Financial Partners was acquired by Heller Financial in 1999.

==== Healthcare reform ====
A vocal supporter of the Affordable Care Act, he has hailed it as an important step in the right direction. He lauds it for allowing young adults to stay on their parents' health plan for longer and helping seniors to save money on their prescription drug costs. He also lauds it for allowing children with preexisting conditions have access to health plans, and for expanding access for adults with preexisting conditions. He believes that it helps ensure access to affordable quality healthcare.

However, Delaney also feels that as a law, the Affordable Care Act is imperfect. While he has continually voted against efforts to repeal the Affordable Care Act, he also believes that an effort must be taken to examine it and take steps to further reduce long term healthcare costs. He believes that the government needs to address long term challenges of the Affordable Care Act in order to ensure that a strong healthcare system will continue provide quality and affordable care for future generations.

He prefers taking a more incremental approach to healthcare reform. He believes it is imperative to first remedy the Patient Protection and Affordable Care Act before implementing a fully paid-for universal healthcare plan.

Opposed to pushing for single-payer healthcare, he proposes expanding Medicare coverage.

In an interview, Delaney was quoted as saying,

With progressives I'd say, "We want the same thing. Let's just talk about how we get there." So I am for single-payer, but I am for single-payer evolving from the context of the market we have now. My approach is to fix the Affordable Care Act and then take it further with probably some kind of public option.

Delaney believes that if healthcare, as well as retirement, is not tied to employment, individuals will feel more secure and be more likely to enter into entrepreneurial endeavors.

Delaney has stated that he has a proposal to provide universal health coverage by improving the United States' existing health legislation. Delaney has said that he believes that healthcare relies on three measures: access, quality, and cost.

Delaney believes that America's goals for reforming healthcare should be to:

1. Make sure the nation has universal access
2. Do things to get the rate of growth of healthcare expenditures in line with inflation
3. Eliminate the disparities that exist in the healthcare system.

As a presidential candidate Delaney has proposed that, in order to make healthcare access "truly universal", a new national health program would be implemented for all Americans younger than 65 providing them with a government funded public plan. At age 65, individuals would transition to traditional medicare.

In Delaney's plan, individuals would be able to opt out of the public plan and instead receive a tax credit to buy private insurance. Delaney has stated, “I envisioned a universal health care market where everyone gets health care as a right, but it's kind of a public/private market. There's private insurance and government insurance kind of working together.” Traditional Medicare would be preserved. Delaney aims to protect reforms brought by the Affordable Care Act, including guaranteed coverage of preexisting conditions and essential health benefits.

Delaney seeks "portable benefits", including detaching health care from employment, thereby allowing for Americans to seek new jobs and new opportunities without being made to feel bound to an individual employer.

Delaney intends for his plan to guarantee coverage for pregnancy and maternal care.

Delaney has not supported the "Medicare for All" proposal for achieving universal healthcare. In part, he opposes this because he believes that rural hospitals would struggle to receive adequate funding under such a plan. He has declared that he believes that Medicare for All is, "not good policy, nor is it good politics". He considers the "Medicare for All" bill, as introduced to the Senate, to be, "fundamentally bad health care policy".

Delaney has declared he believes, “Socialist approaches to medicine aren't just bad policy, they're political disasters."

Delaney has criticized Medicaid programs across the United States for failing to adequately reimbursing services, consequentially creating a limited provider network. Rather than keeping it separate, Delaney plans to absorb Medicaid into his universal healthcare proposal.

==== Immunizations and vaccinations ====
In 2017, Delaney co-sponsored a congressional resolution, "recognizing the importance of vaccinations and immunizations".

In a 2019 response to inquiry from BuzzFeed News, Delaney commented on his position on vaccinations saying, "I think they are necessary". Commenting on controversy surrounding vaccines and autism, Delaney stated that he does not believe that vaccines are cause of autism. He also stated that he believes that exemptions for receiving vaccines should be considered based upon the nature of particular diseases. For instance, he believes that highly contagious diseases, such as measles, only medical exemptions should be allowed.

==== Medical research ====
The National Institutes of Health was located within the congressional district which Delaney represented. Delaney pledged himself to be an ally of the Institutes' research efforts, including those of the National Cancer Institute.

As part of his proposed response to the opioid epidemic, Delaney proposes to continue and increase investment in medical research into non-opioid pain treatments.

==== Mental health ====
Delaney supports improving access in the United States to coverage for mental health. As a presidential candidate, Delaney released a Mental Health Plan.

Delaney also believes that an American mental health crisis is a contributing factor in the nation's gun epidemic, and therefore mental health needs to be part of the gun conversation.

Delaney supports enforcing and expanding mental health parity laws.

Delaney proposes requiring federal, state, and private payers to cover medication-assisted treatment and behavioral health counseling without significant copayments or administrative barriers.

Delaney supports investing in workforce deployment and training for mental healthcare workers.

=== Immigration and border security ===
On his congressional web portal, Delaney wrote,

Immigration reform is a moral and economic imperative. I am strong supporter of comprehensive immigration reform. Reform should secure our border and create a path to citizenship for the more than 11 million undocumented immigrants who are already here, pursuing the American Dream for their families. Second-class status for anyone, is not who we are as a country.

Delaney believes that comprehensive border reform needs to include the establishment of a clear path to citizenship for undocumented immigrants and DREAMers, investments in effective border security (including high tech solutions, fencing, increased security personnel, and improvements at port of entry), reform to the visa program for guest workers, and an increase in the refugee cap for resettlement in the United States.

One of the components of Delaney's economic plan is immigration reform that would allow the best and brightest to work for American companies. He has written, "In America we have a tremendous advantage: the best and the brightest from around the world want to come here. We should take advantage of this singular fact." He believes that immigration reform will help drive a more competitive American economy. He points to statistics to support this hypothesis. One such statistic is that 40% of Fortune 500 companies were founded by immigrants or children of immigrants. Another is that in Maryland, 21% of business owners are immigrants and 26% of STEM graduates are foreign born.

Delaney has been a strong supporter of the Border Security, Economic Opportunity, and Immigration Modernization Act of 2013, which passed in the Senate.

In 2017, he voted against Kate's Law (HR 3004), which would increase criminal penalties for individuals that are in the United States illegally and have been convicted of certain crimes, been deported, and have then re-entered the country illegally. He also voted against the No Sanctuary For Criminals Act (HR 3003), which would withhold federal funding from localities and states that are so-called sanctuary cities/states.

Delaney was a cosponsor of multiple versions of the SOLVE Act of 2017 which would have nullified the Trump travel ban.

Delaney opposes the border wall which President Trump has proposed.

As a presidential candidate, Delaney outlined a plan to deal with what he dubbed to be "border crisis". His plan entailed working with the Mexican government and countries of the Northern Triangle of Central America to address issues within the region.

==== DACA/DREAM Act ====
Delaney supports the establishment of a clear path to citizenship for DREAMers.

Delaney opposes Trump's plan to rescind Deferred Action for Childhood Arrivals (DACA).

Delaney referred to Trump's decision to repeal DACA as "cruel, heartless and mean-spirited". He added,

President Trump has repeatedly shown that he lacks a moral compass and subjecting individuals who were brought here as children to the immediate threat of deportation is inhumane. ... Congress should call Trump's bluff and quickly pass the bipartisan DREAM Act. Republicans control both chambers of Congress, and now it is time for GOP leaders to put country first and actually move forward and protecting a policy they say they support.

Delaney wrote on his Facebook account,

Deporting 800,000 DACA recipients is a cruel and dark chapter in our democracy. I fully support the rule of law. But let's not forget that across time, people have hidden behind "the law" to do bad things that undermine the very promise of our nation. We must come together in Congress to take bold, bipartisan action to support DREAMers.

==== Refugees ====
Delaney supports increasing refugee cap for resettlement in the United States.

Delaney voted in support of the American SAFE Act of 2015, which would have established substantial barriers against the admittance of refugees from Iraq and Syria.

=== National service program ===
Delaney has proposed beginning a voluntary program in which young Americans would participate in some form of national service. Such a program would be modeled on AmeriCorps. Delaney has proposed beginning such a program by enrolling 5% of all graduating high school seniors in his proposed program's inaugural year. It would allow high schoolers to involve themselves in working on national projects, such as improving local infrastructure, retrofitting buildings, and building parks. They would work with private companies, labor groups, as well as nonprofits and community organizations and be provided with pay, which would vary depending upon the cost of living in their region.

Types of service would include military service, community service, infrastructure apprenticeships, and the "Climate Corps". Students who would enroll in the program would receive a "National Service Scholarship".

=== Social Security ===
Delaney strongly opposes cutting or privatizing social security. He opposes personal retirement accounts. He has been given a 90% rating by the Alliance for Retired Americans, indicating a pro-Trust Fund stance.

On July 26, 2017, Delaney introduced the Social Security Commission Act of 2017 (H.R.3423) to Congress. The bill would allocate $2,000,000 to establish legislative branch a commission to be known as the "Commission on Long Term Social Security Solvency". The duty of the commission would be to, within a year of being created, submit a report to Congress that would include recommendations and proposals for legislation to achieve solvency in the United States Social Security program for at least the following 75 years.

In a September 6, 2017, Delaney wrote an op-ed in the Huffington Post defending his proposal. In the article, he wrote that the proposed bill

has only one goal: ensuring the fiscal health of this wonderful program so that we can avoid drastic benefit cuts. Isn't that what we are supposed to do?

Delaney also wrote that he believes,

that Social Security is vital and that the program's benefits are more important than ever. That's precisely why I've proudly introduced this legislation in each of my three terms in Congress. The legislation would create a bipartisan commission for the purpose of making sure Social Security is solvent and capable of delivering benefits for the next 75 years. ... Social Security is not broken. Social Security is not a pyramid scheme. Social Security should not be privatized. My legislation is grounded in the facts that the Social Security Trustees have made abundantly clear for years: the ratio of retirees to workers has increased, and people are living longer. In the short term, Social Security is in stable condition, but the Trustees have stated that Social Security will only be able to pay out full benefits until 2035. I believe to my core that letting drastic benefit cuts take place because we lacked the courage to solve this problem would be immoral. That's why I'm proud to author this bill.

Delaney collaborated with Republican Tom Cole on this effort. Delaney has claimed that the proposal would follow the model that Ronald Reagan and Tip O'Neill utilized in the 1980s with the Greenspan Commission, for which Delaney credits them with having successfully extended the lifespan of Social Security by 50 years.

Delaney has also proposed raising the cap on Social Security taxes.

=== Technology ===
==== Artificial intelligence ====
Delaney was the founder and co-chair of the House Artificial Intelligence Caucus. He desires to shape a policy on AI that would 1) encourage more investment in research and to make sure that the United States is the global leader in innovation; 2) make sure workers benefit and the workforce is prepared for the new kinds of jobs being created; 3) make sure that sure AI programs aren't biased; 4) protect civil liberties, privacy and individual rights.

As a presidential candidate, Delaney released an artificial intelligence plan. Delaney's artificial intelligence plan seeks to prepare the United States for the future of work in a number of ways, including by upgrading educational curriculums to guarantee that the United States has technical talent necessary for the jobs of the future. He also desires to incentivize the private sector to offer employer-sponsored training and education. He also seeks to support public-private artificial intelligence partnerships in order to promote coordination between the public and private sectors. Delaney's artificial intelligence plan also deals with national security, privacy, and programming bias.

Delaney believes that it is necessary for the United States to have an artificial intelligence strategy that, "will allow every sector of our economy to benefit from technological change," arguing that, "by understanding the true effects of AI and other forms of innovation, our government can help manage the transition into the increasingly automated modern economy and minimize the disruption for American workers."

==== Digital privacy ====
Delaney supports creating federal digital privacy legislation modeled upon the California Consumer Privacy Act.

Delaney desires to revise the Children's Online Privacy Protection Act (COPPA) to ban the collection of personal data of any individual under the age of 16 in absence of their permission.

Delaney wants to prohibit companies from refusing to provide service to individuals who have opted-out of data collection or who request for their collected data to be deleted.

==== Net Neutrality ====
Delaney supports the policy of net neutrality. Delaney prefers to see broadband be regulated by the Federal Communications Commission under Title II (as a common carrier). As a presidential candidate he has declared that, "In Congress, I co-sponsored the Save Net Neutrality Act and as President will fight for an open and equal internet and make reinstatement of these rules a priority of my Administration."

=== Veterans affairs ===
The first bill that Delaney introduced in Congress was the Veterans Advisory Committee on Education Improvement Act (H.R. 2011). This would enhance the job training and education opportunities available to veterans.

Delaney has supported legislation such as the Veterans Mental Health Accessibility Act (H.R. 1725), the Vulnerable Veterans Housing Reform Act (H.R. 1742) and the 21st Century Health Care for Heroes Act (H.R. 2590).

During debate of the National Defense Authorization Act, Delaney offered an amendment to increase funding for Fisher House, which provides free lodging near hospitals for military families when servicemen and veterans are receiving care. His amendment increased funding from $4 million to $20 million and would allow four new Fisher Houses to be built across the country, providing lodging for approximately 2,000 additional military families per year. In 2013, Delaney sponsored the Veterans' Advisory Committee on Education Improvement Act, which would have extend through the end of 2015 the Veterans' Advisory Committee on Education and changed its membership. That same year, Delaney sponsored the Medical Leave for Disabled Veterans Act (H.R. 5165; 114th Congress), which would relax the criteria for eligible veterans to qualify for FMLA to seek medical treatment for their service-connected disabilities.

Delaney voted in support of the Department of Veterans Affairs Management Accountability Act of 2014.

=== Welfare and poverty ===
Delaney has stated that it is his belief that America's government should be, "engaging in the transformation work of bettering lives". He has stated,

as a Democrat, I believe that government should play an active role in improving peoples lives—but it can't, and shouldn't do it alone.

Delaney strongly supports the Department of Agriculture's Supplemental Nutrition Assistance Program. Delaney, in April 2013, sponsored legislation to maintain the program. In 2018, Delaney voted against the Faso amendment to the 2018 Farm Bill, which provides states the flexibility to contract out administrative functions of the program.

Delaney voted against requiring that recipients of welfare must maintain work.

Delaney is a proponent of social impact bonds (also known as "pay for success financing").

== Economic issues ==
In his business career Delaney was the founder of two publicly traded companies in the financial services sector. Delaney was, at one point, the only former CEO of a publicly traded company serving in Congress.

He claims that the lens through which he analyzes economic policy is competitiveness. He considers how the United States can position its businesses and workers to compete on a global market.

Delaney supports capitalism over socialism. As a candidate for the Democratic presidential nomination Delaney has argued that, "If the party starts embracing kind of, if you will, socialism in a pure form, I think that's a really big mistake. Because it's not good policy, and it's definitely not good politics."

In September 2017, Delaney stated, "Every minute the Democratic party is not putting forth kind of an exciting vision around jobs, pay, opportunity is a missed opportunity. For the Democrats to win, we just can't say over and over again how bad Trump is or how bad the Republican party is ... and we need to show people there's a better alternative."

Delaney believes that the United States needs a vibrant private sector in order to create long-term job growth and a strong middle class. Delaney supports policies that encourage entrepreneurship, innovation, and a better climate for business. In September 2017, Delaney stated, "In the private sector you know the facts don't lie, so you have to deal with the facts that are in front of you. You focus on the future. Because you know that's what really matters. Politics is way too much about re-litigation of the past."

Delaney believes that there is role for government in making the national economy more competitive. He believes that the healthiest economies in the world are those where the public and private sectors collaborate. Delaney has proposed a "competitiveness agenda" with five key components:

1. investing in a world-class education and research system for American workers
2. developing a national energy policy that encourages domestic energy production with a goal towards becoming an alternative energy leader
3. immigration reform so that the best and brightest can work for American companies
4. infrastructure investment to rebuild roads and bridges
5. a grand bargain budget deal to get the nation in fiscal order

In May 2013 Delaney first introduced the initial major component of his competitiveness agenda, the Partnership to Build America Act (H.R. 2084). It would finance up to $750 billion in infrastructure investment at no cost to the taxpayer, instead bonds would be sold to the private sector.

In March 2019, as a presidential candidate, Delaney stated,

Last year in this country, 80 percent of the venture capital went to only 50 counties. So we have allowed an economic model to evolve with an enormous concentration of economic opportunity in a relatively small number of places, and we should have known this was going to happen. We've watched it happen for decades, but political parties have been too busy fighting about it. My campaign is not about moving the goal post to make it even harder to get things done, which is what I fear some of my opponents are actually going to try to do. But my campaign is about actually getting real things done that have broad support among the American people and being the kind of leader that can absolutely drive that kind of change.

Delaney plans, if elected president, to create the position of "Entrepreneurship Czar", a special advisor tasked with overseeing aspects of entrepreneurship.

Delaney has proposed a "Heartland Fair Deal" to help revive rural communities in the United States.

Delaney has floated the idea of establishing a new Small Business Investment Company (SBIC) to help ensure that minority entrepreneurs would have access to capital.

Delaney wants to see the Consumer Financial Protection Bureau restore its focus on anti-discrimination regulations in financial services.

Delaney has proposed creating a federal grant program which would fund startup incubators and accelerators at Historically Black Colleges and Universities.

=== Agriculture ===
Delaney believes that the agricultural policy should be committed to effective food production, responsible farming, and the health and welfare of the public.

Delaney voted in support of the proposed Foxx amendment to the 2018 Farm Bill, which would have modernized and reformed the sugar program by removing barriers to domestic production and implementing market reforms.

Concurring with an overwhelming majority of House members, Delaney voted against the proposed McClintock amendment to the 2018 farm bill, which related to the phasing-out of agricultural subsidies. Also in concurrence with a majority of his House colleagues, Delaney voted against the Biggs amendment, which would have repealed the bioenergy subsidy programs established in title IX of the 2002 farm bill.

=== Banking ===
In 2017, Delaney voted against the Financial CHOICE Act, which would roll-back key Dodd-Frank protections.

As a presidential candidate, Delaney has proposed adopting legislation which would establish nonprofit banks in order to increase distressed communities' access to banking services.

Delaney supports making reforms to the banking industry which would encourage more small business lending.

=== Business regulations ===
Delaney believes that the United States needs to, "eliminate duplicate and pointless regulations that serve as a major stumbling block for businesses".

As a presidential candidate, Delaney has promised that he would ensure, "that government regulations don't stifle entrepreneurship".

=== Federal budget ===
On his congressional web portal, Delaney wrote,

Our federal budget should reflect our national priorities and values. In my view, that means that we're supporting our troops and protecting our country, positioning the next generation to thrive, making sure that our veterans and seniors receive the benefits they deserve.

On budget matters, rather than moving from fiscal crisis to fiscal crisis, Delaney argues that Congress should focus on passing a grand budget deal that reduces the deficit in a balanced way. He argues that congress needs to do its job, which is to come together, negotiate in good faith, and find a solution.

Delaney supports a balanced approach to the budget that fundamentally changes the nation's fiscal trajectory and reduces its debt. He believes that congress should emulate what he considers to have been a balanced and data-driven approach taken by Alan Simpson and Erskine Bowles (co-chairs of the National Commission on Fiscal Responsibility and Reform).

Delaney views recent budgets offered by Paul Ryan and supported by the majority in Congress have been wrong for the country. He believes that Democrats should lead on deficit reduction and entitlement reform and should continue to reach across the aisle and push for a grand bargain budget deal along the lines of Simpson-Bowles.

Delaney believes that smart budgets must include investments in the future, including proper support for education and job training, science and research, alternative energy, and infrastructure. He asserts that the 2013 budget alternative authored by Chris Van Hollen was superior to the budget that was ultimately passed by Congress. He argues that the budget should be oriented towards positioning the country for the next century. Delaney feels that support for federal workers is critical, as the federal government should not be expected to be world-class if it marginalizes its employees each year.

Delaney has voted against the balanced budget amendment.

=== Infrastructure ===
As part of his economic plan, Delaney has proposed infrastructure investment to rebuild roads and bridges In May 2013 he first introduced the Partnership to Build America Act (H.R. 2084; 113th Congress) to congress. It would establish the "American Infrastructure Fund" and finance up to $750 billion in infrastructure investment at no cost to the taxpayer, instead bonds would be sold to the private sector.

In March 2013, Delaney sponsored 2013 TIGER grants legislation, which would invest $1 billion in transportation projects.

Delaney has also sponsored the Infrastructure 2.0 Act (H.R. 1670; 115th Congress), which would use revenue from international tax reform to fund an infrastructure bank and the Highway Trust Fund.

Delaney believes that private investment in infrastructure can be increased by instituting a higher capital gains tax rate for short-term investing, accompanied by very low raters for investors who hold their investments for ten years or more.

As a presidential candidate, Delaney proposed a $2 trillion infrastructure plan. His plan would set up dedicated funding streams to address climate resiliency, water, schools, rural broadband and “areas left behind.” It would additionally establishment infrastructure funds to boost priorities, while putting more funds into the federal highway trust fund. It would be paid for by increasing federal gas taxes and by raising the corporate income tax from 21% to 27%, undoing part of the tax cuts of the Tax Cuts and Jobs Act of 2017.

Delaney proposes establishing an "Infrastructure Bank". Such a proposal is included in his presidential infrastructure plan. He also introduced bipartisan legislation when a congressman to establish one. In his presidential infrastructure plan, Delaney proposes providing such a bank with $50 billion in capital in order to leverage $750 billion in projects across the country. He believes that this would also encourage public-private partnerships.

Delaney's presidential infrastructure plan proposes providing the Highway Trust Fund with a one-time "boost" of $200 billion.

In order to address water infrastructure, Delaney's presidential infrastructure plan proposes supplementing the Water Infrastructure Finance and Innovation Act and existing state revolving funds with the establishment of a new $40 billion Water Infrastructure Matching Fund to enable state and local governments to have funding dedicated to invest in ports, harbors, and water systems. He believes that this would help enable investments that would prevent another incident similar to the Flint water crisis.

Delaney's presidential infrastructure plan also includes the establishment of a $60 billion Climate Infrastructure Fund, $40 billion School Infrastructure Matching Fund, $40 billion Deferred Maintenance Matching Fund, and $40 billion Rural Broadband Matching Fund.

=== Innovation ===
Delaney planned to focus his presidential campaign on innovation. In an interview, he stated,

This is obviously the most important job in the country and probably the most important job in the world. I think I'm uniquely positioned to both change the way government operates and to change the debate. I want to talk about the future and not the past. When I'm with people who are not involved in politics, the debate is entirely focused on how technology, automation and global interconnection are changing the world profoundly, and there's almost no conversation about that in national politics. Literally almost zero. And that, arguably, is the most important thing for us to talk about from an economic perspective. He has a background as a businessman and entrepreneur.

As a presidential candidate, Delaney also stated that, "technology and artificial intelligence are fundamentally reshaping every aspect of our society, our economy, work, our security risks."

Delaney believes that long-term changes spurred by globalization and technology have drastically changed the American economy in the last three decades, and that the United States economy needs to catch up with these innovations. His presidential Economic Opportunity plan proposes making direct investments in communities that have been, "left behind by globalization and technological change".

=== Jobs ===
In March 2013, Delaney voted against providing workforce training by state block grants & industry partnerships.

=== Labor unions ===
Delaney is supportive of trade unions, and touts his own blue-collar background and union roots (he grew up in a union household). The AFL–CIO has given him a 91% lifetime score.

=== National debt ===
On his congressional web portal, Delaney wrote,

Reducing our national debt and putting our finances on a healthy long-term trajectory is vitally important. Left unchecked, growing debt will eventually lead to larger and larger interest payments, which will make it difficult to continue to fund the essential programs that provide great benefit to our country. Deficit reduction is also a major competitiveness issue. Meaningful progress on deficit reduction will strengthen our position on the global market and help our businesses grow.

To reduce the deficit, as a congressman Delaney championed an approach that included additional revenues, Social Security and Medicare reform, and investments in the future. He argued there to be three simple steps Congress could take to reduce the deficit in a fair, balanced, and responsible manner. First, they can create more revenues by closing certain corporate tax loopholes and imposing a "Buffett style" rule on individuals making over $1 million in annual income. Second, by raising the cap on Social Security taxes, and adjusting the retirement age for those not engaged in manual labor, and reforming cost of living adjustments, congress can strengthen Social Security for decades to come in a fiscally responsible way. Delaney believes that such reforms should not affect current beneficiaries, but rather should be phased in gradually over time. Finally, congress can adjust discretionary defense spending up and down as needed in order to reflect national priorities.

For his efforts during the 114th congress, Delaney was recognized by the Campaign to Fix the Debt as a "Fiscal Hero". The Campaign to Fix the Debt awards the title to members of congress for casting fiscally responsible votes, prioritizing the national debt as a top issue and working within their party and on a bipartisan basis to improve the nation's fiscal future.

Delaney voted against the balanced budget amendment.

Delaney believes the United States should balance its taxes and spending to reduce its deficits to a mere 2% over the long term. He believes that, if the United States can manage to have long-term annual deficits less than the level of annual economic growth, that debt as percentage of the nation's economy will decline. He believes that these measures will facilitate at least 2.5% consistent annual growth of the United States economy. He believes the key metric to address is the percentage of the GDP which is debt, and aims to have the United States begin to gradually decrease the ratio to be, "more in line with historical averages".

Delaney believes the United States needs to lower its long-term spending growth.

Delaney believes that the shortfalls of the United States healthcare system contributes to the nation's excess in spending, and believes that healthcare reform can help to decrease United States' spending.

=== Taxes ===
Delaney has voted in support of a number of tax relief bills. He voted in support of America's Small Business Tax Relief Act of 2014 and America's Small Business Tax Relief Act of 2015. He has also voted in support of American Research and Competitiveness Act of 2015 and the S Corporation Permanent Tax Relief Act of 2014.

Delaney voted against the Tax Cuts and Jobs Act of 2017.

Delaney has voted against the repeal of the estate tax.

To address the national debt, Delaney has proposed several tax-related measures. This includes creating more revenues by closing certain corporate tax loopholes and imposing a "Buffett style" rule on individuals making over $1 million in annual income. It also includes raising the cap on Social Security taxes. Delaney champions a form of the "Buffet rule" should be implemented that incorporates aligning capital gains tax rates with ordinary income tax rates. He argues that a lower capital gains tax is unneeded, an outdated incentive that contributes significantly to structural unfairness in the United States tax code by allowing investors to pay lower rates than workers. However, Delaney advocates for instituting a higher capital gains tax rate for short-term investing, accompanied by very low rates for investors who hold their investments for ten years or more. He believes that these measures would both benefit investment in startups and infrastructure.

To also address the national debt, Delaney proposes rolling back tax cuts Republicans have given to high earners and raising the corporate tax rate to approximately 27%.

Delaney has supported expanding tax credits for low-income families. Delaney has touted the effectiveness of the earned income tax credit as a tool for combating poverty. He wants to nearly double the earned income tax credit. Delaney claims that this proposal of his, which he has dubbed the "Workers' Tax Credit", would increase maximum benefits for low-income earners by $1,500 for each eligibility category. He claims that this proposal would see 14 million more households covered than under the existing Earned Income Tax Credit. He proposes paying for this with an increase in the capital gains tax rates on high income earners, by repealing the tax cuts that President Trump passed for high income earners in the Tax Cuts and Jobs Act of 2017, and by creating a new "Robot Tax" on job-displacing capital investments.

As a presidential candidate Delaney has also proposed funding infrastructure expenditures by increasing federal gas taxes and by raising the corporate income tax from 21% to 27%, undoing part of the tax cuts of the Tax Cuts and Jobs Act of 2017.

Delaney has proposed instituting a "very small" payroll tax in order to pay for his proposed paid family leave program.

Delaney has proposed instituting a tax credit that would promote venture capital investments in minority-owned businesses.

A new tax that Delaney has proposed is a two-cent tax on morphine milligram equivalents in prescription pain pills which would be used to fund block grants for states to fund opioid addiction treatment programs.

=== Wages and income ===
==== Basic Income ====
Delaney opposes implementing a basic income (also known as a universal basic income).

==== Minimum wage ====
Delaney supports implementing a $15 minimum wage. He proposes increasing the minimum wage to this amount over time, including for tipped employees, and then indexing it to inflation.

== Foreign policy ==
Delaney has stated his support for a foreign policy that contains, "a strong national defense, support for our military and veterans, unwavering commitment to our values and allies."

In August 2014 he signed the Ebola Relief Resolution which called on the United States and the international community to provide another $500M and 3,000 addition troops to fight the Western African Ebola virus epidemic.

=== NATO ===
To help stabilize Eastern Europe, Delaney has believes that the United States needs to undertake a re-commitment to NATO and their regional allies.

=== Relations ===
==== Chinese relations ====
In July 2014, Delaney signed the Falun Gong Resolution, which condemned China's organ harvesting from Falun Gong practitioners.

Delaney believes that Chinese theft of United States intellectual property is a "significant economic threat" to the United States. He believes that to counter this the United States needs to construct a "global alliance" that would “put pressure on China to open up their markets in a way that's fair.”

==== Iranian relations ====
Delaney has been critical of Trump's decision to withdraw from the Joint Comprehensive Plan of Action. Delaney considers Trump's decision to be squandered opportunity to the United States to work with allies in preventing proliferation. Delaney believes that Trump's decision heightened the risk of Iran obtaining nuclear weapons or initiating a military conflict.

Delaney tweeted, "THIS is why Putin helped Trump campaign—he knew Trump is untrustworthy & would back out of our global engagements (TPP, Paris, Iran) & diminish our leadership in the world. Pulling back from our global leadership position is bad for our economy & nat sec."

In further response to Trump's announcement of his decision to withdraw from the JCPOA, Delaney said, "What makes matters worse, I fear it was done solely for political reason ... I hope that the damage is not permanent and that this mistake does not undermine the hugely important negotiations with North Korea and our national security more broadly."

==== Israeli relations ====
Delaney values the United States' relationship with Israel. Delaney believes in a two-state solution.

In May 2019, Delaney declared, "I am completely committed to the security of Israel and recognize them as one of the most important and enduring allies to the United States."

In June 2019, Delaney stated, "Israel is clearly our strongest and most enduring ally in the region, and one of our strongest and most enduring allies, period. I have been an outspoken proponent of a two-state solution, which I have always supported and will continue to support."

In 2019, Delaney condemned Israeli Prime Minister Benjamin Netanyahu's decision to block United States congresswomen Rashida Talib and Ilhan Omar from visiting the country.

==== Russian relations ====
Delaney considered the Russian military intervention in the Republic of Ukraine to be an affront to what he viewed as the United States' national values of democracy, sovereignty, and the rule of law. He also considered it to be a threat to civilian lives.

In 2014, Delaney voiced his support to implement sanctions against Russia in response to their regional actions, as well as new initiatives to sell American natural gas to Europe as a way of stopping Russia's regional influence.

On April 30, 2019, Delaney said that "responsible president is cleareyed about Russia's motives and tactics but is mindful that dialogue with Russia is in our self-interest."

==== Saudi Arabia ====
Delaney opposes the Saudi Arabian–led intervention in Yemen.

==== Syrian relations ====
Delaney has supported American-led intervention in the Syrian Civil War, calling for the United States to develop at "Syria strategy" that would support the Kurds, as well as "our role in rebuilding, countering Iran's ambitions, approach to Assad & governance, refugees & Russia".

==== Venezuelan relations ====
In January 2019, following Juan Guaidó's self-declaration as interim President of Venezuela, Delaney told HuffPost that he supported recognising Guaidó and imposing sanctions on the country but opposed military intervention, "absent protecting American citizens". Delaney, however, opposes military intervention in Venezuela.

=== Trade ===
In February 2015, Delaney voted to approve $25B more loans from Export–Import Bank.

In September 2017, he said, "In the last election, we kind of created the wrong villain. The villain, they said, was globalization, but in reality it was government's failure to respond to changes that were ultimately positive for the economy, but they weren't positive for everyone and we watched it happen and we did nothing about it."

In May 2019, Delaney declared, "My vision embraces free trade and leverages trade agreements to support US jobs, both through US exports and to compete in the global economy."

In June 2019, Delaney declared, "I don't think it was a bad decision to enter into free trade agreements, but I do believe it was a terrible decision not to invest in our country while we were doing that. It should've been obvious to the people making free trade decisions in the 1990s and early 2000s that parts of our country would face severe problems. It was irresponsible not to pair trade agreements with robust domestic economic programs."

Delaney has criticized the Trump tariffs, particularly the negative impacts they are expected to have on American farmers.

Delaney has proposed re-entering the Trans Pacific Partnership, which Trump withdrew the United States from.

Delaney believes that the World Trade Organization (WTO) must be "more assertive" and that the United States must "exercise more influence" through the WTO.

== Military and defense policy ==
In 2015, Delaney voted against legislation which would decrease the minimum number of aircraft carriers which the military is required to maintain.

=== Guantanamo Bay detention camp ===
Delaney has voted in support of legislation that would remove restrictions inhibiting the closure of Guantanamo Bay detention camp. He has also voted against legislation that would place additional obstacles to prevent its closure.

=== Drone strikes ===
Delaney supports the use of drone strikes.

=== National security ===
Delaney believes that threats to national security come in a variety of forms. He believes that the threat of terrorism requires continued vigilance. In addition to traditional measures of defense, he believes that the United States must develop its cyber security and biodefense. Delaney points to work done in Maryland at facilities such as Fort Detrick as being absolutely essential to the nation's defense.

Delaney voted against the Cyber Intelligence Sharing and Protection Act.

In January 2018, Delaney voted against legislation which would limit the ability of officials to search and read private messages collected incidentally as part of the Foreign Intelligence Surveillance. He also voted to reauthorize warrantless spying program as part of the Foreign Intelligence Surveillance Act.

In March 2018, Delaney voted in support of legislation to provide funding for measures to prevent school violence, including training for officials and threat detection

Delaney believes that investments in effective border security (including high tech solutions, fencing, increased security personnel, and improvements at port of entry) would improve the United States' national security.

During his presidential campaign, Delaney has proposed establishing a federal "Department of Cybersecurity".

=== Nuclear arms reduction ===
In 2015, Delaney voted in support of legislation that would protect funding for the disarming of nuclear weapons. He also voted against legislation that would have limited funding for the START treaty.

== Other issues ==
=== Government ===
Delaney places great emphasis on his strong belief in bipartisanship. He considers hyper-partisanship to be of great harm to the United States. Delaney has stated that he believes that, "legislation brought forth in a bipartisan way, with sponsors from both sides, has a better chance of succeeding in the short term and enduring in the long term." Delaney has previously been ranked by GovTrack as one of the most bipartisan members of congress.

Delaney has advocated for a more honest government, stating, "If we want to restore trust with the American, we need to communicate directly and honestly with them."

Delaney has expressed great appreciation for concept of America's branches of government acting as a system of checks and balances, saying,

Our Founding Fathers didn't invent democracy, but they did create a better version of it—one that two hundred fifty years later, endures and remains the envy of the world. Our three equal branches of government, and the checks and balances they provide, have granted us unprecedented stability, security, and economic prosperity, and the Founders' intentional decentralization of power has kept us safe from autocracy. And while our system is not perfect, it does work.

Delaney has proposed taking a different approach to the presidency, if elected. He has pledged to only sign bipartisan legislation in his first hundred days. He also has pledged to introduce a tradition of regularly engaging in debates on the floor of the congress, similarly to the Prime Minister of the United Kingdom.

Delaney has proclaimed himself to be a strong supporter of government transparency.

== See also ==
- Political positions of the 2020 Democratic Party presidential primary candidates
