= Lakhdar Rakhroukh =

Algerian politician

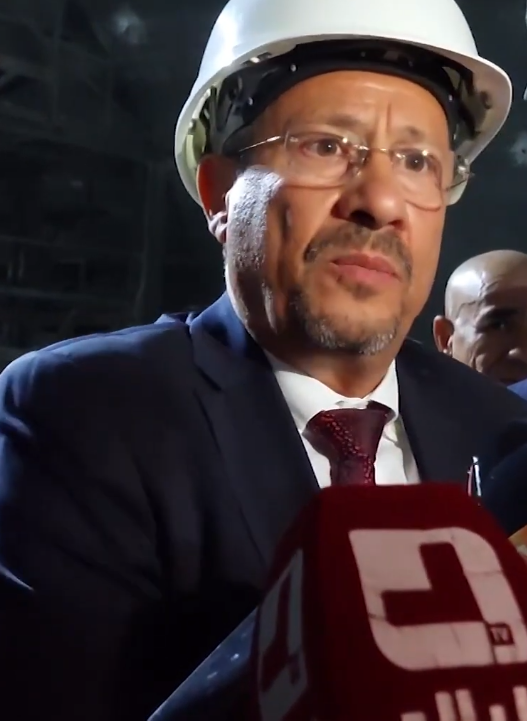
- Rekhroukh in 2023

Minister of Public Works, Hydraulics and Basic Infrastructure
- Incumbent
- Assumed office 9 September 2022
- President: Abdelmadjid Tebboune
- Prime Minister: Aymen Benabderrahmane; Nadir Larbaoui

Personal details
- Born: November 13, 1958 (age 67) Algiers, Algeria
- Education: National Polytechnic School (D)

Lakhdar Rakhroukh (born 13 November 1958 in Algiers) is the Algerian Minister of Public Works, Hydraulics and Basic Infrastructure. He was appointed on 9 September 2022.

== Education ==
Rakhroukh holds a Diploma in Civil Engineering (1984) from the National Polytechnic School.
