= Buffett Rule =

2011 tax plan by President Obama

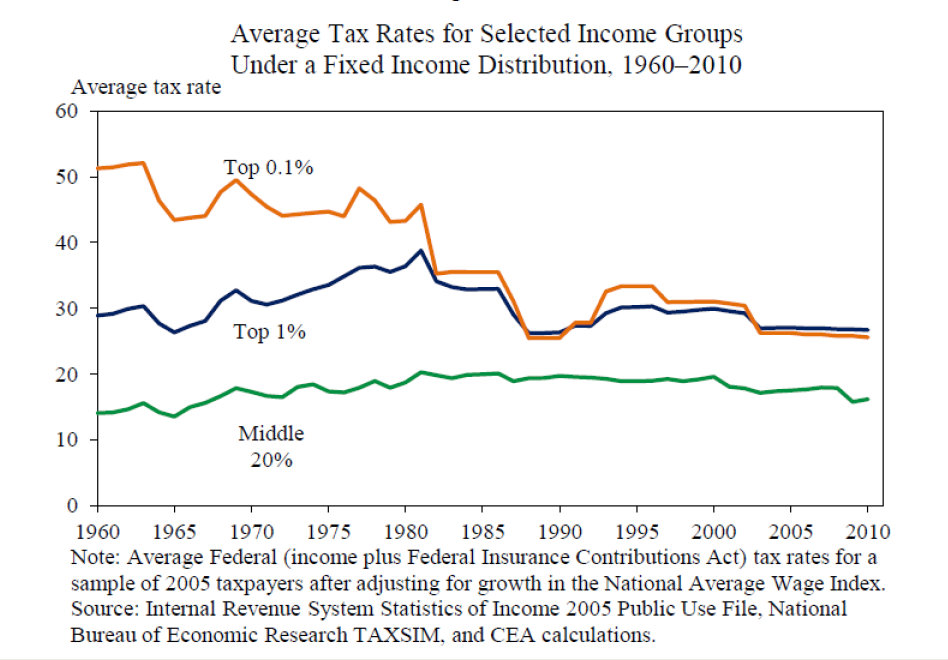
Average tax rates for selected income groups under a fixed income distribution, 1960–2010

The Buffett Rule is part of a tax plan which would require millionaires and billionaires to pay the same tax rate as middle-class families and working people. It was proposed by President Barack Obama in 2011. The tax plan proposed would apply a minimum tax rate of 30 percent on individuals making more than one million dollars a year. According to a White House official, the new tax rate would directly affect 0.3 percent of taxpayers.

== History ==
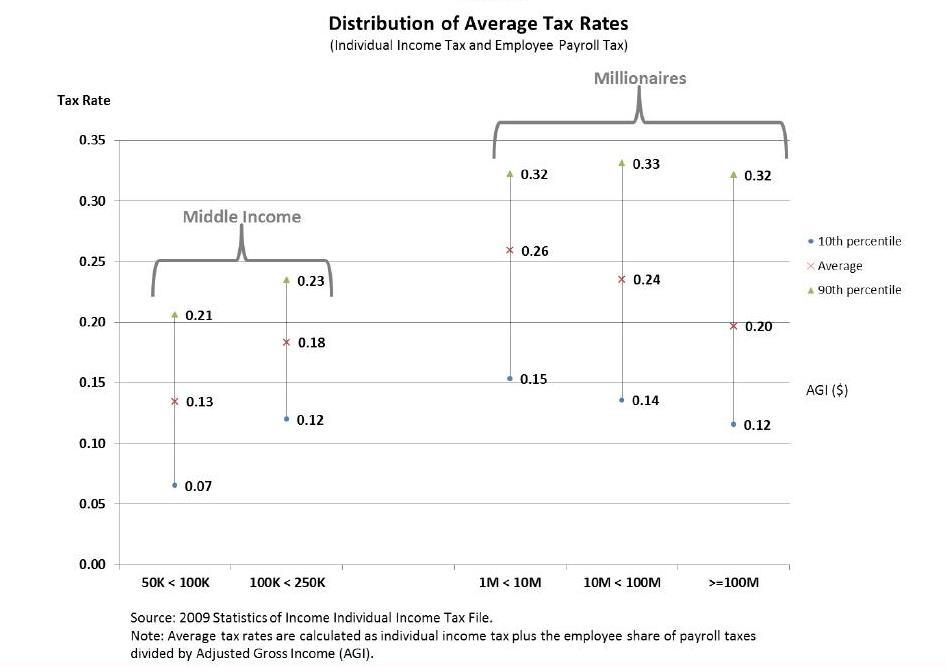
Distribution of average tax rates including individual income tax and employee payroll tax

The Buffett Rule is named after American investor Warren Buffett, who publicly stated in early 2011 that he believed it was wrong that rich people, like himself, could pay less in federal taxes, as a portion of income, than the middle class, and voiced support for increased income taxes on the wealthy. The rule would implement a higher minimum tax rate for taxpayers in the highest income bracket, to ensure that they do not pay a lower percentage of income in taxes than less-affluent Americans. In October 2011, Senate leader Harry Reid (D–Nev.) proposed a 5.6 percent surtax on everyone making over a million dollars a year to pay for new stimulus provisions, but the change did not go through.

A White House statement released in January 2012 defined the rule as part of "measures to ensure everyone making over a million dollars a year pays a minimum effective tax rate of at least 30 percent ... implemented in a way that is equitable, including not disadvantaging individuals who make large charitable contributions." The White House also stated that "no household making more than $1 million each year should pay a smaller share of their income in taxes than a middle-class family pays."

The Buffett Rule was not in the President's 2012 budget proposal and the White House initially stressed it as a guideline rather than a legislative initiative. The rule, however, was later submitted for deliberation as US Senate Bill S. 2059, Paying a Fair Share Act of 2012. On April 16, 2012, the bill received 51 affirmative votes, but was stopped by a Republican filibuster that required 60 votes to proceed to debate and a vote on final passage.

== Possible effects ==
If enacted, the rule change would result in $36.7 billion per year in additional tax revenue ($367 billion over the next decade), according to a January 2012 analysis by the Tax Foundation, a think tank. These figures assume that the 2001/2003/2010 tax cuts are not extended. If the 2001-2010 tax cuts do not expire as scheduled, estimated Buffett Rule revenues would total $162 billion over the decade. An alternative study released that same month by the Citizens for Tax Justice, a liberal think tank which favors the change, stated that the change would add $50 billion per year in tax revenue ($500 billion over the decade). The United States Congress Joint Committee on Taxation released a letter in March 2012 estimating that the Buffett Rule would raise $46.7 billion over the next decade. The divergent estimates come about because of different assumptions about the details of the Buffett Rule. For example, the Joint Committee on Taxation assumes that many high-income taxpayers would reduce the amount of capital gains realized in one year to fall beneath the Buffett Rule threshold.

The estimated $47 billion would offset by 0.7% the $6.4 trillion increase in spending over the next decade estimated by the Congressional Budget Office, based on President Obama's 2013 budget plan. Using the higher estimate from the Tax Foundation, the estimated $367 billion would offset by 5.7% the $6.4 trillion spending over the next decade.

The 2013 budget proposed by the Obama administration stated that the Buffett Rule should replace the Alternative Minimum Tax. The Joint Committee on Taxation calculated that the Buffett Rule plus the repeal of the Alternative Minimum Tax would increase the deficit by $793.3 billion in the next decade. The $793.3 billion loss projected did not take into account additional proposed measures, such as incremental increases in retirement age and payroll tax lifetime contributions raised to $190,000 by 2020, about $22,000 higher than it would be under current law.

Part of the reason for the inequality in taxation is that revenue from long-term capital gains is taxed at a maximum rate of 23.8%. It's not entirely clear how many individuals would be affected by the change. An October 2011 study by the Congressional Research Service found that a 30% minimum tax rate rule would mean up to 200,000 taxpayers, equivalent to 0.06% of all U.S. citizens, paying more.

== Reactions and public opinion ==
=== Support ===
Paul Krugman, The New York Times columnist and Nobel Prize–winning economist, wrote in January 2012 that "such low taxes on the very rich are indefensible". He stated that "the economic record certainly doesn’t support the notion that superlow taxes on the superrich are the key to prosperity" asserting that since the U.S. economy added 11.5 million jobs during President Bill Clinton's first term, when the capital gains tax rate was over 29 percent, he thinks there's no real reason to keep from raising the tax rate.

A CBS News/The New York Times poll released in January 2012 found that 52 percent of Americans agreed that investments should be taxed at the same rate as income. A Gallup poll released in April 2012 also found that 60 percent of Americans support the rule. A similar poll released later that month by CNN found that 72 percent of Americans support the idea.

=== Opposition ===
Representative Paul Ryan (R–Wis.), who was the chairman of the House Budget Committee, criticized the new tax provisions. He labeled it as class warfare and also stated that it would negatively impact job creation and investment. Senate Minority Leader Mitch McConnell (R–Ky.) said the conditions of the U.S. economy were ill-disposed to raising taxes. House Speaker John Boehner (R–Ohio) has spoken against the proposed rule and said that, "there's a reason we have low rates on capital gains ... because it spurs new investment in our economy and allows capital to move more quickly." Dana Milbank from The Washington Post criticized the proposed tax as a gimmick, stating that President Obama was prioritizing the Buffett Rule over the alternative minimum tax for political, not economic reasons.

== See also ==
- Economic policy of the Obama Administration
- Occupy movement
- Taxation in the United States
- United States federal budget
- We are the 99%
