= Boualem Sansal =

French-Algerian author (born 1944)

Boualem Sansal ⴱⵓⴰⵍⴰⵎ ⵙⴻⵏⵚⴰⵍ
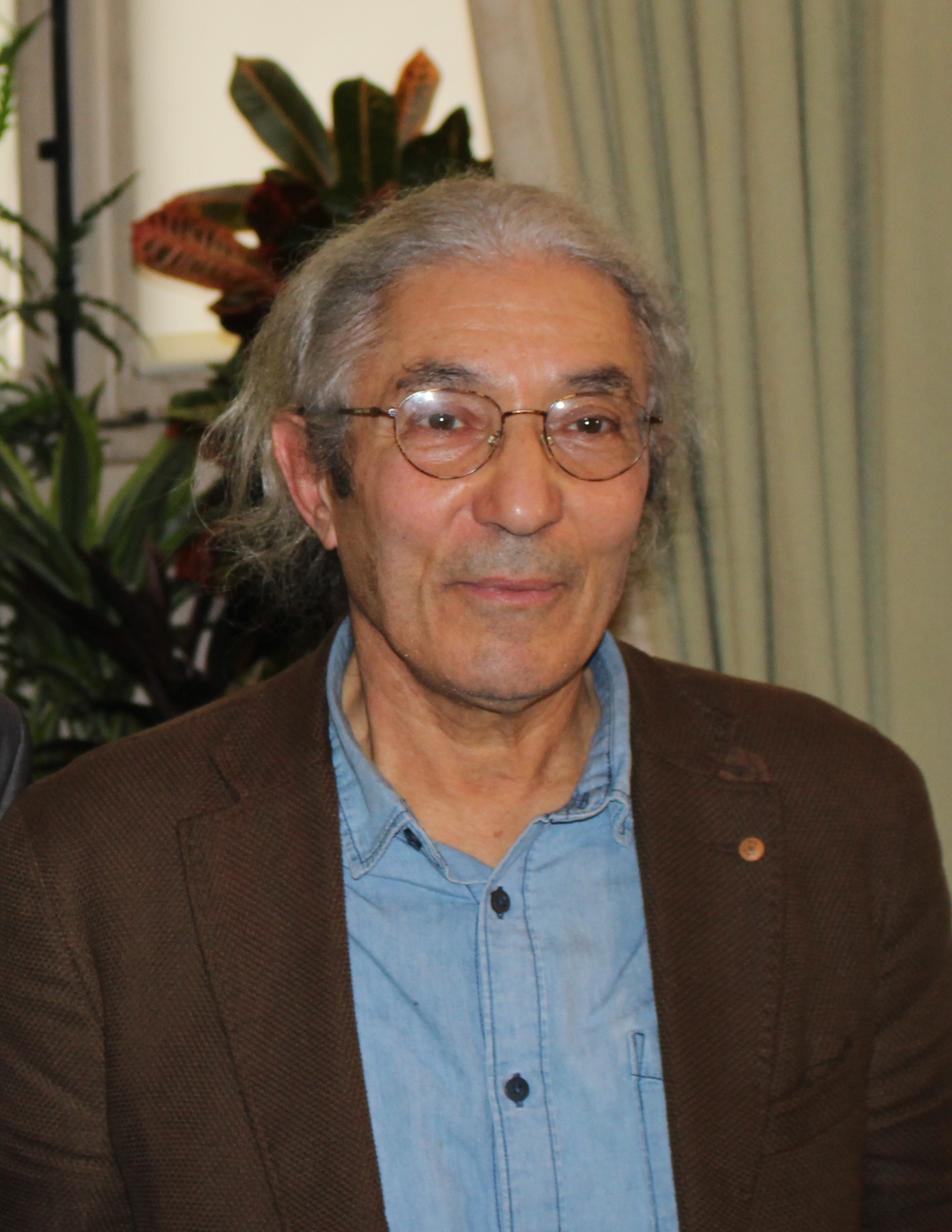
- Born: Boualem Sansal; 15 October 1944 (age 82); Theniet El Had, Tissemsilt, French Algeria
- Occupations: Novelist, essayist
- Writing career
- Language: French
- Period: 1990s–present
- Notable works: The Barbarians' Oath (1999); An Unfinished Business (2008); 2084: The End of the World (2015)

Boualem Sansal (Arabic: بوعلام صنصال; Tamazight: Buɛlam Senṣal; Tifinagh: ⴱⵓⴰⵍⴰⵎ ⵙⴻⵏⵚⴰⵍ; French pronunciation: [bwalɛm sɑ̃sal]; born 15 October 1944) is a French-Algerian author who writes in French. He holds an engineering degree from the National Polytechnic School and a PhD in economics. Sansal has worked as a teacher, consultant, business leader, and senior official in Algeria’s Ministry of Industry. After retiring from his high-ranking government position, he began writing novels at the age of 50. He is known for his outspoken criticism of Islamism.

Sansal has authored several novels that have earned him literary awards mainly French, including the Prix du Premier Roman (1999), the Prix Nessim-Habif (2008), the Peace Prize of the German Book Trade (2011), the Grand Prix du roman de l'Académie française (2015), and the Prix mondial Cino Del Duca (2025).

He was imprisoned in Algeria on 16 November 2024, shortly after criticising the country’s dictatorial regime. His arrest has escalated the diplomatic tensions between Algeria and France. On 27 March 2025, he was sentenced to five years in prison. He was pardoned on 12 November 2025 and was transferred to Germany for medical treatment.

Sansal was elected to the Académie Française on 29 January 2026.

== Biography ==
Boualem Sansal was born on 15 October 1944, in Theniet El Had (during the French colonial period), a village in the Ouarsenis Mountains, in Algeria. His father, Abdelkader Sansal, is of Moroccan origin and comes from a family in the Rif region of Morocco that settled in Algeria. His mother, Khadidja Benallouche, received a French-style education. Boualem Sansal spent part of his childhood in the Belcourt neighborhood of Algiers.

Boualem Sansal has an engineering degree from the National Polytechnic School as well as a PhD in economics. He has worked as a teacher, consultant, business leader, and senior official at the Algerian Ministry of Industry.

He began writing novels at the age of 50 after retiring from his job as a high-ranking official in the Algerian government. The assassination of President Mohamed Boudiaf in 1992 and the rise of Islamic fundamentalism in Algeria inspired him to write about his country.

Sansal continues to live with his wife and two daughters in Algeria despite the controversy his books have aroused in his homeland. At the 2007 International Festival of Literature in Berlin, he was introduced as a writer "exiled in his own country". He claims that Algeria is becoming a bastion of Islamic extremism and the country is losing its intellectual and moral underpinnings.

Sansal took French citizenship in 2024.

=== 2024 arrest ===
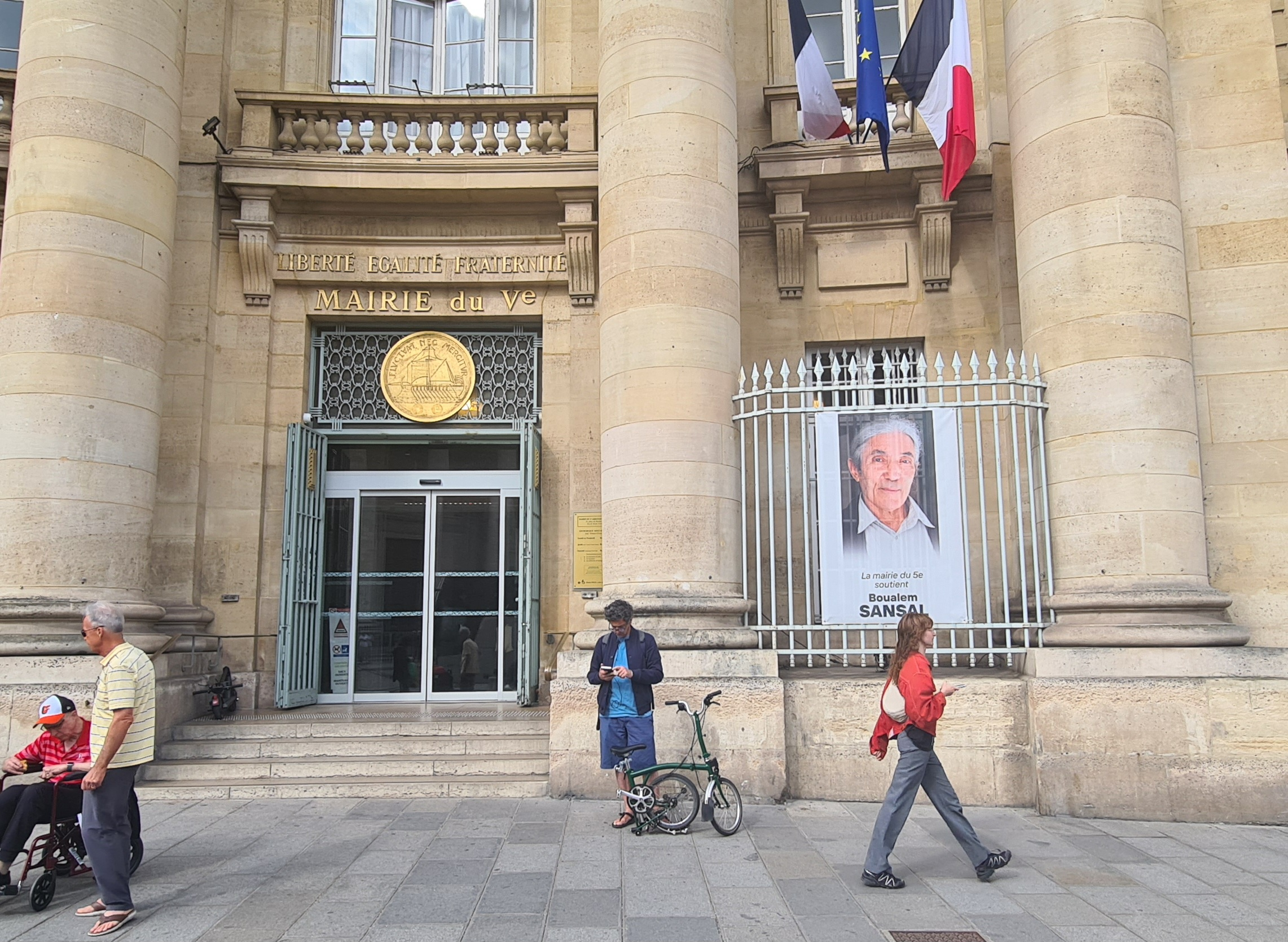
Support for Boualem Sansal in Paris (June 2025)

In November 2024, Boualem Sansal was taken into custody in Algiers by the police on charges of "undermining national unity"; criminal proceedings were also brought against him. Sansal's arrest occurred in a context when Algeria's relations with France were at an all time low. Sansal was charged with undermining Algeria's territorial integrity and economy, insulting authorities and possessing documents that endangered national interests. He was accused of undermining the integrity of Algerian territory, for having taken up, on Frontières, a French far-right media outlet, Morocco's position according to which its territory had been amputated for the benefit of Algeria under French colonization.

Shortly after Sansal's arrest, when his whereabouts were still uncertain, French President Emmanuel Macron expressed concern about his situation: Algeria Press Service, the Algerian government's news agency, responded with a scathing release that confirmed Sansal's arrest, called him a "denier" of his country's history and sovereignty, and accused the French government of being under the influence of an "anti-Algerian", "Zionist" lobby. Literary figures, including four Nobel Prize winners, demanded Sansal's release. French foreign minister Jean-Noël Barrot also expressed concern over Sansal's fate and questioned Algeria's intentions regarding its relations with France. In February, Algerian President Abdelmadjid Tebboune mentioned that "Boualem Sansal is not an Algerian problem. It's a problem for those who created it [...] It's a sordid affair aimed at mobilizing against Algeria."

In December 2024, Sansal, suffering from prostate cancer, was transferred to a care unit. On January 23, 2025, the European Parliament passed a resolution calling for his immediate release. Algerian lawmakers signed a statement rebuking the European Parliament's resolution, which they said contained "misleading allegations with the sole aim of launching a blatant attack against Algeria." The Arab Parliament also condemned the European Parliament's resolution, calling it "irresponsible" and a "blatant and unacceptable interference" in Algeria's domestic affairs, and calling on the European Parliament to "respect the decisions of the Algerian judicial system."

In February 2025, Sansal's French lawyer, François Zimeray, claimed that Sansal was going on a hunger strike. President of the Algiers Bar, Mohamed Baghdadi, however, contradicted this claim, asserting that Sansal is "not on a hunger strike." Baghdadi also expressed surprise that Zimeray "continues to say that he is still his lawyer" after Sansal said that he wanted to defend himself. In March 2025, Zimeray announced that he was going to the UN to denounce Boualem Sansal's "arbitrary detention."

Sansal's imprisonment also caused controversy in France, where several left-wing figures and organizations appeared reluctant to support him. Historian Benjamin Stora commented that Sansal's statements had "hurt Algerian national feelings" and political scientist Nedjib Sidi Moussa claimed that Sansal was hostile to Muslims and immigrants, likening his positions to those of the French far right. La France Insoumise did not support the European Parliament's resolution, with 4 of its MEPs voting against it and 2 abstaining: one of them, Rima Hassan, said she had voted against the resolution because Sansal's case was used by "the right and the far right". On March 4, the French National Assembly passed a resolution calling for Sansal's release, with all left-wing MPs abstaining.

On March 20, the Dar El Beïda court requested ten years in prison for Sansal. Zimeray was not allowed to attend the audience. Echorouk El Yawmi reported that Sansal had said he would dispense with a lawyer, including the one appointed by the court, and represent himself in court. He denied having been in contact with Kabyle independentists as the court surmised. Sansal was also charged on March 13 of "intelligence with foreign entities" by giving sensitive information to the French ambassador in Algeria, though that charge was dropped one week later. The court eventually removed the criminal charges concerning Algeria's territorial integrity. Macron called upon Tebboune, hoping for a "a quick outcome" so that Sansal could "regain his freedom".

On March 27, 2025, Sansal was sentenced to five years in prison and to a fine of 500,000 dinars (about 3,730 US dollars).

In April 2025, his daughters, Nawal and Sabeha, who reside in Prague with their Czech mother, officially requested a presidential pardon from Algerian President Abdelmadjid Tebboune. Facilitated by Czech Ambassador Jan Czerný, the plea was submitted through the Czech Ministry of Foreign Affairs, but no response was received.

In May 2025, the French National Assembly adopted a resolution calling for the "immediate and unconditional release" of Boualem Sansal, detained in Algeria.

On 1 July 2025, an appeals court in Algeria confirmed the five-year prison sentence against Boualem Sansal.

On November 11, 2025, President Tebboune pardoned Sansal following a request from German President Frank-Walter Steinmeier. He was then released and taken to a hospital in Germany the next day.

== Choices, topics, impact ==
Sansal writes in French.

=== Poste restante: Alger (2006 essay) ===
Since the publication of Poste restante: Alger. Lettre de colère et d'espoir à mes compatriotes in 2006, Sansal's books have been banned in Algeria.

=== Le village de l'Allemand (2008 novel) ===
Sansal's 2008 novel Le village de l'Allemand ou le journal des frères Schiller, is the story of two Algerian brothers who burrow into the past and discover that their father had been a Nazi officer who fled to Algeria after the war. The book explores the fine line between Islamic fundamentalism and Nazism. Le Village de l'allemand is the first of Sansal's novels to be translated into English, and was published in the US in September 2009 as The German Mujahid and in the UK as An Unfinished Business.

The novel follows the unique journey that brothers Malrich and Rachel Schiller individually took in discovering the dark past of their late father, a former SS officer, who was responsible for the deaths of countless Jews during the Holocaust. Although the story is fictional, Sansal incorporates many historical events to create a very realistic backdrop. The most significant events Sansal addresses include the end of World War II, the Holocaust, the Algerian War of Independence, and the rise of Islamic Fundamentalism within France. The novel is found to be very controversial because the destructive power of Nazi Germany during World War II is compared to that of Islamic Fundamentalists in Europe after the war. The narrative suggests various themes including the impact of both guilt and violence, the glorification of oppressors, and how the burden of one person's sins can be felt by others. It addresses how knowledge regarding the significance of the Holocaust is understood and misunderstood in vastly different ways around the world. Furthermore, Boualem Sansal highlights the fact that there is very little known about National Socialism in the Arab world. National Socialism was the political ideology of the Nazi Party. The novel suggests that generations which follow World War II and, more specifically, the Holocaust, have a responsibility to educate themselves on the matter using whatever resources are available to them. People also must spread that knowledge to those who cannot access it themselves in order to ensure that such a terrible genocide never occurs again. The benefit to history is that we, as human beings, can learn from the mistakes of the past in order to make better decisions in the future. Sansal's story proves that individuals can have incredible impacts on improving the lives of others and protecting their communities. It does not take an army to enact change or rather, it should not take an army to enact positive change.

== Awards and critical acclaim ==
Sansal's work has won top literary awards in France, among them the Prix du Premier Roman in 1999 for his debut novel, Le serment des Barbares (Gallimard, 1999), which has since been made into a film based on a screenplay by Jorge Semprún.

In 2008, Sansal received the Prix Nessim Habif from Académie royale de langue et de littérature françaises de Belgique.

On 16 October 2011 Sansal received the Peace Prize of the German Book Trade. On 19 December 2011, he was announced as being on the jury for the 62nd Berlin International Film Festival, scheduled to be held in February 2012.

Sansal was the recipient of the 2012 Editions Gallimard Arabic Novel prize for his book "Rue Darwin." The prize is awarded by the Arab Ambassadors Council, based in Paris. However, after the Council learned that Sansal had attended the Jerusalem Writers Festival earlier in the year, they revoked the 15,000 euros prize money he had been slated to receive. Commenting on the decision to withdraw the prize money, Sansal said it was "completely unacceptable", adding that Arab countries – and his home country, Algeria, in particular – had "shut themselves in a prison of intolerance". France Culture radio director and head of the jury that awarded the prize, Olivier Poivre d'Avror, said before resigning his post in protest, that the prize money had been withdrawn as a "sordid" consequence of Hamas pressure. "Between being nominated for the prize and actually receiving it, Boualem Sansal visited Israel … Hamas immediately issued a statement calling his presence an act of treason against the Palestinians. The reaction of Arab Ambassadors Council was a direct result of this." A spokeswoman for the Arab Ambassadors Council claimed the council's decision had not been influenced by the Hamas statement on the matter. Israeli Foreign Minister Avigdor Lieberman urged the international community to denounce the boycott against Sansal.

Sansal said he does not regret visiting Israel, stating, "I am glad I visited Israel and returned with great happiness". Sansal also said "Israelis have all the reasons in the world to be proud of what they have achieved in their country in such a short period of time...In so many fields, Israel is at the international forefront and it is very impressive." Sansal also said that he was moved by Lieberman's support, and, "His statement was so gracious in comparison to Arab governments. He told them: 'You're persecuting intellectuals. We embrace them and care for their safety. That is why your citizens are rebelling against you.' That is a harsh blow to Arab governments." Sansal criticized Hamas as well, saying that it was a terrorist movement that "has taken Gazans hostage. It has taken Islam hostage."

Sansal was awarded the 2015 Grand Prix du roman de l'Académie française for his novel 2084: la fin du monde.

== Honours ==
- Knight of the Legion of Honour (France, 2025)
- Knight of the Ordre des Arts et des Lettres (France, 2012)

== Published work ==
=== Novels ===
- 1999: Le Serment des barbares, Gallimard. Prix du Premier Roman 1999. Prix Tropiques, AFD, 1999
- 2000: L'Enfant fou de l'arbre creux, Gallimard. Prix Michel Dard
- 2003: Dis-moi le paradis, Gallimard
- 2005: Harraga, Gallimard.
  - English translation: *Harraga* (translated by Frank Wynne), Bloomsbury, 2014.
- 2008: Le village de l'Allemand ou le journal des frères Schiller, Gallimard.
  - Translated by Frank Wynne and published in the US as The German Mujahid (2009) and in the UK as An Unfinished Business
  - Grand prix RTL-Lire 2008
  - Grand prix de la francophonie bestowed by the Académie française
  - 2008 Prix Nessim Habif (Académie royale de langue et de littérature françaises de Belgique).
- 2011: Rue Darwin, Gallimard
- 2015: 2084: La fin du monde, Gallimard. Grand Prix du roman de l'Académie française
  - English translation: *2084: The End of the World* (translated by Alison Anderson), Europa editions, 2017.
- 2018: Le Train d'Erlingen ou la Métamorphose de Dieu, Gallimard
- 2021: Lettre d’amitié, de respect et de mise en garde aux peuples et aux nations de la terre, Gallimard

=== Short stories ===
- 2001: "La voix", Gallimard-Le Monde
- 2005: "La vérité est dans nos amours perdues", in Des nouvelles d'Algérie, ed. Métailié
- 2004: "La Femme sans nom", Littera et l'Aube.
- 2005: "Homme simple cherche évènement heureux", Le Monde.
- 2005: "Tous les bonheurs ne valent pas le déplacement", Magazine des Beaux Arts.
- 2006: "La Terrible nouvelle", Le Monde.

=== Essays ===
- 2006: "Poste restante: Alger, lettre de colère et d'espoir à mes compatriotes", Gallimard
- 2007: "Petit éloge de la mémoire", Gallimard
- 2026: "La Légende: Libres méditations d'un prisonnier encombrant", Grasset

=== Technical literature ===
- 1986: La Combustion dans les turboréacteurs, OPU, Alger.
- 1989: La Mesure de la productivité, OPU, Alger
