= 2084: The End of the World =

2015 novel by Boualem Sansal

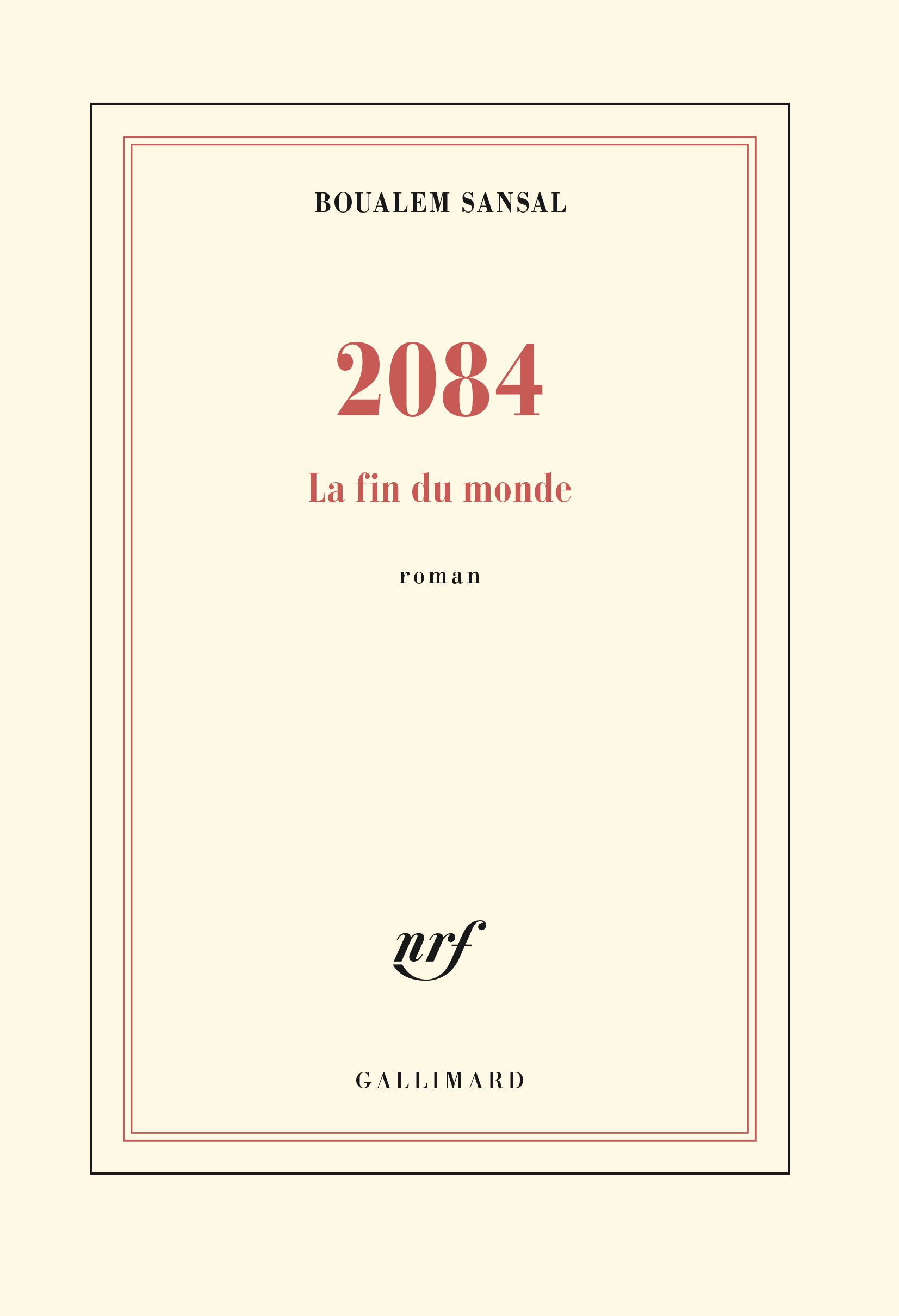
- Collection Blanche cover (first edition)
- Author: Boualem Sansal
- Original title: 2084. La fin du monde
- Translator: Alison Anderson
- Language: French
- Genre: Dystopian; political fiction; social science fiction
- Publisher: Éditions Gallimard
- Publication date: 20 August 2015
- English publication date: 31 January 2017
- Media type: Print (paperback)
- Pages: 288
- ISBN: 978-2-07-014993-3
- OCLC: 921253233
- Dewey Decimal: 843.92
- LC Class: PQ3989.2.S2455 A15 2015

2084: The End of the World (French: 2084. La fin du monde) is a 2015 novel by Algerian writer Boualem Sansal, published by Éditions Gallimard on 20 August 2015. A dystopian novel, 2084 was inspired by George Orwell's Nineteen-Eighty Four and is set in an Islamist totalitarian world in the aftermath of a nuclear holocaust. It was jointly awarded, with Les Prépondérants by Hédi Kaddour, the 2015 Grand Prix du roman de l'Académie française. It was also named the best book of the year by the literary magazine Lire.

The novel was translated into English by Alison Anderson and published by Europa Editions on 31 January 2017 (ISBN 9781609453664).

== Summary ==
Abistan, a vast empire, takes its name from the prophet Abi, Yölah's sole "delegate" on earth. His system is based on a collective amnesia and submission to the one God. Individual thought and remembering the past are banned. An omnipresent surveillance system informs on those who commit deviant thoughts and acts. Officially, the like-minded citizens live happy lives in their unquestioning faith. Religion controls individuals in their most private lives. Thought is reduced by the establishment of a single language, abilang, limiting the length of words. However, despite everything, protagonist Ati feels within himself the call of freedom and seeks to understand if there is something else on earth.

The action takes place in this empire of Abistan, which proclaims to be the entire earth and the start of history, in 2084, because nothing could exist before. The only known event in history is the Great Holy War of 2084 against the Great Disbelief, in which hundreds of millions of martyrs died. Ati questions the imposed certainties. Ati, confronted with this history, will undertake, with his friend Koa, a journey through the districts of Abistan, to free himself from submission to ignorance and to discover the origin of the Gkabul (the Holy Book). He discovers an underground of heretics who live hidden in the fringes of Abistan, in ghettos, without the recourse of religion.

The plot is centered around the discovery of an ancient village by an archaeologist, Nas, that calls into question the very existence of the religious dictatorship.

== Characters ==
- Abi – Yölah's "delegate" on earth; namesake of Abistan
- Ati – the novel's protagonist, who begins to question the legitimacy of the world constructed by the prophet Abi and seeks to uncover truth
- Koa – friend and companion of Ati in his search for truth
- Nas – archaeologist who makes an important discovery which threatens the legitimacy of the official version of history
- Toz – mysterious collector of ancient artifacts who helps Ati
- Yölah – God

== Reception ==
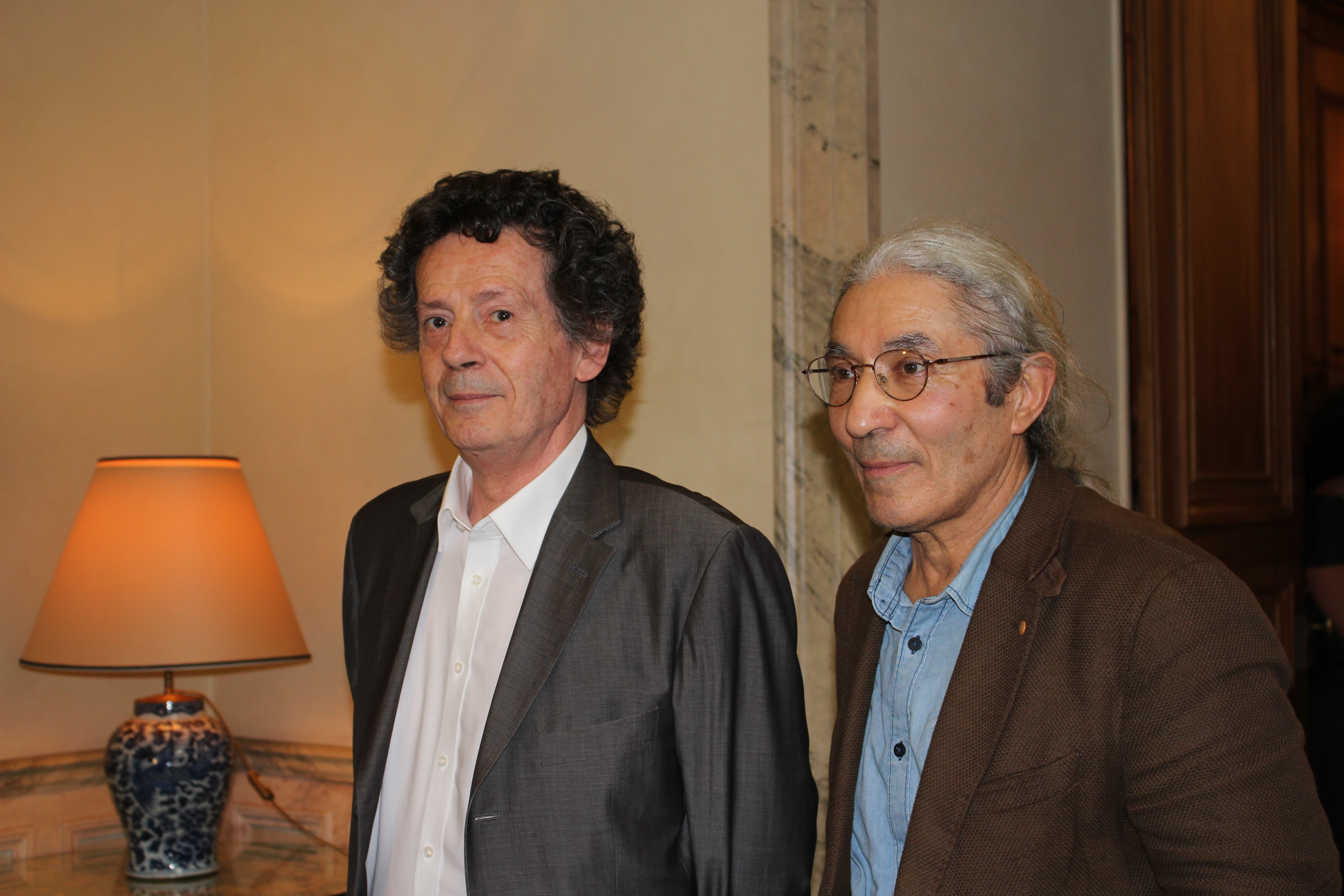
Hédi Kaddour (left) and Boualem Sansal (right) at the Académie Française for the reception of the Grand Prix du Roman.

Marianne Payot of L'Express wrote, "A fable, parable, and pamphlet, 2084 is a profound and frightening novel about a dictatorship without history which will stun readers." Jean-Louis Le Touzet of Libération wrote, "Readers will be swept away by Sansal's rhythm and sink straight into the nightmare which 2084 makes us live." Michel Abescat of Télérama wrote that "the fable is powerful, the humor, devastating, the subject, chilling. 2084 is an extraordinary book, a warning sent by the author to those who, according to him, underestimate the danger of Islamism.

David Caviglioli of BibliObs wrote, "As a fable, 2084 suffers from a didacticism which renders the narrative abstract, and makes readers less interested in the fate of the characters. The text, on the other hand, is carried by a joy of sacrilege."

Gilles Martin-Chauffier of Paris Match wrote, "In twenty years, when the Islamophobic currents of France have declined, we will ask ourselves how we got carried away by such a slow thriller."
