= List of Jungle Jam and Friends: The Radio Show! episodes =

This is a list of episodes in the radio drama Jungle Jam and Friends: The Radio Show!.

== Description ==
Between 1993 and 1995, three audio cassette tape sets containing episodes of Jungle Jam and Friends were released by Everland Entertainment, a division of Word Entertainment. The sets were: Wild Times in God's Creation (1993), More Wild Times in God's Creation (1994), and Even Wilder Times in God's Creation (1995). They all contained episodes as they aired on the radio. This was evident because of the contact information read aloud by voice actor, co-creator, and writer Nathan Carlson, including that of World Vision International, a religious and charitable organization involved in sponsoring Jungle Jam and Friends. In addition, Even Wilder Times was a collection of musical albums previously released by Word Entertainment and edited for broadcast in two parts on the radio.

Starting in 2000, when Woolly Mammoth Entertainment, the studio that produced Jungle Jam and Friends, was renamed Fancy Monkey Studios and acquired ownership of the show, it re-released all the original albums in compact disc and digital download formats. These re-releases do not follow the same release sequence as the original cassette albums, and were slightly reorganized. In addition, the original opening and closing wraps of all Jungle Jam and Friends episodes were edited to remove references to World Vision and Everland, and replaced with new wraps referencing Fancy Monkey Studios and the reorganized episodes. While most of the episodes from the cassette albums are retained in the CD and download re-releases, a few of them are excluded, most notably the "Sing-Along with Bert-the-Moose" segments, which served as a platform for promoting kid-friendly Contemporary Christian musical albums released by Word Entertainment. And while all the original episode titles stay the same, only one episode was renamed. "Bear E. Sleepy", a musical segment that originally appeared in the More Wild Times cassette album, became "The All-Bear Sing-Along".

A fourth collection, Yet Even Wilder Times Collection, contains most of the Jungle Jam and Friends episodes that do not appear in any of the original three albums, some of which have been produced and aired in recent years. It is currently available for purchase from Fancy Monkey Studios as downloads only.

"Open for Business", which appears in the Wild Times cassette album, was not a Jungle Jam and Friends episode. Instead, it was an excerpt from The Friendship Company: Open for Business (1991), a children's album by Contemporary Christian singer Sandi Patty. As such, it is also excluded from the re-releases.

In the original opening and closing wraps of "The Great Rubber Band War" (from the More Wild Times collection), Hal Smith, Will Ryan, and Katie Leigh — all voice artists involved in Adventures in Odyssey, a radio drama presentation produced by Focus on the Family — made brief appearances, voicing their respective characters John Avery Whittaker, Eugene Meltsner, and Connie Kendall. They all accidentally stumble into the room where Nathan Carlson and the Jungle Jam gang are doing their show, and are given correct directions to their room ("Just two doors down to the left"). Even Whit (voiced by Smith) is given the opportunity to read the following line used before the episodes start: "Stay tuned! Jungle Jam and Friends has just begun!".

"Three Wise Men and a Baby", a Christmas musical album, was not included in any of the original cassette sets. However, like other Jungle Jam and Friends musical albums, it is available separately, first on cassette tape, and later on CD and digital download. Eventually, it is now included in the re-release of Even Wilder Times.

== List of episodes ==
Please note: This episode list follows the original release sequence.

=== Wild Times in God's Creation ===
No. overall	No. in season	Title	Featured character(s)	Written by	Verse	Theme	Length
1	1	"A River Runs Over It" "A River Runs Through It"	Sully	Charlie Richards	Romans 12:6	everybody is special	15 min.
2	2	"Koalas in the Mist" "Gorillas in the Mist"	Gruffy Bear	Jeff Parker, Nathan Carlson	Proverbs 18:13	don't jump to conclusions	15 min.
3	3	"The Boy Who Cried Duck" "The Boy Who Cried Wolf"	Marvy Snuffleson	Jeff Parker, Nathan Carlson	1 Timothy 6:6	accepting who we are	15 min.
4	4	"Ain't Nothin' But a Hound Dog" "(Ain't Nothin' But a) Hound Dog"	Jean-Claude	Phil Lollar	Matthew 22:39	loving your neighbor	15 min.
5	5	"Golden Rocks and the Tree Pears" "Goldilocks and the Three Bears"	Cheetah Anita	Jeff Parker, Nathan Carlson	Psalm 62:8	trusting God	15 min.
6	6	"The Goodbye Merl" "The Goodbye Girl"	Marvy Snuffleson	Jeff Parker, Nathan Carlson	Colossians 3:25	gratitude	15 min.
7	7	"Sully Makes a Friend"	Sully	Jeff Parker, Nathan Carlson	Ephesians 4:32	kindness	15 min.
8	8	"Bjorn Free" "Born Free"	Marvy Snuffleson	Phil Lollar	1 John 4:7	obedience	15 min.
9	9	"Color Him Irresponsible" "Color Me Beautiful"	Jean-Claude	Phil Lollar	Matthew 25:21	responsibility	15 min.
10	10	"Pogo A Go-Go" "Monster A Go-Go"	Jean-Claude	Phil Lollar	Hebrews 13:16	sharing	15 min.
11	11	"The Terrible Truth About Lying" "The Terrible Truth About Liberals"	Marvy Snuffleson	Jeff Parker, Nathan Carlson	Proverbs 16:13	honesty	15 min.
12	12	"Badminton Schmadminton"	Gruffy Bear	Charlie Richards	Proverbs 6:6	cooperation	15 min.
13	13	"This Island Ain't Big Enough for the Both of Us" "This Town Ain't Big Enough for the Both of Us"	Marvy Snuffleson	Phil Lollar	Luke 12:32	courage	15 min.
14	14	"A Portrait of the Rabbits as a Young Family" "A Portrait of the Artist as a Young Man"	Racquet	Jeff Parker, Nathan Carlson	Romans 12:15	empathy / friendship	15 min.
15	15	"Lest Ye Be Judged" "(judge not) lest ye be judged"	Marvy Snuffleson	Phil Lollar	Matthew 7:1	judging others	15 min.
16	16	"The Treasure of the Sierra Marbles" "The Treasure of the Sierra Madre"	Sully, Millard	Phil Lollar	Proverbs 15:27	greed	15 min.
17	17	"Sing-Along with Bert-the-Moose"	Bert-the-Moose	Jeff Parker, Nathan Carlson, Phil Lollar	–	–	15 min.
18	18	"The Grandfather" "The Godfather"	Jungle Jam Gang	Jeff Parker, Nathan Carlson	Proverbs 16:28	gossip	15 min.
19	19	"Katie Sings the Blues" "Lady Sings the Blues"	Katie Snuffleson	Jeff Parker, Nathan Carlson	Philippians 4:11	contentment	15 min.
20	20	"Hermie the Love Bug" "Herbie the Love Bug"	Hermie	Jeff Parker, Nathan Carlson	1 John 4:7	love	15 min.
21	21	"Later: A Story About Procrastination"	Marvy Snuffleson	Phil Lollar	Proverbs 15:19	procrastination	15 min.
22	22	"Nermal and the Ark" "Noah and the Ark"	Nermal	Jeff Parker, Nathan Carlson, Phil Lollar	Matthew 6:25–34	God's care / provision	30 min.

=== More Wild Times in God's Creation ===
No. overall	No. in season	Title	Featured character(s)	Written by	Verse	Theme	Length
23	1	"It's Beginning to Look a Lot Like Bedtime" "It's Beginning to Look a Lot Like Christmas"	Gruffy Bear	Jeff Parker, Nathan Carlson	Luke 2:1–14	celebrating Christ's birth	15 min.
24	2	"The Gift of the RazzleFlabben" "The Gift of the Magi"	Marvy Snuffleson, Olaf, Carl	Phil Lollar	Romans 12:6	everybody is special	15 min.
25	3	"The Great Rubber Band War"	Marvy Snuffleson (as Marvin Carvey Snuffleson, Sr.)	Phil Lollar	Exodus 20:12	honoring parents	30 min.
26	4	"The Big Bang Theory" "The Big Bang theory"	Gruffy Bear	Jeff Parker, Nathan Carlson	Proverbs 18:24	making new friends	15 min.
27	5	"Who Owns Who?"	Marvy Snuffleson	Phil Lollar	Matthew 6:21	materialism	15 min.
28	6	"When You Wish Upon a Star" "When You Wish Upon a Star"	Millard	Phil Lollar	Ephesians 5:4	power of words	15 min.
29	7	"Sing-Along with Bert-the-Moose 2"	Bert-the-Moose	Jeff Parker, Nathan Carlson, Phil Lollar	–	–	15 min.
30	8	"Dial M for Monkey" "Dial M for Murder"	Millard	Jeff Parker	Hebrews 13:6	fear	15 min.
31	9	"The Whistling Furchettas"	Marvy Snuffleson	Jeff Parker	1 Corinthians 6:19–20	taking care of your body	15 min.
32	10	"The Cat's Pajamas"	The Kitty	Jeff Parker, Nathan Carlson	Proverbs 15:13	joy	15 min.
33	11	"Bear E. Sleepy" "The All-Bear Sing-Along"	Bear E. Sleepy, Gruffy Bear	Jeff Parker, Nathan Carlson, Phil Lollar	–	–	15 min.
34	12	"The Skunk Who Would Be King" "The Man Who Would Be King"	Racquet	Jeff Parker, Nathan Carlson, Phil Lollar	Romans 12:3	valuing others	15 min.
35	13	"Katie's Kiddie-Bake Quick Cakes"	Katie Snuffleson	Jeff Parker, Nathan Carlson	Isaiah 10:33	boasting	15 min.
36	14	"You Take the High Side" "You Take the High Road"	Millard	Jeff Parker, Nathan Carlson	Ephesians 4:13	cooperation	15 min.
37	15	"The Great Fall" "The Great Fall"	Marvy Snuffleson	Phil Lollar	Proverbs 16:18	pride	15 min.
38	16	"A Hog By Any Other Name" "a rose by any other name (would smell as sweet)"	Reynold	Phil Lollar	Psalm 139:14	uniqueness	15 min.
39	17	"My Left Upper Incisor" "My Left Foot"	Katie Snuffleson	Phil Lollar	Ecclesiastes 3:1	growing pains	15 min.
40	18	"The Great Coconut-Clunking Debate" "The Great Smoking Debate"	Millard	Phil Lollar	1 Corinthians 6:12	the dangers of addiction	15 min.
41	19	"It's a Wonderful — Knife?" "It's a Wonderful Life"	Marvy Snuffleson	Jeff Parker, Nathan Carlson	Joshua 1:9	don't be afraid	15 min.
42	20	"P-P-P-Peaceful"	The Sloth	Jeff Parker, Nathan Carlson	Romans 12:18	peacefulness	15 min.
43	21	"The Week of Saturdays" "The week of Sundays"	Marvy Snuffleson	Phil Lollar	2 Thessalonians 3:10	laziness	15 min.
44	22	"Mutiny at the Picnic" "Mutiny on the Bounty"	Gruffy Bear	Phil Lollar	Philippians 2:3–4	pride / selfishness	15 min.
45	23	"Katie in Candyland" "Babes in Toyland"	Katie Snuffleson	Jeff Parker, Nathan Carlson	1 Peter 3:8	compassion	15 min.

=== Even Wilder Times in God's Creation ===
No. overall	No. in season	Title	Featured character(s)	Written by	Verse	Theme	Length
46	1	"All God's Creatures Are Special"	Jungle Jam Gang	Jeff Parker	Psalm 139:13–15	everybody is special	1 hr.
47	2	"King of the Jungle"	Louis	Jeff Parker, Nathan Carlson	Philippians 2:9–10	trusting God	1 hr.
48	3	"Cheetah Bonita Goes Solo"	Cheetah Bonita	Jeff Parker, Nathan Carlson	1 Corinthians 3:8–9	cooperation	1 hr.
49	4	"Red, Yellow, Black, and — Plaid?" "Red, Yellow, Black, and White"	The Plaid Guy	Jeff Parker, Nathan Carlson	Romans 15:7	accepting others	1 hr.
50	5	"Fear, Faith, and Five Really Big Footprints"	Jungle Jam Gang	Jeff Parker, Nathan Carlson	2 Timothy 1:7	fear / faith	1 hr.
51	6	"To Have and Have Not" "To Have and Have Not"	Gruffy Bear	Jeff Parker	Colossians 3:15	thankfulness	15 min.
52	7	"The Trip to Thankful" "The Trip to Bountiful"	Millard	Phil Lollar	Matthew 6:21	contentment	15 min.
53	8	"Hermie Flies Again" "Herbie Rides Again"	Hermie	Jeff Parker, Nathan Carlson	Colossians 3:12	kindness	15 min.
54	9	"Sing-Along with Bert-the-Moose 3"	Bert-the-Moose	Jeff Parker, Nathan Carlson, Phil Lollar	–	–	15 min.
55	10	"Three Wise Men and a Baby" "Three Men and a Baby"	Jungle Jam Gang	Jeff Parker, Nathan Carlson	Luke 2:1–21	Christmas	1 hr.

=== Miscellaneous download-only episodes ===
No. overall	No. in season	Title	Featured character(s)	Written by	Verse	Theme	Length
56	1	"Where the Bears Are" "Where the Boys Are"	Sully, Gruffy Bear	Jeff Parker	Colossians 3:12	kindness	30 min.
57	2	"Racquet's Racket Racket"	Racquet	Nathan Carlson	Proverbs 15:27	greed	30 min.
58	3	"A Little Night Monkey" / "Eine Kleine Nacht Münkey" "Eine kleine Nachtmusik"	Millard, Steve Mozart	Jeff Parker, Nathan Carlson, Phil Lollar	–	the folly of jealousy	30 min.
59	4	"Educating Rita" "Educating Rita"	Racquet, Rita	Jeff Parker	Proverbs 21:5	being methodical	15 min.
60	5	"The Lord of the Wrongs" "The Lord of the Rings"	Nozzles	Jeff Parker	1 Corinthians 13:4–5	forgiveness	15 min.
61	6	"The Sound and the Furry" "The Sound and the Fury"	Gruffy Bear	Jeff Parker	2 Corinthians 5:7	the importance of faith	15 min.
62	7	"Driving Miss Lazy" "Driving Miss Daisy"	Rita	Jeff Parker	Proverbs 13:4	laziness	15 min.
63	8	"They Shoe Horses, Don't They?" "They Shoot Horses, Don't They?"	Jungle Jam Gang	Jeff Parker	Proverbs 14:30	envy	15 min.
64	9	"For Whom the Bear Tolls" "For Whom the Bell Tolls"	Gruffy Bear	Jeff Parker	Matthew 5:7	mercy	15 min.
65	10	"An Elephant's Generosity"	Nozzles	Jeff Parker, Nathan Carlson	Proverbs 22:9	generosity	15 min.
