= John Linder =

American politician (born 1942)

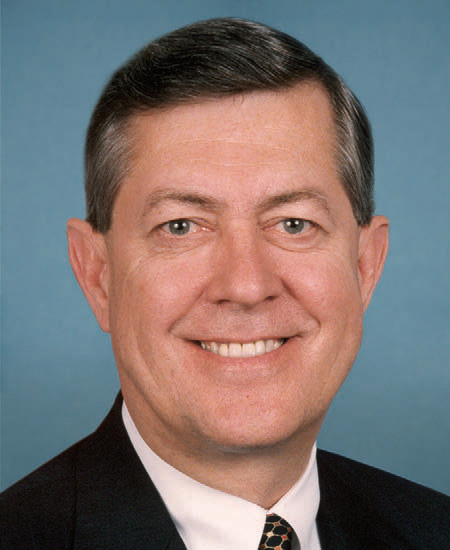

Member of the U.S. House of Representatives from Georgia
- In office January 3, 1993 – January 3, 2011
- Preceded by: Constituency established
- Succeeded by: Rob Woodall
- Constituency: 4th district (1993–1997); 11th district (1997–2003); 7th district (2003–2011)

Member of the Georgia House of Representatives from the 44th district
- In office January 10, 1983 – January 14, 1991
- Preceded by: Bruce Widener
- Succeeded by: Bart Ladd
- In office January 13, 1975 – January 12, 1981
- Preceded by: Harry Geisinger
- Succeeded by: Bruce Widener

Personal details
- Born: John Elmer Linder; September 9, 1942 (age 83) Deer River, Minnesota, U.S.
- Party: Republican
- Spouse: Lynne Linder
- Children: 2
- Education: University of Minnesota Duluth (BS, DDS)

Military service
- Branch/service: United States Air Force
- Years of service: 1967–1969
- Linder's voice Linder supporting the Healthy Forests Restoration Act of 2003. Recorded May 20, 2003

John Elmer Linder (born September 9, 1942) is an American politician who was a member of the United States House of Representatives from 1993 to 2011. His district was numbered the 4th from 1993 to 1997, the 11th from 1997 to 2003, and the 7th from 2003 until 2011. He is a member of the Republican Party.

Linder announced that he would retire from Congress at the end of the 111th Congress. In March 2019, he was announced as President Donald Trump's nominee to be the next United States Representative to the Association of Southeast Asian Nations; Linder was not confirmed and his nomination expired at the end of the Trump administration.

== Early life, education, and career ==
He was born in Deer River, Minnesota, was educated at the University of Minnesota Duluth, served in the United States Air Force, was a dentist and businessman, president of a lending institution, and a member of the Georgia House of Representatives where he served for seven terms.

== U.S. House of Representatives ==
=== Committee assignments ===
- Committee on Ways and Means
  - Subcommittee on Oversight
  - Subcommittee on Income Security and Family Support (Ranking Member)
  - Subcommittee on Select Revenue Measures

=== Party leadership ===
- Republican Steering Committee

Linder chaired the National Republican Congressional Committee, the campaign funding arm of House Republicans, during the 105th Congress. He was defeated for a second term as chairman after a poor showing in the 1998 mid-term elections.

In the 109th and 110th Congresses, Linder took a leadership role in the effort to enact fundamental tax reform. His legislation, the Fair Tax Act, 2005 (H.R. 25) and the Fair Tax Act, 2007 (H.R. 25), was a proposal for changing United States tax laws to replace all federal personal income taxes, payroll taxes, corporate taxes, capital gains taxes, self-employment taxes, gift taxes and inheritance taxes with a national retail sales tax and monthly tax rebate to households of citizens and legal resident aliens.

In 2006, he voted against renewal of the Voting Rights Act.

== Fair Tax Act ==
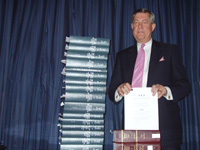
U.S. Rep John Linder holding the 132-page Fair Tax Act in contrast to the more than 50,000 pages of tax code laws and regulations currently in effect.

Linder is coauthor of The FairTax Book with radio talk show host Neal Boortz, which spent time atop the New York Times bestseller list. The book discusses H.R.25, also known as the Fair Tax Act, which Linder sponsored. They released a follow-up book FairTax: The Truth in 2008.

Linder first introduced the legislation in July 1999 to the 106th United States Congress. He has reintroduced substantially the same bill in each subsequent session of Congress. While the proposed bill has yet to have a major effect on the tax system, the Fair Tax Act has the highest number of cosponsors among tax reform proposals (attracting 76 in the 110th United States Congress), gathering much stronger support than popular flat tax legislation. A number of congressional committees have heard testimony on the FairTax; however, it has not been voted on in either Chamber. The bill is cosponsored by former Speaker of the House Dennis Hastert, but has not received support from the Democratic leadership. Matching legislation has been introduced into the Senate by Georgia Republican Senator Saxby Chambliss.

== Interest groups ==
Linder has worked with interest groups such as Americans for Fair Taxation as well as National Taxpayers Union. Since 1996 Linder has backed the National Right to Life Committee 100 percent of the time. Since 1996 Linder has backed the U.S. Chamber of Commerce at least 90 percent of the time except in 2005 where he backed them 75 percent of the time. Throughout his career he has supported groups like National Small Business Association, National Association of Manufacturers, National Restaurant Association, and Small Business & Entrepreneurship Council. He also has backed the interests of the NRA throughout his career.

== Campaign finance ==
A former dentist, Linder has received $40,100 from health professionals as well as $57,900 from the health sector as a whole. He also ran his own lending firm so he receives backing from the Insurance and Finance sector amounting to $86,839 as 12/31/2008. He has received $25,401 from the Construction industry and $25,300 from the Energy and Natural Resources industry. Overall in the 2008 cycle he has a total income of $581,976 of which he spent $375,540, and by the end of the cycle he had accumulated no debt at all.

== Voting record ==
Linder opposes abortion and has voted for anti-abortion legislation.

Linder voted against a minimum wage increase in 2007. Linder voted against the Dodd-Frank Wall Street Reform and Consumer Protection Act.

He voted in favor of the Military Commissions Act of 2006. He voted in favor of reauthorizing the PATRIOT Act in 2005. He opposed transferring prisoners from the Guantanamo Bay detention camp.

Linder voted against the Patient Protection and Affordable Care Act and the related Health Care and Education Reconciliation Act of 2010. He voted against the 2008 Medicare bill that was vetoed by George W. Bush. He voted against the re authorization of the State Children's Health Insurance Program (SCHIP) in 2007, and voted against the Family and Medical Leave Act in 1993.

He voted against reauthorizing the Voting Rights Act in 2006.

In 2006, he co-sponsored a measure to repeal the estate tax.

Linder voted in favor of the "Don't Ask, Don't Tell" Amendment in 1993, and voted against the Don't Ask, Don't Tell Repeal Act of 2010. He voted against the Local Law Enforcement Hate Crimes Prevention Act of 2007. In 2006, Linder voted in favor of the Federal Marriage Amendment (H.J. Res. 88), proposing an amendment to the United States Constitution to ban same-sex marriage.

Linder voted against legislation to limit the federal government's authority to prosecute medical marijuana users in states where medical marijuana is legal.

Linder voted against the Omnibus Public Land Management Act of 2009 and voted against the American Clean Energy and Security Act (H.R. 2454), which would have established a cap-and-trade system for carbon emissions. He voted against measures to shield the Arctic National Wildlife Refuge from drilling. He voted against the Water Resources Development Act of 2007. He voted against establishing the Sedona-Red Rock National Scenic Area and expanding the Casa Grande Ruins National Monument.

Linder voted against the DREAM Act, which would benefit undocumented youth who were brought to the United States as children. He voted in favor of Secure Fence Act of 2006, legislation to create a fence along the U.S.-Mexico border. He voted in favor of the Real ID Act of 2005. In 1996, he voted to designate English as the official national language.

In 1997, Linder voted for an amendment calling for the U.S. to withdraw from the United Nations; the amendment was rejected in a 54–369 vote.

== Criticisms ==
=== FairTax presentation ===
Some have criticized Linder, Neal Boortz, and Americans For Fair Taxation for the way they have presented the FairTax plan, a tax reform that replaces all federal income taxes with a single national sales tax on personal consumption above poverty level. The most common critique is the method of presenting the FairTax rate as a 23% sales tax. Under the plan, consumers would pay to the government $23 out of every $100 (referred to as tax inclusive): items priced at $100 would contain $23 of taxes. American sales taxes have historically been expressed as a percentage of the original sale price (referred to as tax exclusive): items produced at $77 pre-tax, cost $100 with the tax added (30% on top of $77). Congressman John Linder has stated that the FairTax would be implemented as an inclusive tax, which would include the tax in the retail price, not added on at checkout—an item on the shelf for five dollars would be five dollars total. The receipt would display the tax as 23 percent of the total. Linder states the FairTax is presented as a 23 percent tax rate for easy comparison to income tax rates (the taxes it would be replacing). Proponents believe it is both inaccurate and misleading to say that an income tax is 23 percent and the FairTax is 30 percent as it implies that the sales tax burden is higher, when in fact the burden of the two taxes is precisely the same. The plan's opponents call the semantics deceptive. FactCheck called the presentation misleading, saying that it hides the real truth of the tax rate.

The FairTax has also been questioned by Social Security groups which believe the economic assumptions of the FairTax are unsound. The basis of the FairTax is that taxes affect economic decisions. The FairTax would remove all payroll taxes. Yet, the impact analysis of Social Security done by the FairTax supporters claims that the FairTax will not change the number of beneficiaries under existing law. Under economic principles normally applied by the Linder and Boortz, removing the cost of participation would increase not only the number of beneficiaries but the size of claims.

=== Non-disclosed travel ===
Linder has also been criticized for omitting a trip paid for by a client of lobbyist Jack Abramoff from travel disclosure forms, even though he declared it on his personal income filings. According to John Byrne and Ron Brynaert of The Raw Story, "Linder should have filed a travel form shortly after his trip and could have corrected it when he belatedly filed for other trips last year. Failing to properly report sponsored travel is a violation of House rules."

== Political campaigns ==
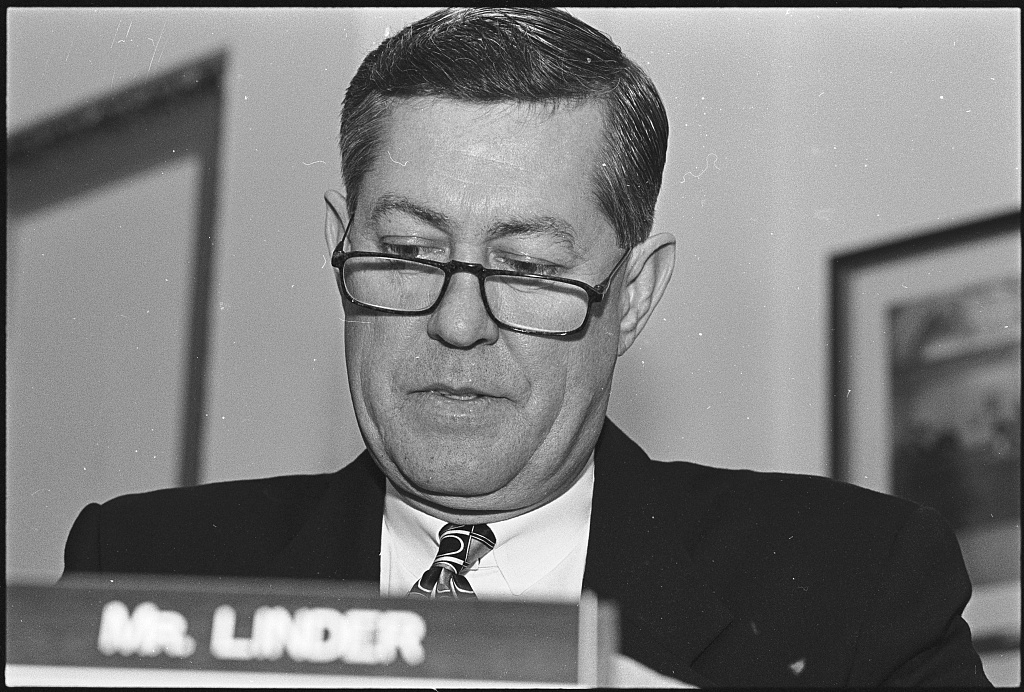
Linder at a meeting of the House Committee on Rules in 1995

Linder was first elected to Congress from the newly created 4th District in 1992, defeating state senator Cathey Steinberg by 2,600 votes. He would never face another general election contest anywhere near that close. His district was renumbered as the 11th District in 1997 after Georgia's previous congressional map was thrown out as an unconstitutional racial gerrymander.

Georgia gained two seats after the 2000 census, but the Georgia state legislature produced a map intended to produce a congressional delegation of seven Democrats and six Republicans. Linder and fellow Republican Bob Barr were drawn into a heavily Republican district that, while retaining Barr's district number (the 7th), contained more of the territory Linder had represented for a decade. Linder handily defeated Barr in the 2002 Republican primary, all but assuring him of a sixth term. Linder ran unopposed in 2004. In 2006, he was re-elected with 70.9% of the vote.

== Electoral history ==
Georgia's 4th congressional district: Results 1990–1994 Georgia's 11th congressional district: Results 1996–2000 Georgia's 7th congressional district: Results 2002–2008
Year	District	Democratic	Votes	Pct	Republican	Votes	Pct
1990	4th	Ben Jones	96,526	52%	John Linder	87,569	48%
1992	4th	Cathey Steinberg	123,819	49%	John Linder	126,495	51%
1994	4th	Comer Yates	65,566	42%	John Linder	90,063	58%
1996	11th	Tommy Stephenson	80,940	36%	John Linder	145,821	64%
1998	11th	Vincent Littman	53,510	31%	John Linder	120,909	69%
2000	11th	(no candidate)			John Linder	199,652	100%
2002	7th	Mike Berlon	37,124	21%	John Linder	138,997	79%
2004	7th	(no candidate)			John Linder	258,982	100%
2006	7th	Allan Burns	53,553	29%	John Linder	130,561	71%
2008	7th	Doug Heckman	128,158	38%	John Linder	209,349	62%

U.S. House of Representatives
Preceded by Ben Jones	Member of the U.S. House of Representatives from Georgia's 4th congressional district 1993–1997	Succeeded by Cynthia McKinney
Preceded by Cynthia McKinney	Member of the U.S. House of Representatives from Georgia's 11th congressional district 1997–2003	Succeeded by Phil Gingrey
Preceded by Bob Barr	Member of the U.S. House of Representatives from Georgia's 7th congressional district 2003–2011	Succeeded by Rob Woodall
Party political offices
Preceded by Bill Paxon	Chair of the National Republican Congressional Committee; 1997–1999	Succeeded by Tom Davis
U.S. order of precedence (ceremonial)
Preceded by Bill Shuster as Former U.S. Representative	Order of precedence of the United States as Former U.S. Representative	Succeeded by John F. Tierney as Former U.S. Representative
