= Jere Wood =

American politician

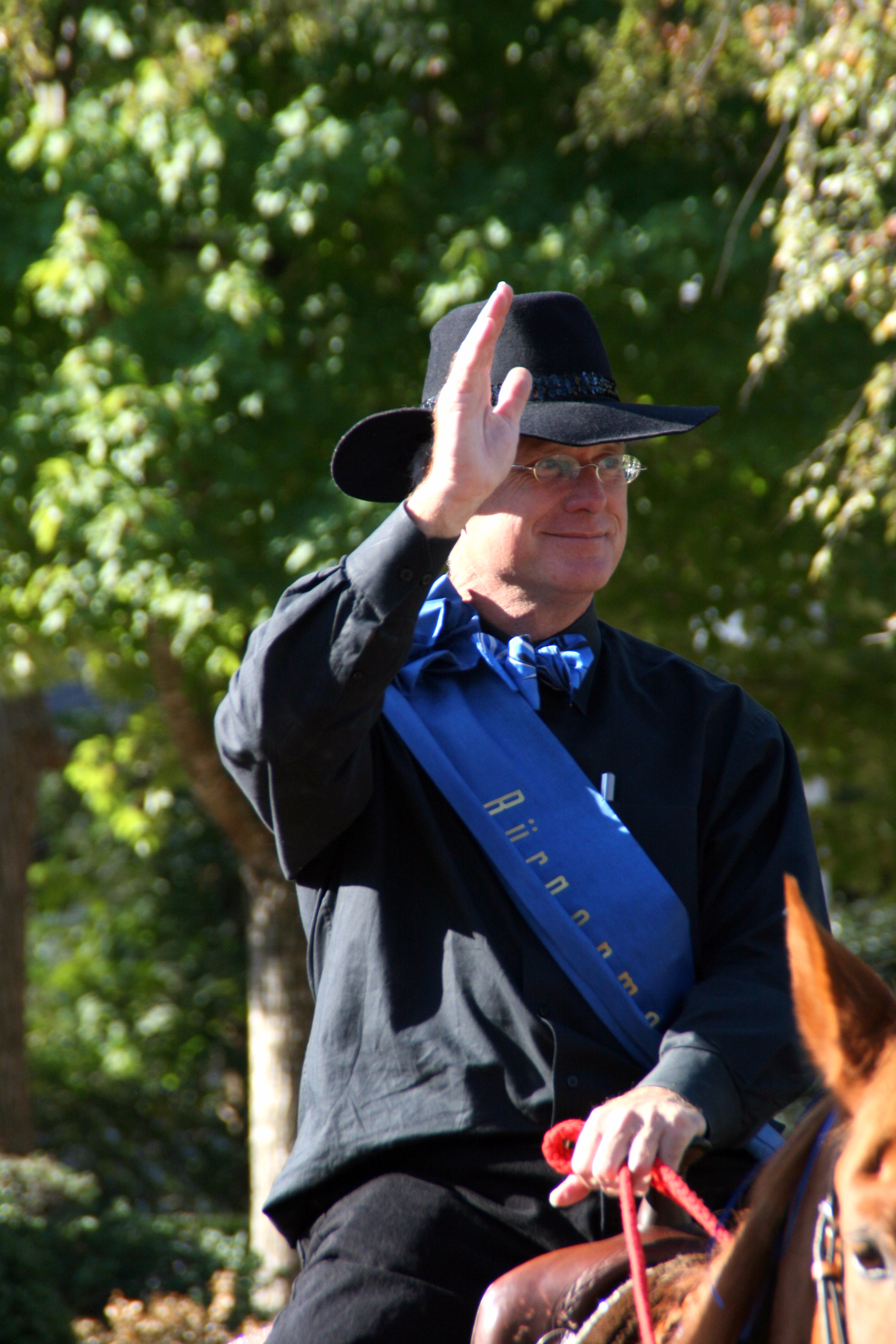

Mayor of Roswell, Georgia
- In office January 1, 1998 – January 8, 2018
- Preceded by: W. L. "Pug" Mabry
- Succeeded by: Lori Henry

Personal details
- Born: January 4, 1949 (age 77)
- Party: Republican
- Spouse(s): Claudia Wood (m. 2014) Judie Raiford
- Education: University of Georgia
- Profession: Attorney

Jere Wood (born January 4, 1949) is the former mayor of Roswell, Georgia, serving five consecutive terms. Mayor Wood defeated Democrat "Pug" Mabry, who served as mayor for over thirty years, in the election of 1997. During his election he ran on the platform of slow-growth, fighting urban sprawl and what he viewed as its negative side effects. At the time, he promised to only be a two-term mayor. He ran unchallenged and secured re-election in 2001. Wood is the son of Roy Kellum "Splinter" Wood, Jr., a Democrat, who was Undersecretary of the United States Department of the Interior (DOI) during the Carter Administration in the 1970s and Matilda "Tillie" King Wood. Wood won the mayor's race again in the election held in November 2005.

Mayor Wood is a member of the Mayors Against Illegal Guns Coalition, an organization formed in 2006 and co-chaired by New York City mayor Michael Bloomberg and Boston mayor Thomas Menino.

== Controversy ==
=== Letter to the FCC ===
During the attempted merger of Comcast and Time Warner Cable, a number of politicians sent letters to the FCC expressing their support. Wood was one of these, stating the merger would help spur business growth. It was later discovered that Wood had actually submitted a letter that had been ghostwritten by Comcast. Wood was just one of a number of politicians exposed by The Verge to have participated in such a practice.

=== Term limits ===
In 2016, Roswell resident Michael Litton filed a lawsuit accusing Wood of violating the city of Roswell's charter by seeking a third term as mayor. Wood, who was first elected in 1997, advocated in 2010 for the Roswell mayor to have a term limit of three four-year terms. He has said the intent was that the clock would start for him when the law was passed, and not when he was first elected.

Although Wood had enjoyed the support of State Representative Betty Price, she has since stated that she does not intend to amend the charter to allow Wood to run for a subsequent term. She had been willing to support a charter change that would allow the mayor to serve out his term, but no more. "My goal has been to save the city the expense of a costly trial," Price said. Since the start of the controversy, the city of Roswell has spent $16,843 through city attorney fees on defending Wood, as of mid-2016. On August 3, 2017, Wood was removed from office after a judge finding he did violate city law.

=== Suit against Roswell ===
In October 2016, Wood filed suit in Fulton Superior Court against Roswell and the Roswell Council Members over whether he could renovate his home. Wood's home is located in the Roswell historic district, which requires prior approval when renovating. He was initially granted approval by the Roswell Historic Preservation Commission to build a 1.5 story, 3,000 square foot house on his property. However, the city council later overturned the decision in August 2016. Wood alleged in the lawsuit that council members acted improperly by deciding the council had the legal authority to reverse the commission's earlier decision. State historic preservation laws allow "limited authority" for the council members to "approve, modify and approve, or reject" the historic commission's final decision, but only if it is found that the commission abused its discretion.

== Personal life ==
Wood often mountain bikes, wind surfs or kayaks. He earned his Eagle Scout Award during his youth and has been active in the Boy Scout program in the North Fulton area.

== See also ==
- List of mayors of Roswell, Georgia
