= Beth Moore (politician) =

American politician (born 1982)

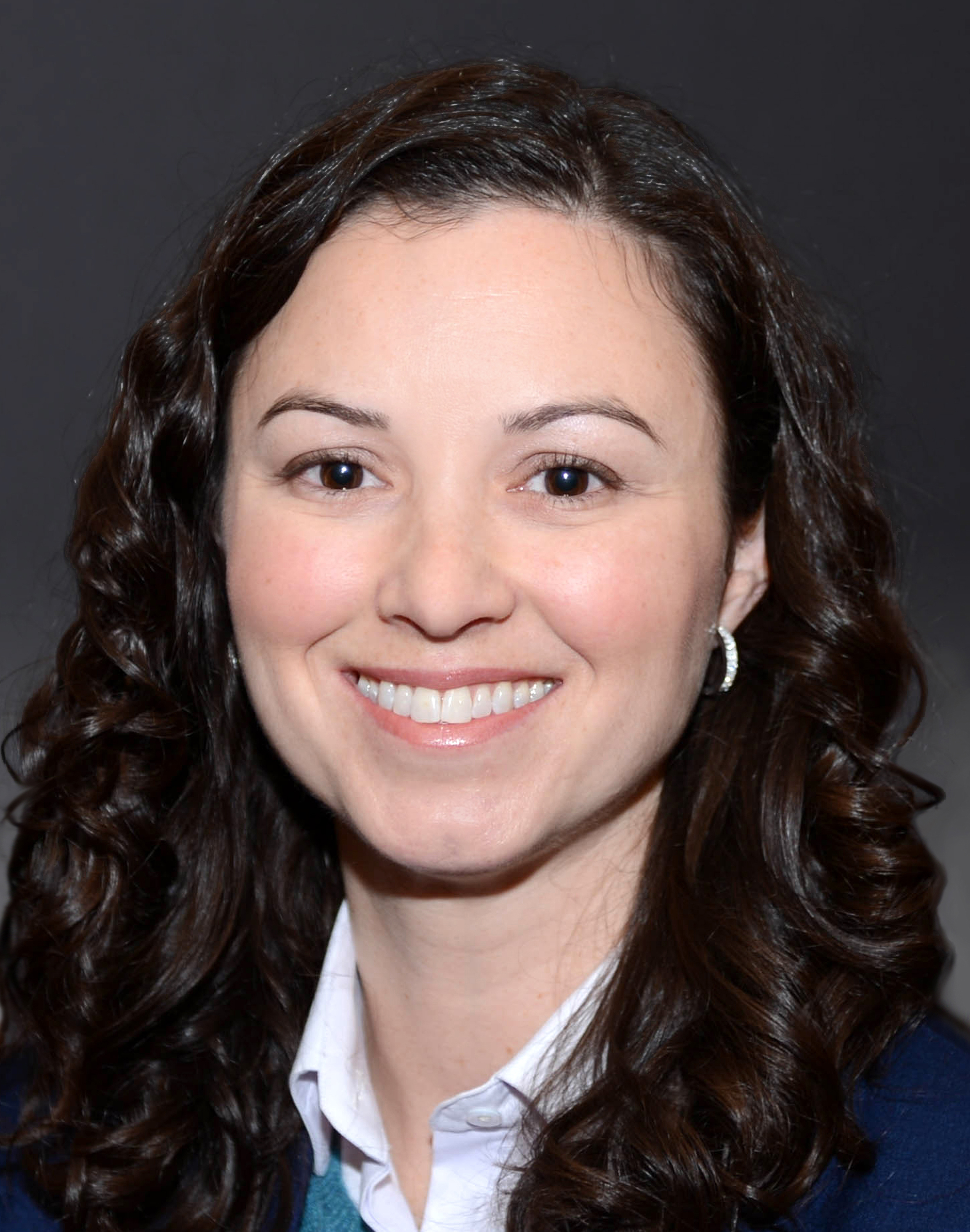
- Official portrait, 2018

Member of the Georgia House of Representatives from the 95th district
- In office January 14, 2019 – January 9, 2023
- Preceded by: Scott Hilton
- Succeeded by: Ruwa Romman (redistricting)

Personal details
- Born: February 27, 1982 (age 44) Dunwoody, Georgia, U.S.
- Party: Democratic
- Education: University of Georgia (BA); Georgia State University (JD)
- Profession: Entertainment Attorney

Elizabeth Bachman Moore (born February 27, 1982) is an American attorney and politician who served as a member of the Georgia House of Representatives from the 95th District from 2019 to 2023. She is a member of the Democratic Party. At the time, Moore represented part of Gwinnett and Fulton counties, including the cities of Peachtree Corners, Berkeley Lake, Duluth, Norcross, and Johns Creek.

Moore unsuccessfully ran for District 7 of the Georgia Senate in 2022, losing to Nabilah Parkes in the Democratic primary by 78 votes.

== Georgia State House of Representatives ==
=== 2019-2020 committee assignments ===
- Georgia State House Committee on Energy, Utilities, and Telecommunications
- Georgia State House Committee on Banks and Banking
- Georgia State House Committee on Science and Technology
- Georgia State House Committee on Information and Audits

=== 2019-2020 caucus and delegations memberships ===
- Gwinnett County House Delegation, Secretary
- Fulton County House Delegation
- State House Democratic Caucus
- State Legislative Women's Caucus
- State Legislative Entertainment Caucus
- State House Technology, Innovation, and Entrepreneurship Caucus

== Electoral history ==
=== 2020 ===
Georgia's 95th State House District General Election (2020)
Party	Candidate	Votes	%
Democratic	Beth Moore (incumbent)	16,055	55.7
Republican	Erica McCurdy	12,768	44.3
Total votes		28,823	100.00
Democratic hold			

=== 2018 ===
Georgia's 95th State House District General Election (2018)
Party	Candidate	Votes	%
Democratic	Beth Moore	12,101	51.4
Republican	Scott Hilton (incumbent)	11,442	48.6
Total votes		23,543	100.00
Democratic gain from Republican			

== Personal life ==
Moore lives in Peachtree Corners, Georgia. She first attended Wesleyan School in Peachtree Corners for high school. She subsequently earned her dual undergraduate degrees in Psychology and German from the University of Georgia in 2004 and her J.D. degree from Georgia State University College of Law in 2011. She divorced Lorie Moore in 2021. She owns her own entertainment law practice, the Beth B Moore Law Firm, that operates out of Peachtree Corners.

Georgia House of Representatives
Preceded by Scott Hilton	Member of the Georgia House of Representatives from the 95th district 2019–2023	Succeeded by Dar'shun Kendrick
