= Karen Bennett =

Karen Bennett may refer to:

- Karen Bennett (rower)
- Karen Bennett (politician)
