= Adam Cleveland =

American politician

Member of the Georgia House of Representatives from the 48th district
- Member-elect
- Assumed office January 11, 2027
- Preceded by: Scott Hilton

Personal details
- Party: Democratic
- Education: University of Georgia
- Website: Official website

Adam Cleveland is an American politician who is a member-elect of the Georgia House of Representatives, representing the 48th district. He was elected to the Georgia House of Representatives, in the general election on November 3, 2026. He is an attorney and small business owner from Johns Creek. Cleveland is Jewish.
