= 95th State House District =

95th State House District may refer to:

- Georgia's 95th House district
- Michigan's 95th House of Representatives district
- Pennsylvania House of Representatives, District 95
- Virginia's 95th House of Delegates district
