= Hermie =

Hermie may refer to:

- Hermie (slur), a pejorative term for an intersex person
- Hermies, a village in France
- Hermie, a character in Summer of '42
- Hermie and Friends, a Christian video series
- Hermie, a fictional character in The Smurfs
- Hermie, a character in Jungle Jam and Friends: The Radio Show!
- Hermie Sadler, a racing car driver
- Hermey, character in the TV special Rudolph the Red-Nosed Reindeer
