= Leasure =

Leasure is a surname. Notable people with the surname include:

- Althea Leasure (1953–1987), American magazine publisher
- Daniel Leasure (1819–1886), American soldier and physician
- Jack Leasure (born 1986), American basketball player
- Jordan Leasure (born 1998), American baseball player
- William Leasure (born 1946), American contract killer

== See also ==
- Leisure
