= Venola Mason =

American politician

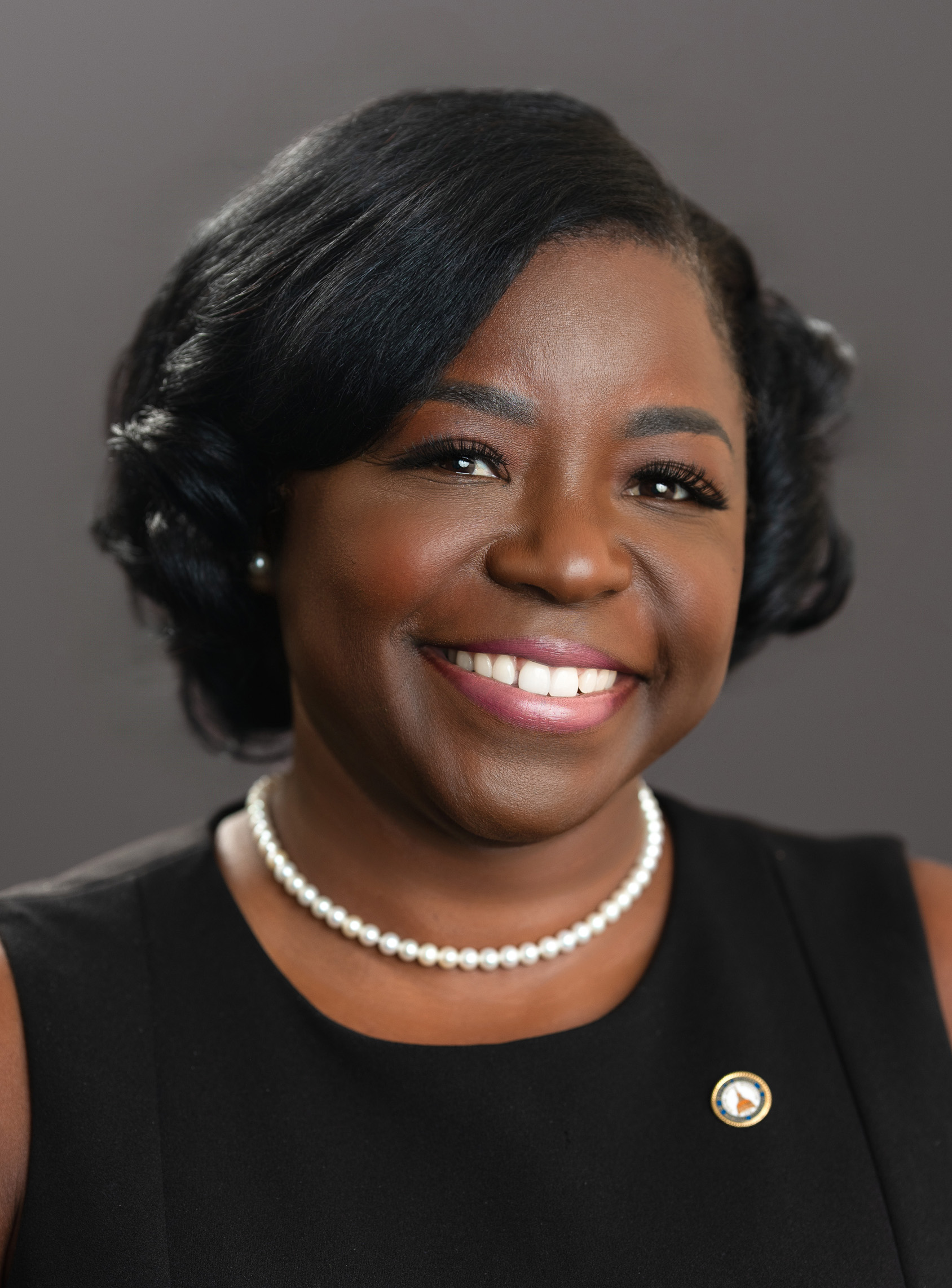
- Official portrait, 2026

Member of the Georgia House of Representatives from the 94th district
- Incumbent
- Assumed office April 18, 2026
- Preceded by: Karen Bennett

Personal details
- Born: 1979 or 1980 (age 46–47)
- Party: Democratic
- Education: Colby College (BA); Kennesaw State University (MEd)

Venola Lucrecia Mason (born 1979 or 1980) is an American educator and politician who is a member of the Georgia House of Representatives from the 94th district. A Democrat, she was elected in an April 2026 special election to succeed Karen Bennett, who pled guilty to making false statements to fraudulently obtain benefits. A former educator, Mason and her Crenshaw High School classmates were featured in Miles Corwin's 2000 book And Still We Rise.

== Early life and career ==
Mason grew up in Los Angeles, California and attended Crenshaw High School. During her senior year of high school, she and her Advanced Placement English classmates were featured in Miles Corwin's book And Still We Rise. She then earned a Bachelor of Arts degree in Spanish from Colby College in 2001 and a Master of Education in educational leadership and technology from Kennesaw State University in 2009.

Mason has worked as a Atlanta Public Schools teacher and educational consultant. In March 2020, Mason spoke on a panel about social–emotional learning at SXSW EDU.

== Georgia House of Representatives ==
After incumbent Democrat Karen Bennett resigned after pleading guilty to making false statements to fraudulently obtain Paycheck Protection Program loans, Mason filed to run in the March 2026 special election to replace her. Mason placed first in the nonpartisan blanket election with 44.2% of the vote, advancing to a runoff election with former Snellville mayor Kelly Kautz. She handily defeated Kautz with 68.5% of the vote in the April runoff election.
