= Jungle Jam and Friends: The Radio Show! =

American radio show

- Other names: Jungle Jam
- Running time: 25 minutes
- Country of origin: United States
- Language(s): English
- Created by: Fancy Monkey Studios, Inc.
- Original release: 1993 – present
- Website: www.fancymonkey.com

Jungle Jam and Friends: The Radio Show!, or simply Jungle Jam, is a children's radio show with Evangelical Christian themes and humor. The show was created by Jeff Parker and is owned by Fancy Monkey Studios, Inc. (formerly Woolly Mammoth Entertainment). It features voices, writing, and sound editing by Nathan Carlson, Phil Lollar, David Buller, and many others. These people have also been involved in other well-known radio projects, including Adventures in Odyssey.

== History ==
The program first aired in 1993 and within two years it had been aired on over 800 radio stations. Cassettes of the broadcast were available from Word Entertainment until the year 2000. At that point, the show was taken over by Fancy Monkey Studios, Inc., who sell CDs and downloads of the broadcasts. Jungle Jam continues to air, with the most recent episode, "The Merry Christmas Show," recorded in front of a live studio audience and released in 2010. The series features songs by award-winning husband and wife musicians, Buddy Miller and Julie Miller.

Around the late 1990s or early 2000s, Big Idea Productions bought the rights to make an animated spin-off series. However, Big Idea was in the process of working on other projects at the time, and the series never came into fruition. All that exists of the project is a piece of concept art by Jody Nilson. Jeff Parker, Nathan Carlson, and Phil Lollar even created and worked with Big Idea on the animated series 3-2-1 Penguins!.

== Storylines ==
The show is usually set in the jungle, although episodes occasionally take place elsewhere. Episodes follow a pattern: an introduction will be followed by a ten- to forty-five-minute story. The shorter stories end in an upbeat song; the longer episodes are divided into two parts and have songs scattered throughout. Although most episodes feature the Jungle Jam gang, some follow a boy named Marvy Snuffleson and his sister Katie and their visits to the remarkable RazzleFlabben Island. All episodes teach a lesson about the Bible or about Christian life.

== See also ==
- List of Jungle Jam and Friends: The Radio Show! characters
- List of Jungle Jam and Friends: The Radio Show! episodes
- Iliad House
