= List of mayors of Roswell, Georgia =

This is a list of mayors of Roswell, Georgia, United States.

Mayor	Entered office	Left office	Political party
Thomas Edward King		1863	
Merrill A. Bumstead	1883	1884	
George Washington Wing	1900 (approx.)	1900	
Charles C. Otwell	1904	1905	
William E. Sherman, Sr.	1905	1905	
Radford Green Broadwell	1907	1907	
John O. Crowley	1908	1909	
L.P. Hairston	1912	1915	
Harrison Monroe Broadwell	1922	1922	
Charles C. Foster	1923	1923	
Hugh Irby Weaver	1924	1925	
James Wilmont Jackson	1926	1926	
Eugene H. Wood	1926	1926	
William O. Bowden	1928	1928	
Ross A. Carruth	1929	1929	
James W. Hood	1930	1930	
Clifford P. Vaughn	1931	1934	
George "Nap" Rucker	1935	1936	
Clifford P. Vaughn	1937	1938	
Charles G. Webb	1938	1938	
James W. Hood	1939	1940	
Joseph Clyde Mansell	1941	1942	
James W. Hood	1943	1943	
Rogers Weaver	1943	1943	
Hugh Irby Weaver	1944	1944	
James Forrest Kirk	1945	1945	
Elijah Jake Coleman	1946	1946	
Hugh Irby Weaver	1947	1947	
Jesse L. Butler	1948	1948	
Virgil M. Garrett	1949	1949	
T.W. "Ford" Rucker	1950	1957	
Charles E. Abercrombie	1957	1962	
Aubrey E. Greenway	1963	1966	
William L. "Pug" Mabry	1967	1997	Democrat
Jere Wood	1998	2017	Republican
Lori Henry	2018	2021	
Kurt Wilson	2022	2025	Republican
Mary Robichaux	2026		Democrat

== Sources ==
- Roswell, A Pictorial History, Roswell Historical Society, Darlene M. Walsh (Editor), 2nd Edition, 1994, p. 253, ISBN 0-9615854-2-0.
