= List of Jungle Jam and Friends: The Radio Show! characters =

This is a partial list of characters in Jungle Jam and Friends: The Radio Show!.

== The Jungle Jam Gang ==
=== Regular characters ===
==== Narrator ====
The narrator (Nathan Carlson), often referred to as "Mr. Narrator" by the characters, is an interactive force in the jungle; there is some indication that he is a jungle explorer.

==== Gruffy ====
Gruffy Bear (Nathan Carlson), the de facto main character of the series, is a jovial and level-minded construction worker brown bear. He is the only primary character with a wife (Muffy), a child (Gruffy Jr), and a dog (Wuffy).

==== Sully ====
Sully the Aardvark (Nathan Carlson) is a simple-minded aardvark. Frequently noted as an excellent cannonball diver, he is the best friend of Millard J. Monkey. At one point he played the triangle in the Jungle Band.

==== Millard ====
Millard Jackanapes Monkey (Phil Lollar), usually referred to as Millard J. Monkey or Millard the Monkey, is a clumsy and foolhardy monkey. He is the best friend of Sully the Aardvark. Millard was a later addition to the cast of characters, but quickly became a central character and fan favorite.

==== Nozzles ====
Nozzles the Elephant (Nathan Carlson) is a brooding and usually wise African elephant. However, he is prone to giving in to the other animals' inanity. He is a lover of mystery novels and gadgets.

==== Racquet ====
Racquet the Skunk (Nathan Carlson) is an ambitious but kind-hearted skunk. He is frequently shown to be an excellent badminton player.

==== Jean-Claude ====
Jean-Claude the Flying Squirrel (Phil Lollar) is a somewhat self-centered French flying squirrel. Ironically, he pilots a biplane.

==== The Cheetah Sisters ====
Cheetah Bonita (Shelby Daniels), Cheetah Anita (Shelby Daniels), and Cheetah Sally (Julie Miller) are members of the musical group The Cheetah Sisters.

==== Sloth ====
The Sloth (Cindy Parker), also referred to as Sloth, is an easy-going sloth.

==== Weatherbee ====
Weatherbee the Owl (Phil Lollar) is a sensible owl who often acts as the leader or (judge) of the jungle.

==== Max ====
Max the Giraffe (Nathan Carlson) is a hair-brained giraffe.

=== Other recurring characters ===
==== Rita ====
Rita the Skunk (unknown voice actress) is the clever, michevious, and doted-on niece of Racquet the Skunk. She only appears in later-produced episodes.

==== Muffy ====
Muffy Bear (Nathan Carlson) is the supportive wife of Gruffy Bear.

==== Gruffy, Jr. ====
Gruffy Bear Jr. (Adam Burton), is the only child of Gruffy and Muffy Bear.

==== Bert-the-Moose ====
Bert-the-Moose (Nathan Carlson), is a moose who hosts a musical segment included in the "and friends" part of the show called "Sing Along With Bert-the-Moose." He is always followed by his Bert-the-Moose singing waiters.

==== Reynold ====
Reynold the Warthog (Phil Lollar) is a dry-humored and mud-loving warthog.

==== Hermie ====
Hermie the Love Bug (Nathan Carlson) is a misguided green lacewing. He is best friends with Gruffy.

==== Coy Ote ====
Coy Ote is a friendly Irish Wolfhound.

==== Flib ====
As the Theme Song is a repackaged version of "In the Jungle" from the Jungle Jam album, All God's Creatures Are Special, Flibbertigibbet the Owl, a.k.a. "Flib" (Buddy Miller) technically "appears" in every episode, but otherwise only shows up narratively and in-verse on said album. In the regular episodes he is replaced by Weatherbee the Owl. An unnamed background voice bearing his resemblance and cajun accent does occasionally appear in other episodes, especially in songs, but it's not made explicit that the voice belongs to said character.

== RazzleFlabben Island ==
=== Narrator ===
The narrator (Nathan Carlson) is the same as that of the Jungle Jam Gang.

=== Regular characters ===
==== Marvy Snuffleson ====
Marvin Carvey "Marvy" Snuffleson III (Adam Burton) is an elementary school student who gets carried away in a flash-flood to RazzleFlabben Island.

==== Carl and Olaf ====
Olaf (Nathan Carlson) and Carl (Phil Lollar) are adult RazzleFlabbenz and Marvy's two closest friends on RazzleFlabben Island.

==== Katie Snuffleson ====
Katie Snuffleson (Katie Herndon) is Marvy's little sister. She, too, has fallen victim to the mysterious flash-floods.

==== Mr. Snuffleson ====
Marvin Carvey Snuffleson II (David Buller), usually referred to as Mr. Snuffleson, is Marvy's caring father. As a child, he too was taken to RazzleFlabben Island.

==== Mrs. Snuffleson ====
Mrs. Snuffleson (Michelle Richards) is Marvy's mother.

==== Lars ====
Lars (Nathan Carlson) is often a level voice among the RazzleFlabbenz.

==== Bert ====
Bert (Phil Lollar) is a RazzleFlabben often found in places of authority (e.g., a judge, a conductor, etc.).

=== Other recurring characters ===
==== Ingmar Flabben ====
Ingmar RazzleFlabben (Phil Lollar), né Flabben, was the leader of the Flabbenz until he made his love for Ingrid public and joined the two peoples together.

==== Ingrid Razzle ====
Ingrid RazzleFlabben (Maureen Davis), née Razzle, was the leader of the Razzles until her marriage to Ingmar.

==== Sven Ingersoll ====
Sven Ingersoll is a magical, shape-shifting RazzleFlabben and is also the first RazzleFlabben Marvy meets.

==== Merl ====
Merl is the second RazzleFlabben to meet Marvy.

==== Bjørn ====
Bjørn (Nathan Carlson), also referred to as the Disobedient SmivenBiven, is a SmivenBiven held prisoner on RazzleFlabben Island.

=== Species ===
==== RazzleFlabbenz ====
Originally two peoples, the Razzles and the Flabbenz, they united after Mr. Snuffleson helped work out their centuries-old dispute. Though humanoid, they are exceptionally tall and covered in brightly colored fur. They highly prize eggplant parmigiana.

==== SmivenBivenz ====
The SmivenBivenz are a race of large, hairy, bad-tempered humanoid monsters with tails who live on the neighboring SmivenBiven Island.

- Bjørn (see above)
- Snork (Nathan Carlson) steals the valuable portraits of Ingmar and Ingrid RazzleFlabben and frames Marvy.
- a group of man-eating SmivenBivenz capture Katie.

==== Other species ====
- The side-winding furbellies are a race of malevolent cowboy creatures with furry bellies. Three, Larango (Phil Lollar), Durango (Nathan Carlson), and Hives (Nathan Carlson), attempt to overthrow RazzleFlabben Island and enslave the RazzleFlabbenz.
- The whistling furchettas are a race of small, simple-minded, good-natured, and sweet creatures who live homy lives on RazzleFlabben Island.
- The Rockport falcon is a giant, man- and furchetta-eating falcon.
