= Scott Hilton (politician) =

American politician

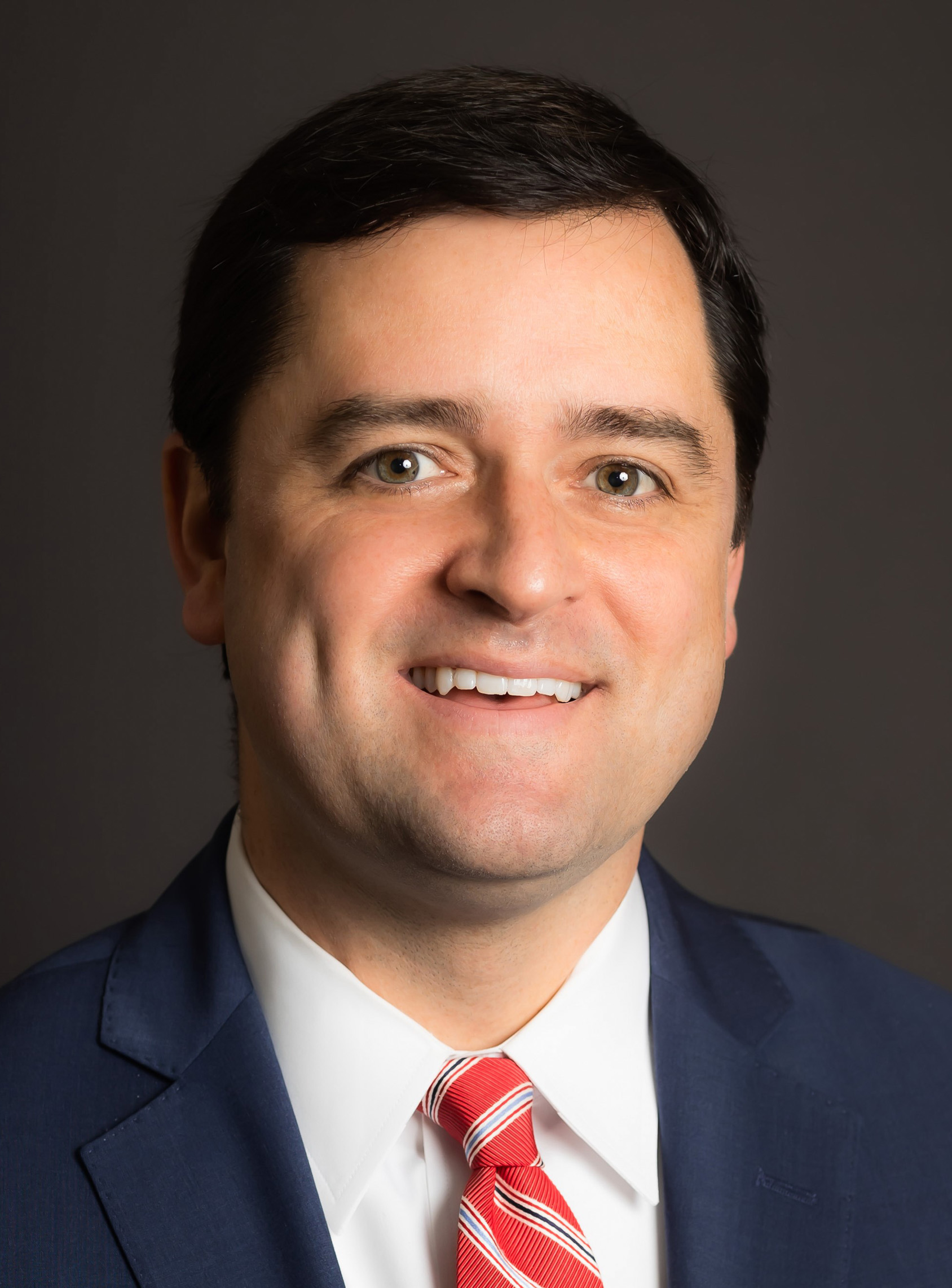
- Official portrait, 2025

Member of the Georgia House of Representatives from the 48th district
- Incumbent
- Assumed office January 9, 2023
- Preceded by: Mary Robichaux
- Succeeded by: Adam Cleveland (elect)

Member of the Georgia House of Representatives from the 95th district
- In office January 9, 2017 – January 14, 2019
- Preceded by: Tom Rice
- Succeeded by: Beth Moore

Personal details
- Born: November 20, 1979 (age 46) St. Petersburg, Florida, U.S.
- Party: Republican
- Spouse: Meredith Hilton
- Children: 3
- Education: Georgetown University; Emory University
- Occupation: Banker, Politician

Scott Hilton is an American politician representing the 48th District in the Georgia House of Representatives. He serves constituents in Peachtree Corners, Johns Creek, and Roswell. At the Capitol, Hilton is the vice chair of the House Education Committee where he has sponsored and passed legislation on education, social media protections for minors, and support for disabled Georgians. Hilton is also vice chair of the House Creative Arts and Entertainment Committee where he has passed legislation on film tax credits.

== Education and career ==
Hilton earned a bachelor's degree with honors in finance and international business with a minor in psychology from Georgetown University in 2002. Hilton earned a one-year accelerated MBA from Emory University in 2006.

From 2006 to 2016, Hilton was a senior vice president at Bank of America Merrill Lynch. In 2016, Hilton became the senior vice president of commercial banking at SunTrust Banks, which is now Truist Financial.

Hilton was Senior Vice President of Commercial Banking at SouthState Bank from March 2021 to Jan 2024. He is currently the Managing Director of High Peak Capital.

== Georgia House of Representatives ==
On November 8, 2016, Hilton won his election unopposed and became a Republican member of Georgia House of Representatives for District 95. He was sworn in on January 9, 2017. In November 2018, Hilton lost the election for District 95 with 48.60% of the vote. He was defeated by Beth Moore.

On November 8, 2022, Hilton defeated Democrat Mary Robichaux for election to District 48 with 54.3% of the vote and was sworn in on January 9, 2023.

On November 5, 2024, Hilton defeated Democrat Laura Murvartian with 54.9% of the vote.

At the 2026 election, he was unseated by Democrat Adam Cleveland.

Hilton has authored or sponsored dozens of bills on various issues. He is a member of the Republican Party. Hilton served as executive director for the Georgians First Commission under the Office of Governor Brian Kemp. Kemp fully endorsed Scott Hilton's reelection campaign.

== Political views and legislation ==
Hilton voted to lower the state of Georgia income tax rate, raise salaries for state law enforcement, increase funding for qualifying private schools, and increase funding to support public education and school safety.

Hilton serves as the vice chair of the House Education Committee. He has advocated for Georgia Promise Scholarship Act, a voucher program for private schools, though the bill itself was sponsored by other members of the House. Otherwise, critiques of the bill have cited concerns that the proposed $6,500 would not be sufficient to cover tuition for private schools. Hilton passed legislation banning the use of social media on school devices to ensure kids are focused during class- sponsoring Senate Bill 351.

Hilton advocated and passed legislation for individuals with disabilities to have higher wages and protection for hearsay in assault cases.

Hilton advocated for legislation restricting ticket venues from limiting ticket resales, in hopes of creating more consumer choice and lower prices. The bill was in response to ticket resales on the website Ticketmaster.

Scott led bipartisan effort to protect in vitro fertilization access by introducing a resolution that stated "there should be no question that in-vitro fertilization will remain available in the State of Georgia."

Scott sponsored multiple bills regulating water activities to encourage safe enjoyment of aquatic activities.

== Personal life ==
Scott and his wife, Meredith, live in Peachtree Corners where they raise their three children. Meredith owns a local law practice focused on wills and trusts. They are active members of Perimeter Church in Johns Creek. Scott serves in leadership roles for the Georgia Department of Behavioral Health and Developmental Disabilities, and Wesleyan School.

== Electoral history ==
2016 Georgia House of Representatives District 95 Republican primary
Party	Candidate	Votes	%	±%
Republican	Scott Hilton	2,300	70.97	
Republican	Jay Lowe	941	29.03	
Total votes		3,241	100.00	

2016 Georgia House of Representatives District 95 general election
Party	Candidate	Votes	%	±%
Republican	Scott Hilton	18,293	100.00	
Total votes		18,293	100.00	
Republican hold		Swing	{{{swing}}}	

2018 Georgia House of Representatives District 95 general election
Party	Candidate	Votes	%	±%
Democratic	Beth Moore	12,101	51.40	+51.40
Republican	Scott Hilton (incumbent)	11,442	48.60	−51.40
Total votes		23,543	100.00	
Democratic gain from Republican		Swing	+51.40	

2022 Georgia House of Representatives District 48 general election
Party	Candidate	Votes	%	±%
Republican	Scott Hilton	14,531	54.31	
Democratic	Mary Robichaux (incumbent)	12,223	45.69	
Total votes		26,754	100.00	
Republican gain from Democratic		Swing	{{{swing}}}	

2024 Georgia House of Representatives District 48 general election
Party	Candidate	Votes	%	±%
Republican	Scott Hilton (incumbent)	18,183	54.87	+0.56
Democratic	Laura Murvartian	14,954	45.13	−0.56
Total votes		33,137	100.00	
Republican hold		Swing	+0.56	

2026 Georgia House of Representatives District 48 general election
Party	Candidate	Votes	%	±%
Democratic	Adam Cleveland	14,086	50.81	+5.68
Republican	Scott Hilton (incumbent)	13,636	49.19	−5.68
Total votes		27,722	100.00	
Democratic gain from Republican		Swing	-5.68	
