= Karen Bennett (politician) =

American politician (born 1956)

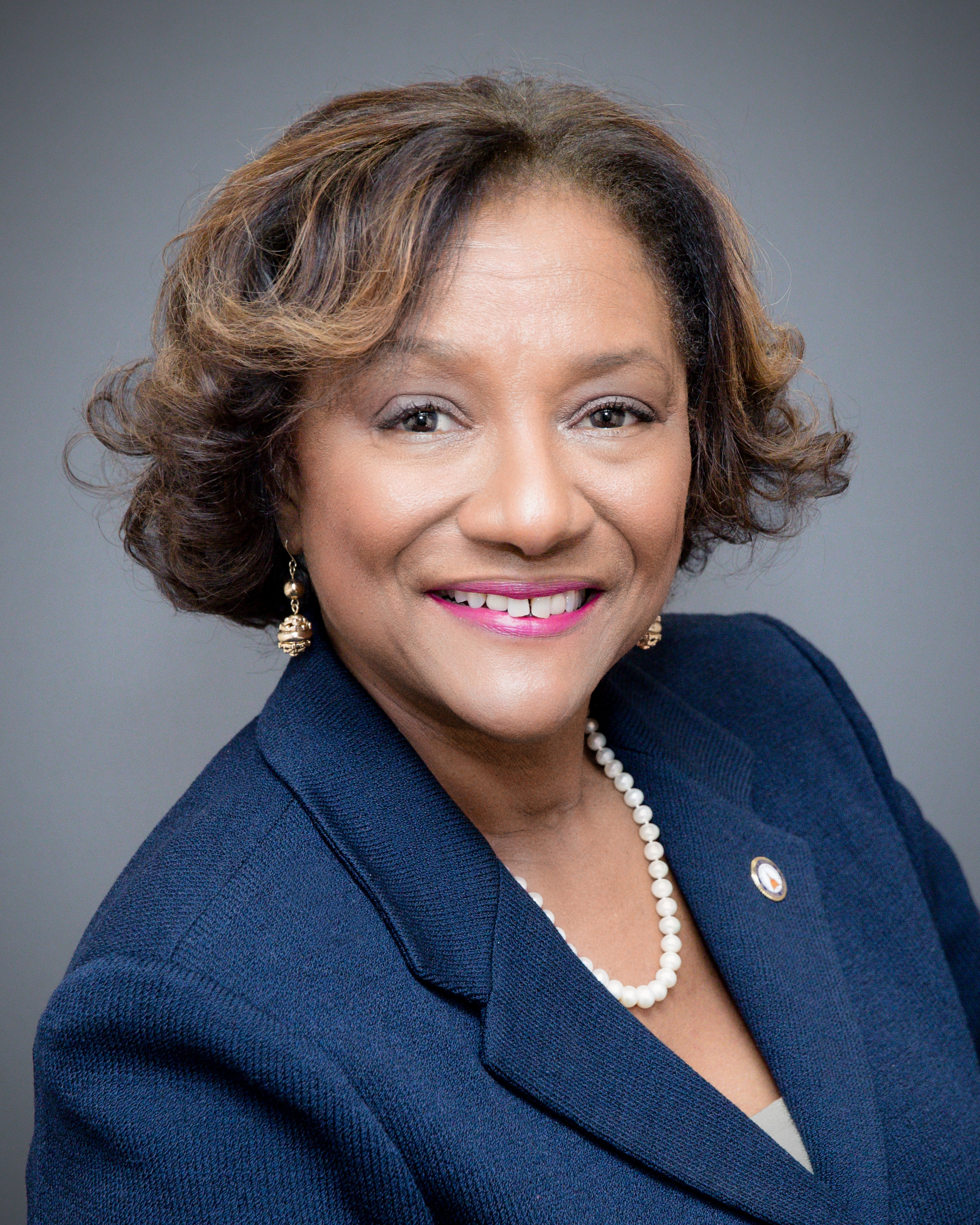
- Official portrait, 2018

Member of the Georgia House of Representatives from the 94th district
- In office January 14, 2013 – December 31, 2025
- Preceded by: Dar'shun Kendrick
- Succeeded by: Venola Mason

Personal details
- Born: January 10, 1956 (age 70)
- Party: Democratic

Karen L. Bennett (born January 10, 1956) is an American politician. She was a member of the Georgia House of Representatives from the 94th District, from 2013 to 2025.

Bennett has sponsored 150 bills. She is a member of the Democratic party.

== Legal issues ==
On January 5, 2026, Bennett was indicted by a federal grand jury in the U.S. District Court for the Northern District of Georgia on one count of making false statements in connection with benefits. The charges allege that between March and August 2020, she fraudulently obtained approximately $13,940 in Pandemic Unemployment Assistance (PUA) benefits by falsely claiming that the COVID-19 pandemic disrupted her work as a physical therapist with Metro Therapy Providers, Inc., and by failing to disclose weekly income of approximately $905 from employment with a church.

Prosecutors stated that Bennett's role at Metro Therapy Providers was administrative and performed from a home office, allowing the business to continue operating with only a brief disruption. Bennett initially pleaded not guilty and was released on a $10,000 bond. She later pleaded guilty. She became the second Democratic member of the Georgia House of Representatives to face similar federal charges related to pandemic-era unemployment benefits, following Rep. Sharon Henderson in December 2025.
