= William Leasure =

American criminal (born 1946)

William Ernest Leasure (born 1946) is an American murderer and former police officer. While an officer with the Los Angeles Police Department (LAPD), he was involved in two contract killings.

== Background and career ==
Leasure was a Los Angeles Police Department officer assigned to the Central Traffic Division. At the time of his arrest, Leasure had been a police officer for 16 years.

== Criminal activity and trial ==
=== Investigation and arrest ===
On May 29, 1986, Leasure and two others planned to meet with an unnamed buyer in order to sell one of the stolen yachts. Unbeknownst to them, the buyer had called the police, suspecting the yacht had been stolen. When Leasure and his associates arrived at the Richmond Marina, they were met by members of the Oakland Police Department, who took them into custody.

After Leasure's arrest, Internal affairs officers from the LAPD began questioning Leasure's previous partners on the police force and searched his homes. They quickly determined that Leasure had been involved in the theft of up to 20 boats and began to suspect that Leasure was also involved in drug and weapons trafficking. As the probe widened, agents from the Drug Enforcement Administration, Bureau of Alcohol, Tobacco and Firearms, and the Internal Revenue Service began investigating Leasure as well. On June 4, 1986, Leasure's bail was increased to $1 million in light of the investigation's increasing scope.

On September 25, 1986, Leasure's bail was decreased to $10,000 by a judge in Contra Costa County but was increased to $500,000 the next day after LAPD internal affairs testified that he posed a significant flight risk. On December 7, 1986, an LAPD officer alleged that Leasure had also participated in two contract killings in 1977 and 1981. In February 1987, a second police officer and an assistant city attorney were charged with perjury for statements made during the Leasure investigation. In April 1987, a review board recommended Leasure be removed from the LAPD.

=== Trial ===
On May 22, 1987, Leasure was charged with two counts of murder for helping plan and carry out contract killings in 1980 and 1981 and was named a suspect in the 1977 contract killing. Those charges were in addition to the pre-existing theft and fraud charges related to the stolen yacht ring. On June 23, 1988, a review board again recommended that Leasure be fired from the police force.

Despite being arrested in 1986, Leasure was not formally put on trial until April 1991. The case faced a series of delays—first the trials of his partners, continuances for his lawyers to focus on other cases, the deaths of some witnesses, and the refusal of a key witness to testify. While awaiting trial, Leasure was held in the Los Angeles County Jail. On June 27, 1991, the judge declared a mistrial as the jury was deadlocked 10–2 on whether Leasure was guilty. On November 1. 1991, Leasure pleaded no-contest in his second trial to two counts of second-degree murder.

== Incarceration and legacy ==
Leasure was sentenced to at least fifteen years in prison on December 12, 1991. He was granted parole in 2020, but the decision was overturned by California Governor Gavin Newsom. Leasure was released in March 2025.

According to Miles Corwin, who spent a year embedded with the LAPD while writing his book Homicide Special, Leasure was described by LAPD officers as "the most corrupt cop in L.A." Leasure is the subject of Edward Humes' 1992 book Murderer with a Badge.
