= An Inconvenient Tax =

- Theatrical release poster
- Directed by: Christopher P. Marshall
- Written by: Vincent Vittorio
- Produced by: Nathaniel Thomas McGill; Vincent Vittorio
- Starring: Noam Chomsky; Ron Paul; Steve Forbes; Mike Huckabee; Herman Cain; David Walker; Charles Rossotti; Joseph Thorndike; Michael Graetz; Daniel Shaviro; Leonard Burman
- Cinematography: Nathaniel Thomas McGill
- Music by: Lewis Hurrell
- Release date: April 15, 2010
- Running time: 78 minutes
- Country: United States
- Language: English

An Inconvenient Tax is a 2010 documentary film produced by Life Is My Movie Entertainment. The film explores the history of the income tax in the United States and the causes of its many complexities.

== Synopsis ==
An Inconvenient Tax examines the Federal Income Tax and how Congress uses the complex tax code to achieve political goals that are unrelated to raising revenue. The result of 95 years of additions, subtractions, deductions, and exclusions, the 62,000 page tax code is so complex that many are voicing their desire to greatly simplify it or to even completely remove it. Currently, tax revenue cannot even pay for government spending. The film follows the progression of taxation through wars, economic booms, and significant presidencies in U.S. history. An Inconvenient Tax includes commentary from some of the nation's best-known economic experts, commentators, and political voices. Noam Chomsky, Ron Paul, Steve Forbes, Joseph Thorndike, Mike Huckabee, Charles Rossotti, David Walker, Neal Boortz, Herman Cain, Michael Graetz, Daniel Shaviro, Leonard Burman, and others discuss perceived problems in the American tax code, and also suggest possible changes. The possible solutions discussed include the FairTax, flat tax, and value added tax (VAT).

An Inconvenient Tax was officially released on Tax Day – April 15, 2010.

== Press ==
- On April 11, 2011, Life Is My Movie Entertainment announced that An Inconvenient Tax had been acquired by Gravitas Ventures and would be distributed through cable, satellite, telco, and online Video-on-Demand (VOD) in June of that year.
- On July 4, 2011, LIMM announced that the film would be available for international release through Octapixx Worldwide.

== Reception ==
The film received positive reviews from mainly right-leaning critics. The Swash, a libertarian news site, called the film a “must see, especially to those who are actually ignorant of what it really is, how it came to be and how it should be.” Another conservative critic said that it was a great way to “learn quite a bit in a fairly enjoyable fashion.” Director Christopher P. Marshall and producer Vincent Vittorio were interviewed on FOX Business Channel's Stossel show with John Stossel on April 15, 2011.

== See also ==
- Consumption Tax
- Income Tax
- IRS
- Tax Policy Center
- Tax Reform
