= The FairTax Book =

2005 book by Neal Boortz and John Linder

- Author: Neal Boortz; John Linder
- Language: English
- Subject: Politics; Economics; Taxes; Public policy
- Genre: Current events Politics
- Publisher: Regan Books
- Publication date: 2005
- Publication place: United States
- Pages: 208
- ISBN: 978-0-06-087541-1 (HC); ISBN 0-06-087541-0 (HC); ISBN 978-0-06-087549-7 (PB); ISBN 0-06-087549-6 (PB)
- OCLC: 61158233
- LC Class: HJ4652 .B65 2005
- Followed by: FairTax: The Truth: Answering the Critics

The FairTax Book is a non-fiction book by libertarian radio talk show host Neal Boortz and Congressman John Linder, published on August 2, 2005, as a tool to increase public support and understanding for the FairTax plan. Released by ReganBooks, the hardcover version held the #1 spot on the New York Times Best Seller list for the last two weeks of August 2005 and remained in the top ten for seven weeks. The paperback reprint of the book in May 2006 contains additional information and an afterword. It also spent several weeks on the New York Times Best Seller list. Boortz stated that he donates his share of the proceeds to charity to promote the book.

FairTax: The Truth – 272 pages, ISBN 978-0-06-154046-2

The book was published as a companion to the Fair Tax Act of 2005, which was a bill in the 109th United States Congress for changing tax laws to replace the Internal Revenue Service (IRS) and all federal income taxes (including AMT), payroll taxes (including Social Security and Medicare taxes), corporate taxes, capital gains taxes, gift taxes, and estate taxes with a national retail sales tax, to be levied once at the point of purchase on all new goods and services. The proposal also calls for an advance monthly tax rebate to households of citizens and legal resident aliens, to "untax" purchases up to the poverty level. The bill was reintroduced in January 2007 as the Fair Tax Act of 2007.

The sequel to The FairTax Book, FairTax: The Truth: Answering the Critics, was released by HarperCollins on February 12, 2008. The book was published as a follow-up to answer questions and respond to critics of the FairTax plan, and achieved #4 on the New York Times Best Seller list for the week of March 2, 2008, for paperback nonfiction.

== See also ==
- Americans For Fair Taxation
