= Tom Rice (Georgia politician) =

American politician

Member of Georgia House of Representatives for District 95
- In office 1997–2017
- Preceded by: Rodney Mims Cook Sr.
- Succeeded by: Scott Hilton

Personal details
- Party: Republican
- Spouse(s): Ann Rice (m. 1963, died 2000); Frances Rice (m. 2001)
- Education: Temple University

Tom Rice is an American politician. He was a member of the Georgia House of Representatives from 1997 to 2017, where he chaired the House Motor Vehicles Committee from 2005 to 2015.

== Education and Career ==
Rice graduated from Temple University in 1962 with a bachelor's degree in accounting. While attending Temple, he played on the school's football and baseball teams. Rice served in the United States Army Reserve from 1962 to 1968. He worked as a marketing executive for IBM and the managing partner of The Quality Group, a developer of electronic learning systems.

== Georgia House of Representatives ==
Rice was first elected to the Georgia House of Representatives in 1996 for District 79. He was reelected consecutively until his retirement in 2017. Due to successive redistricting efforts in Georgia, Rice represented District 64, District 51, and District 95.

In addition to serving as the Chairman of the Motor Vehicles Committee, Rice was a member of the House Ways and Means, Rules, and Appropriations Committees.

== Personal Life ==
Rice and his wife, Frances, live in Norcross, Georgia. Collectively, they have four children and ten grandchildren.
