= Neal Boortz =

American author, journalist, radio host (born 1945)

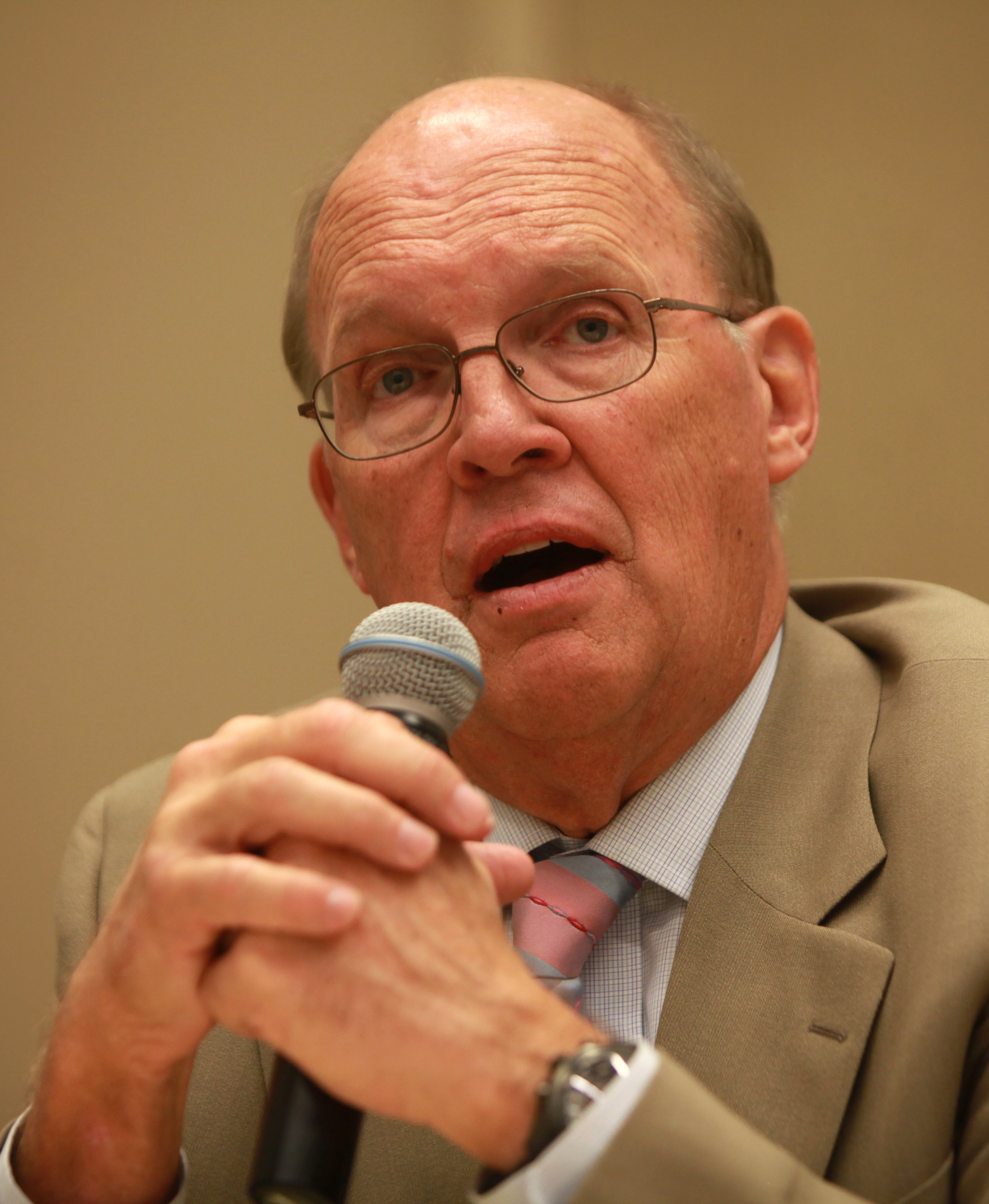
- Boortz in 2014
- Born: Neal A Boortz Jr. April 6, 1945 (age 81); Bryn Mawr, Pennsylvania, U.S.
- Other name: The Talkmaster
- Education: Pensacola High School; Texas A&M University; John Marshall Law School
- Occupations: Radio host, author, attorney
- Spouse: Donna Boortz
- Children: 1

Neal A Boortz Jr. (born April 6, 1945) is an American author, former attorney, and former libertarian radio host. His nationally syndicated talk show, The Neal Boortz Show, which ended in 2013, was carried throughout the United States. The content of the show included politics, current events, social issues, and topics of interest, which Boortz discussed with callers, correspondents, and guests. Boortz touched on many controversial topics.

Boortz's first involvement with radio was in the 1960s, while he was a student at Texas A&M University, working as a local on-air personality at WTAW. After moving to Georgia, he became an avid listener of Atlanta's first talk radio station. Boortz became a regular caller to the morning talk show. When the show's host died, it created a job opening, which Boortz actively pursued. He was initially hired on a two-week "trial run", and later offered the permanent position. Boortz attended law school, earning a law degree in 1977. For some years he worked as both an attorney and as a talk show host. He eventually closed his law practice after 17 years to concentrate on his work in radio.

Boortz has received many industry accolades. He was named as one of the "25 Most Important Radio Talk Show Hosts in America" by Talkers magazine, and one of "Georgia's 100 Most Influential People" by Georgia Trend. In 2009, Boortz was inducted into the Radio Hall of Fame.

Boortz's first book was The Commencement Speech You Need To Hear in 1997, followed by The Terrible Truth About Liberals, in 1998. In 2005, he co-wrote The FairTax Book with Congressman John Linder, proposing to implement a variant of a national retail sales tax in lieu of other federal taxes. Boortz's involvement with the FairTax is covered in the documentary film An Inconvenient Tax.

== Biography ==
=== Early life and education ===
Boortz was born in Bryn Mawr, Pennsylvania, his mother's home. His father, Neal Adolph Boortz Sr., was a Marine Corps pilot, who served in World War II, the Korean War and Vietnam War. Describing himself as a "military brat", Boortz lived in many locations throughout the country (including the small community of Thrall, Texas). He spent his first two years of high school at Tustin Union High School in Tustin, California. The family then moved to Florida. Boortz graduated from Pensacola High School, in 1963. He attended Texas A&M University, but did not graduate. Boortz later attended John Marshall Law School, in Atlanta, Georgia, graduating in 1977 and passing the Georgia bar.

== Careers ==
=== Law school and radio ===
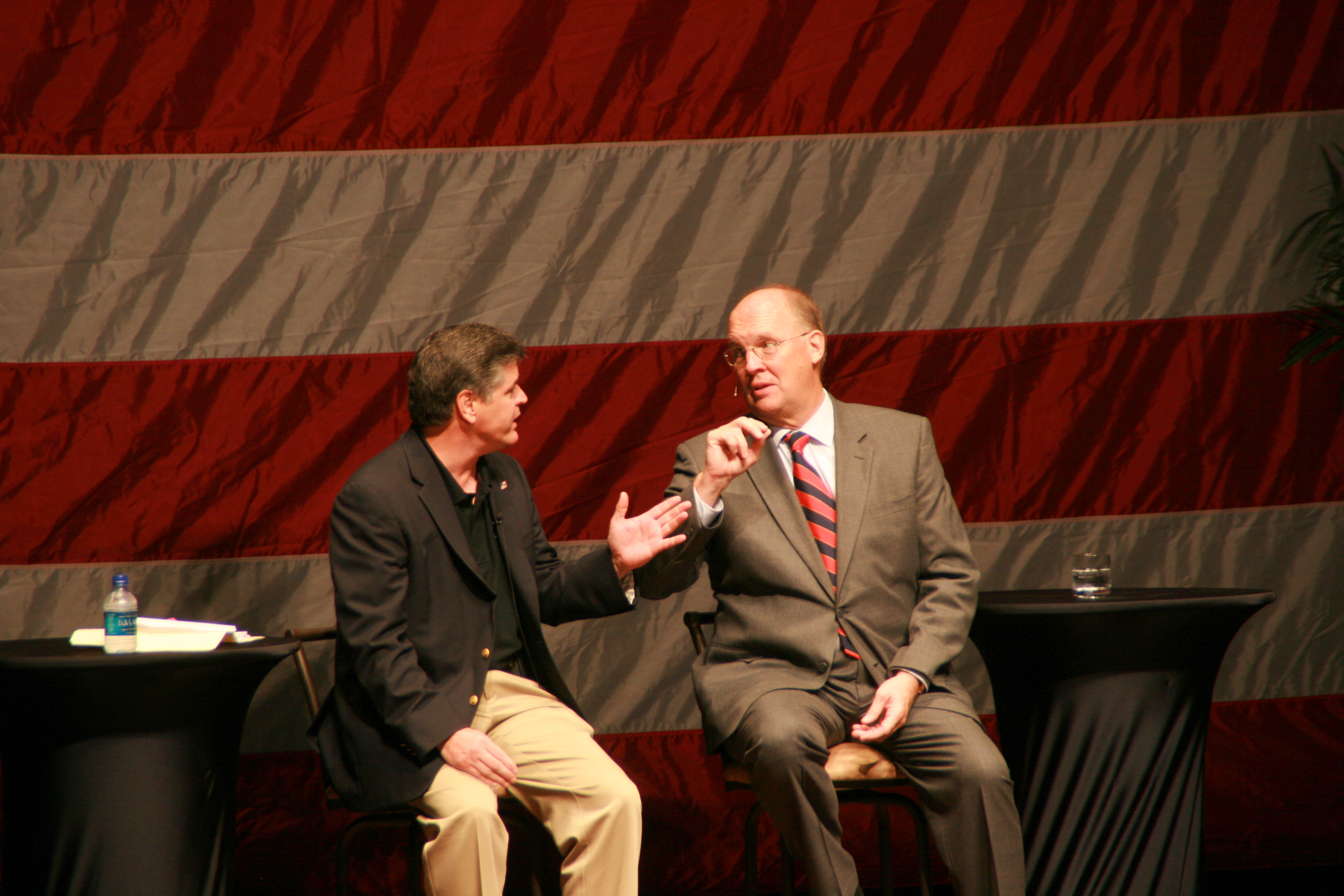
Boortz and Sean Hannity in 2008

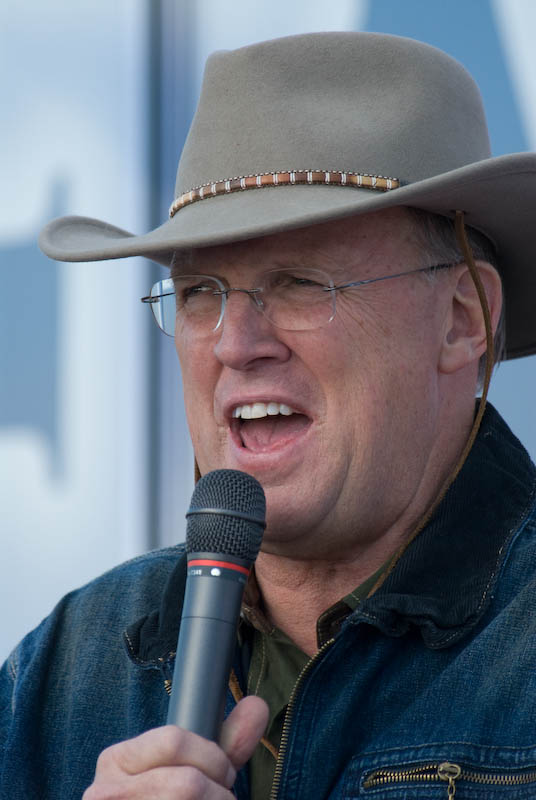
Neal Boortz at a FairTax Rally in February 2008

Boortz began his radio career in College Station, Texas, in the 1960s at WTAW, under the name of Randy Neal, while attending Texas A&M University. In 1967, after leaving Texas, Boortz moved to Atlanta and landed a sales job. For two years, he worked at Rich's Department Store, where he sold jewelry and carpeting. He later recollected that one of his customers was Martin Luther King Jr. During that time, Boortz was an avid listener of AM 680 WRNG (now WCNN). The station called itself "Ring Radio", as in the ring of a telephone. It was Atlanta's first talk radio station. Boortz listened to morning talk-show host, Herb Elfman, and soon became a devotee. "Boortz bombarded Elfman with calls, reading him little scripts he'd scribbled."

While watching the news one evening, he heard that Elfman had committed suicide. The next morning, Boortz showed up at the front door of WRNG and announced that he was ready to take Elfman's place. Though the management told him, "they were going to search for a 'qualified' host to take his place," Boortz was offered the role of temporary two-week replacement. In the interim, the evening host was moved to mornings and Boortz hosted the evening time slot. Two weeks later, Boortz was moved to the morning show, embarking on an Atlanta talk radio career that spanned more than 40 years. Boortz honed his skills at the tiny 1,000-watt station, and even wrote a few speeches for then Georgia Governor Lester Maddox. He continued working at the station until 1974, when WRNG "dumped him." He was offered a job at radio station WGY in Schenectady, New York, but turned the offer down to return to Atlanta and enroll in law school. In 1974, Boortz enrolled in then-unaccredited John Marshall Law School (Atlanta), going to class in his spare time, while his wife Donna and he worked full-time loading mail trucks. Boortz credits his wife with providing "the money to keep me in law school." After graduating from law school in 1977, Boortz practiced law in a solo law firm from 1977 through 1993. During that period, he divided his time between his law practice and work in radio. One of Boortz's clients was boxer Evander Holyfield, who later sued Boortz and other members of his management team in the aftermath of a failed Subaru car dealership investment. Boortz told Atlanta, "It had nothing to do with representing him as a boxer. It was settled and disappeared." Sometime later, in a heated on-air exchange between Atlanta Mayor Bill Campbell and Boortz, Campbell remarked on the Holyfield relationship: Campbell (sarcastically): "By the way, Neal, Evander Holyfield sends his regards ... We talked a little about how good he's doing now and the fact he's getting ready to open up his 57,000 square-foot, $20 million home. How he's fighting for $35 million a fight. I was sorta thinking about when you were representing him. He was living in an apartment over on Lenox Road. He was fighting for about $20,000 a fight. It's sort of interesting how your great legal skills have transferred into financial well-being for Evander . ... " Boortz responded by calling Mayor Campbell an "unethical son of a bitch." Boortz later remarked, "It's the only time I've ever been on the air that I lost control." In 1993, Boortz closed his law practice and devoted himself full-time to his radio career.

=== Full-time radio career ===
While in law school, Boortz returned to work at WRNG. In 1983 he moved to the larger news-talk radio station WGST. He later recounted how he would often go into work at his law office at 5 a.m., work there for several hours, then go to WGST, and finally back to the law office until 11:00 p.m. In 1992, Boortz asked WGST for a raise; a salary equal to his combined income as an attorney and a radio host. When WGST refused, Boortz left. He got his raise when he signed an exclusive contract with AM 750 WSB to host a weekday radio show. Shortly after that, he closed his law office. In 1995, Talkers Magazine named Boortz one of the "25 Most Important Radio Talk Show Hosts in America". That same year, Georgia Trend magazine added Boortz to its list of the "100 Most Powerful & Influential People in Georgia"

"Don't believe anything you read on [the Neal Boortz] web page or, for that matter, anything you hear on The Neal Boortz Show unless it is consistent with what you already know to be true, or unless you have taken the time to research the matter to prove its accuracy to your own satisfaction."

— Neal Boortz

In 1999, his show became nationally syndicated through WSB's owner Cox Radio. The show continued to be based in Atlanta. The Neal Boortz Show featured Boortz, producers Belinda Skelton and Royal Marshall, interviews, and callers. On the air and on his website, Boortz admonished his listeners to take no heed nor place any credence in anything he said, presenting himself as merely an "entertainer." As an entertainer, Boortz was a 2002 NAB Marconi Radio Awards finalist and Radio & Records NewsTalk Personality of the Year for 2002.

In 2007, Boortz and his radio show were awarded "Best Radio On-Air Personality" and "Best Radio Program, Any Type" by The Georgia Association of Broadcasters. He was also a recipient of the Georgia Radio Hall of Fame 2007 Career Achievement Award. The Neal Boortz Show originated from the nation's ninth largest radio market and was ranked the sixth overall most listened to radio program in the country. In 2008, Boortz was a finalist for the National Association of Broadcasters "Marconi Award" as the nation's best syndicated radio personality. (The award went to Glenn Beck).

Boortz was inducted in the National Radio Hall of Fame in 2009.

Boortz retired from full-time radio work in 2013.

=== Author ===
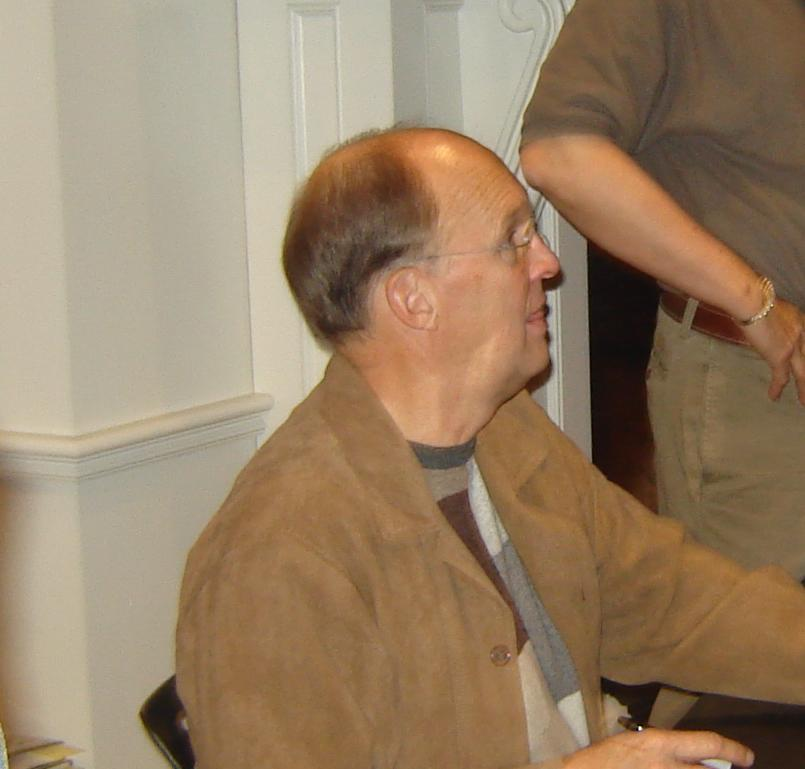
Boortz on a book tour for Somebody's Gotta Say It

Boortz's first foray into authorship was in 1997 with The Commencement Speech You Need To Hear, in which he delivers his opinions on various topics in the form of a commencement speech he would give to new college graduates, if ever invited to do so. His second book, entitled The Terrible Truth About Liberals, was published in 1998, and contains reprinted material from his first book, along with a significant amount of new material.

His third book (co-authored by Georgia Congressman John Linder) entitled The FairTax Book, explains the proposal to implement a national retail sales tax in lieu of the federal income taxes, payroll taxes, estate tax, etc. The hardcover version held the number-one nonfiction spot on The New York Times bestseller list for the last two weeks of August 2005, and remained in the top 10 for seven weeks. The paperback released in May 2006 contains additional information, an afterword, and several revisions of misstatements made in the hardcover edition. It also spent several weeks on The New York Times bestseller list. Boortz claims to have donated 100% of his royalties from the book to charity, and has commented on his radio show that he has not made one cent from the book. As of July 2006, Boortz claims his charitable donations from book proceeds exceed US$100,000.

His fourth book, Somebody's Gotta Say It, was released on February 20, 2007, and debuted at number two on The New York Times bestseller list, second only to Barack Obama's Audacity of Hope. He occasionally writes columns on the Internet news/commentary site Townhall.com and other online magazines.

His 2008 book, FairTax: The Truth, attempts to answer the critics of the Fair Tax proposal and claims to correct some of its myths and misrepresentations. It achieved number four on The New York Times bestseller list for the week of March 2, 2008, for paperback nonfiction.

After Boortz retired from talk radio on January 21, 2013, Maybe I Should Just Shut Up and Go Away! was published in hardcover by Carpenter's Son Publishing in Franklin, Tennessee.

=== Retirement ===
After Boortz retired from full-time radio work in 2013, he hosted commentaries for WSB for six more years, until they were discontinued by the station.

In January 2022, Boortz returned to radio part-time on WFOM (1230 AM, "Xtra 106.3" FM) in Atlanta, Georgia. Boortz records "The Boortz Report", a commentary that is aired several times each weekday, and appears on the station at least once a week for live segments with the local morning hosts.

== Political beliefs ==
Boortz is a self-described libertarian. He advocates a complete overhaul of the U.S. tax system and the release of all nonviolent drug offenders who are currently in prison. He has supported Republican candidates and Republican tax policy, though he occasionally clashes with Republicans on social issues. Others describe his political views as being more in line with "republitarian" philosophy that embraces incrementalism domestically, and a generally interventionist foreign policy based on self-interest, national defense, and the expansion of freedom. Boortz disagrees with the Libertarian Party platform on several key issues, including his firm support of the war in Iraq, incremental tax reform, and his opposition to the unrestricted immigration policy advocated by the Libertarian Party.

Boortz criticizes the major parties, saying, "I believe that the principal difference between the Democrats and the Republicans is that the Democrats just want to grow our Imperial Federal Government a bit faster than the Republicans do." He sides with liberals on some social issues, such as abortion, same-sex marriage, and civil liberties. He agrees with fiscal conservatives in advocating less government spending and decreasing corporate regulation. He is an advocate for freedom of speech. In line with the traditional views of the Libertarian Party, Boortz supports eliminating the war on drugs, and emphasizing personal responsibility. He has repeatedly stated his belief that global climate change is not man-made. His stances on many of these issues make him popular among conservative Republicans, who due to their larger numbers in comparison to Libertarians, make up the majority of his listeners and callers.

Boortz's post-9/11 platforms include support for the US-led war on terror, a more aggressive foreign policy, and the USA Patriot Act. He is also strongly in favor of a crackdown on illegal immigration, including harsh penalties for businesses who employ persons here illegally. These views occasionally put him in conflict with the Libertarian Party. Justin Raimondo of Antiwar.com has called Boortz a "statist, not a libertarian" and a "liberventionist", and has urged the Libertarian Party to "Boot Boortz".

Prior to the 2006 midterm elections, Boortz opined that perhaps it would be a good thing to have the Republicans lose power in Congress, forcing them to wake up and stop taking their base for granted. Boortz told one disgruntled caller:

I am happy about it [the defeat]. It's the only way to get these Republicans to wake themselves up and say, 'You have abandoned what you were put in office for.'

Boortz creates controversy among conservatives for his support of abortion rights (on which Boortz does not allow calls), for his refusal to condemn homosexuality or gay marriage, and for his negative comments regarding Baptists and the biblical story of creation. Although he calls himself a Christian, he keeps his religious views private. He has also caused a stir among some Southerners, by coining the term "Flaggots" during his frequent jabs at them and at Confederate issues (such as governmental support of the Confederate flag).

== The Neal Boortz Show ==
The Neal Boortz Show was a nationally syndicated talk show, which ended in January 2013. It aired live from 8:30 am to noon, weekdays.

Boortz marketed his talk radio show as "insensitivity training", creating controversy which increased ratings. His stated "beliefs" included a claim that ADD and ADHD are "medical frauds" and a scam that teachers, parents, and drug companies use. His attempts at controversy included referring to homeless people as "urban outdoorsmen" on air, and called public education "taxpayer-funded child abuse". Specific targets of criticism included Christian conservatives, Hillary Clinton, Ted Kennedy, Max Cleland, and Cynthia McKinney. He also expressed a negative opinion about the lack of Muslim outrage for the actions of Muslim terrorists and the riots that erupted in response to the Jyllands-Posten Muhammad cartoons controversy. Islamic extremism was a favorite topic.

Some of his remarks caused controversy. After the Virginia Tech shootings, Boortz criticized the media, saying, "When the history of this event is written, we will have 25 students standing meekly waiting for this guy to execute them." When public outrage resulted from his comments, members of the Virginia Legislature tried to have Boortz's show removed from local radio stations. In March 2008, Boortz attracted controversy by playing an audiotape of a nine-year-old where he repeatedly ridiculed the child's speech, leading to an unsuccessful FCC petition to deny Boortz's employer the right to purchase five local radio stations.

On June 4, 2012, Boortz announced that he would retire from radio by the end of the year. His last live show aired on January 18, 2013. Boortz's regular fill-in host, Herman Cain, replaced him on January 21, 2013, in what amounted to a swap of seats, as Boortz became Cain's fill-in host. Boortz hosted commentaries for WSB for six more years, until they were discontinued by station.
