= 2010 Georgia gubernatorial election =

- November 2, 2010
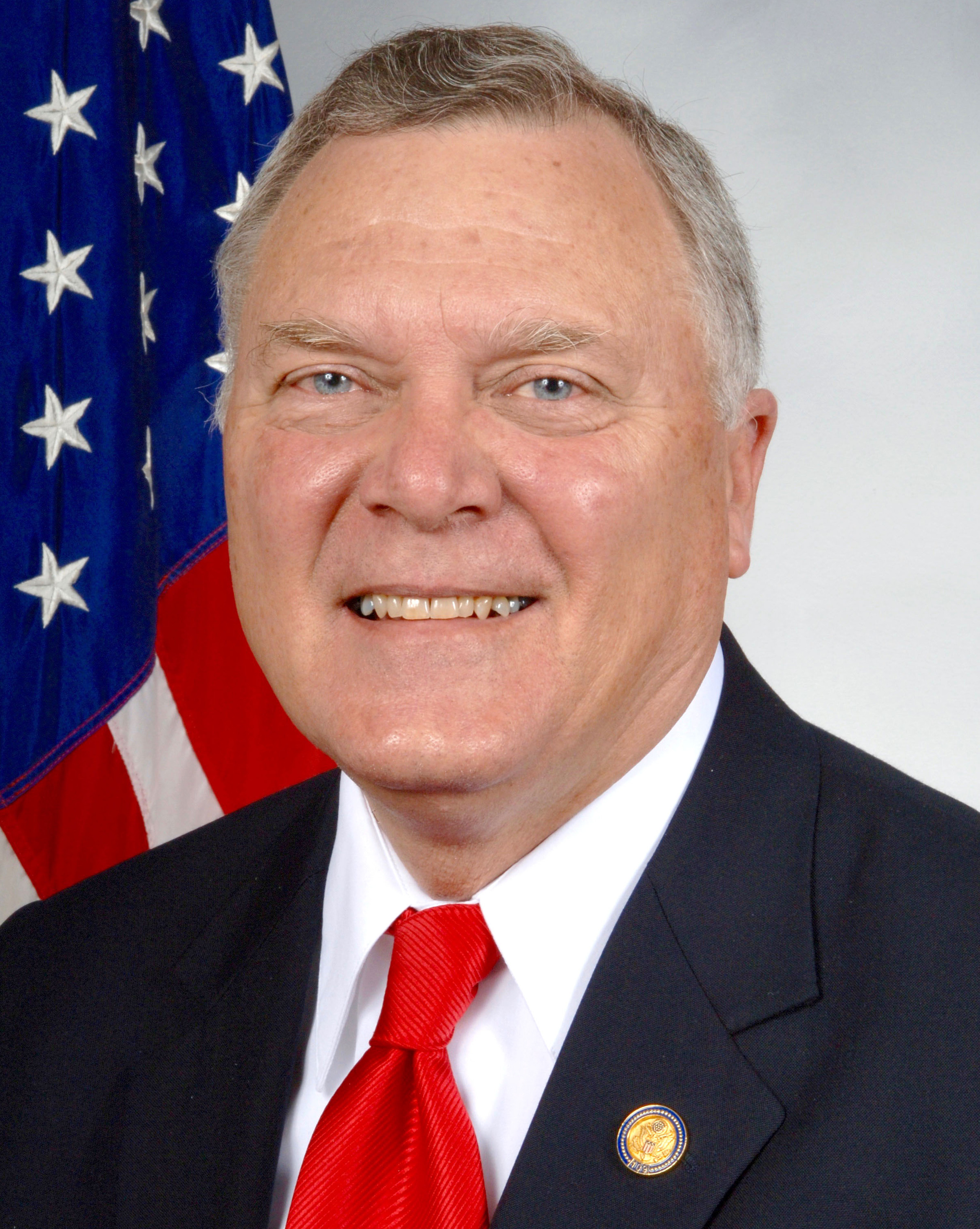

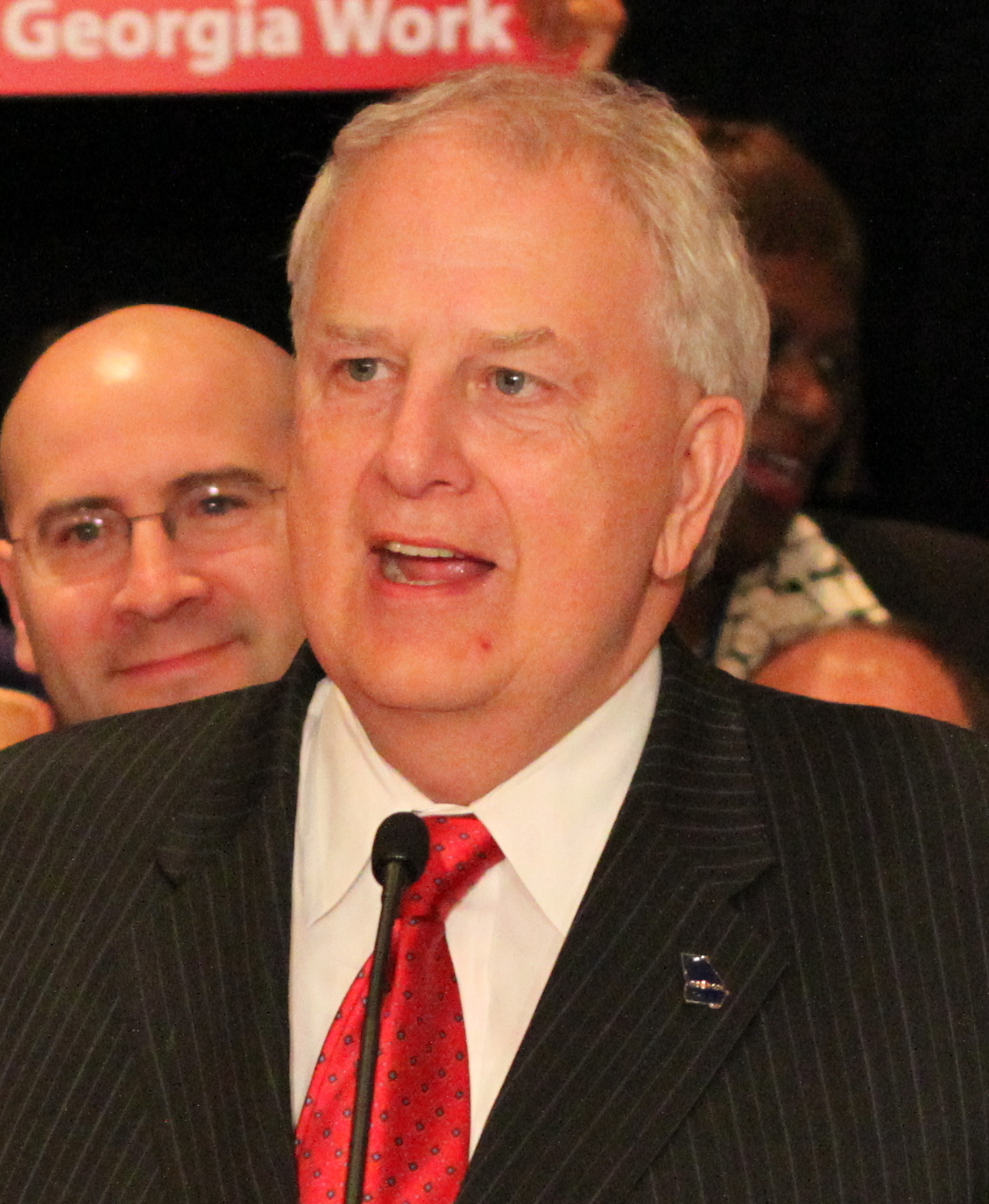
Nominee	Nathan Deal	Roy Barnes
Party	Republican	Democratic
Popular vote	1,365,832	1,107,011
Percentage	53.02%	42.97%
- Deal: 40–50% 50–60% 60–70% 70–80% 80–90% >90% Barnes: 40–50% 50–60% 60–70% 70–80% 80–90% >90% Tie: 40–50% 50% No data
Governor before election
Sonny Perdue
Republican
Elected Governor
Nathan Deal
Republican

The 2010 Georgia gubernatorial election was held on November 2, 2010. Incumbent Republican governor Sonny Perdue was term-limited and unable to seek re-election. Primary elections for the Republican and Democratic parties took place on July 20. Democrats nominated former governor Roy Barnes, and Republicans nominated Representative Nathan Deal following a runoff on August 10. The Libertarian Party also had ballot access and nominated John Monds. Deal won the general election, and took office on January 10, 2011.

As of 2024, this was the last election in which a candidate won the governorship by double digits. This is the first gubernatorial election in Georgia since 1990 in which the winner was of a different party than the incumbent president. This was the first election in which Republicans won three consecutive gubernatorial elections in the state. This was the last gubernatorial election in which Douglas, Henry, and Newton counties voted for the Republican candidate and the last in which Baker, Early, Mitchell, Clinch, Brooks, and McIntosh counties voted for the Democratic candidate.

== Republican primary ==
=== Candidates ===
==== Declared ====
- Jeff Chapman, State Senator
- Nathan Deal, U.S. representative
- Karen Handel, Secretary of State of Georgia
- Eric Johnson, former state senator
- Ray McBerry, candidate for governor in 2006
- John Oxendine, insurance commissioner
- Otis Putnam

==== Declined ====
- Johnny Isakson, incumbent U.S. senator

=== Polling ===
==== Primary ====
Poll source	Dates administered	John Oxendine	Karen Handel	Nathan Deal	Eric Johnson	Ray McBerry	Austin Scott	Jeff Chapman	Undecided
Magellan Strategies	July 18, 2010	12%	38%	20%	17%	3%	–	3%	7%
InsiderAdvantage	July 14, 2010	15%	24%	16%	13%	3%	–	6%	22%
Rasmussen Reports	July 13, 2010	20%	25%	25%	13%	–	–	–	14%
Mason-Dixon	July 8–13, 2010	31%	23%	18%	6%	2%	–	1%	19%
Magellan Strategies	July 8, 2010	18%	32%	18%	8%	3%	–	3%	14%
Survey USA	July 7–8, 2010	32%	23%	12%	12%	5%	–	4%	10%
InsiderAdvantage	July 1, 2010	18%	18%	12%	8%	3%	–	6%	34%
Survey USA	June 14–17, 2010	34%	18%	17%	6%	3%	–	4%	17%
InsiderAdvantage	April 5, 2010	26%	18%	9%	5%	–	–	–	31%
Rasmussen Reports	December 15, 2009	28%	14%	13%	2%	2%	2%	2%	32%
Rasmussen Reports	October 20, 2009	27%	12%	9%	3%	3%	3%	--	35%
Rasmussen Reports	August 18, 2009	31%	13%	13%	3%	2%	--	--	31%
Rasmussen Reports	June 17, 2009	33%	11%	10%	3%	2%	2%	--	33%
Strategic Vision	June 17, 2009	35%	13%	12%	4%	2%	2%	--	32%

==== Runoff ====
Poll source	Dates administered	Nathan Deal	Karen Handel
Landmark Communications	August 7, 2010	44%	42%
Georgia Newspapers	August 7, 2010	42%	47%
Insider Advantage	August 5, 2010	46%	46%
Landmark Communications	August 2, 2010	37%	46%
McLaughlin & Associates	July 23, 2010	39%	38%

=== Results ===
Initial primary results by county: Deal: 20–30%; 30–40%; 40–50%; 50–60%; 60–70%; Handel: 20–30%; 30–40%; 40–50%; 50–60%; 60–70%; Johnson: 20–30%; 30–40%; 40–50%; 50–60%; 60–70%; Oxendine: 20–30%; 30–40%; 40–50%; 60–70%; Chapman: 30–40%; 40–50%; McBerry: 30–40%

Runoff results by county: Deal: 50–60%; 60–70%; 70–80%; 80–90%; Handel: 50–60%; 60–70%; 70–80%; Tie: 50%

Republican primary results
Party	Candidate	Votes	%
Republican	Karen Handel	231,990	34.1
Republican	Nathan Deal	155,946	22.9
Republican	Eric Johnson	136,792	20.1
Republican	John Oxendine	115,421	17.0
Republican	Jeff Chapman	20,636	3.0
Republican	Ray McBerry	17,171	2.5
Republican	Otis Putnam	2,543	0.4
Total votes		680,499	100.0

Republican primary runoff results
Party	Candidate	Votes	%
Republican	Nathan Deal	291,035	50.2
Republican	Karen Handel	288,516	49.8
Total votes		579,551	100.0

== Democratic primary ==
=== Candidates ===
==== Declared ====
- Thurbert Baker, Attorney General of Georgia
- Roy Barnes, former governor of Georgia
- Bill Bolton
- Carl Camon
- Randal Mangham, state representative
- DuBose Porter, state representative
- David Poythress, former adjutant general of the Georgia National Guard, former commissioner of labor and candidate for governor in 1998

=== Polling ===
Poll source	Dates administered	Roy Barnes	Thurbert Baker	DuBose Porter	Carl Camon	David Poythress	Undecided
Rasmussen Reports	July 13, 2010	59%	16%	5%	--	5%	12%
Mason-Dixon	July 8–13, 2010	54%	20%	3%	--	7%	16%
Survey USA	July 7–8, 2010	56%	18%	6%	3%	5%	9%
Survey USA	June 14–17, 2010	63%	13%	4%	1%	5%	11%
InsiderAdvantage	April 7, 2010	47%	18%	5%	–	6%	24%
Rasmussen Reports	December 18, 2009	48%	17%	3%	1%	4%	19%
Rasmussen Reports	October 20, 2009	43%	19%	4%	3%	4%	21%
Rasmussen Reports	August 18, 2009	42%	9%	7%	1%	2%	30%
Rasmussen Reports	June 17, 2009	48%	8%	5%	2%	2%	31%
Strategic Vision	June 17, 2009	49%	30%	2%	-	5%	14%

=== Results ===
Primary results by county: Barnes: 30–40%; 40–50%; 50–60%; 60–70%; 70–80%; 80–90%; Porter: 50–60%; 60–70%

Democratic primary results
Party	Candidate	Votes	%
Democratic	Roy Barnes	259,482	65.6
Democratic	Thurbert Baker	85,571	21.6
Democratic	David Poythress	21,780	5.5
Democratic	DuBose Porter	17,767	4.5
Democratic	Carl Camon	4,170	1.1
Democratic	Bill Bolton	3,573	0.9
Democratic	Randal Mangham	3,124	0.8
Total votes		395,497	100.0

== Third party and independent candidates ==
=== Independent ===
- Neal Horsley

=== Libertarian Party ===
- John Monds, president of the Grady County NAACP

=== Write-in ===
- Samuel M. "Sam" Hay, III
- Jacob Perasso (Socialist Workers Party)

== General election ==
=== Predictions ===
Source	Ranking	As of
Cook Political Report	Tossup	October 14, 2010
Rothenberg	Lean R	October 28, 2010
RealClearPolitics	Lean R	November 1, 2010
Sabato's Crystal Ball	Lean R	October 28, 2010
CQ Politics	Lean R	October 28, 2010

=== Polling ===
Poll source	Dates administered	Nathan Deal (R)	Roy Barnes (D)	John Monds (L)	Other	Undecided
Rasmussen Reports	October 24, 2010	49%	39%	5%	5%	1%
Insider Advantage	Unavailable	49%	41%	3%	--	7%
Rasmussen Reports	October 6, 2010	50%	41%	3%	3%	3%
Insider Advantage	September 27, 2010	45%	37%	5%	--	13%
Rasmussen Reports	September 21, 2010	45%	39%	5%	6%	5%
Insider Advantage	September 16, 2010	42%	42%	5%	--	11%
Survey USA	September 10–12, 2010	49%	38%	9%	--	4%
Insider Advantage	August 17, 2010	45%	41%	5%	--	9%
Rasmussen Reports	August 11, 2010	51%	42%	--	3%	3%
Rasmussen Reports	July 21, 2010	49%	43%	--	4%	4%
Rasmussen Reports	May 20, 2010	47%	40%	--	6%	7%
Rasmussen Reports	April 22, 2010	46%	39%	--	7%	8%
Rasmussen Reports	March 17, 2010	43%	41%	--	5%	13%
Public Policy Polling	February 26–28, 2010	38%	43%	--	--	19%
Rasmussen Reports	February 18, 2010	43%	37%	--	--	--
Rasmussen Reports	January 20, 2010	42%	43%	--	--	--

=== Results ===
2010 Georgia gubernatorial election
Party	Candidate	Votes	%	±%
Republican	Nathan Deal	1,365,832	53.02%	−4.93%
Democratic	Roy Barnes	1,107,011	42.97%	+4.75%
Libertarian	John Monds	103,194	4.01%	+0.17%
Write-in		124	0.00%	N/A
Total votes		2,576,161	100.00%	N/A
Republican hold				

==== Counties that flipped from Republican to Democratic ====
- Early (largest city: Blakely)
- McIntosh (largest municipality: Darien)
- Peach (largest municipality: Fort Valley)
- Brooks (largest city: Quitman)
- Burke (largest municipality: Waynesboro)
- Chatham (largest city: Savannah)
- Washington (largest municipality: Sandersville)
- Sumter (largest city: Americus)
- Jefferson (largest city: Louisville)
- Muscogee (largest city: Columbus)
- Rockdale (largest town: Conyers)

== See also ==
- 2010 United States gubernatorial elections
