= Georgia's 94th House of Representatives district =

State district in Georgia, USA

Georgia's 94th State House of Representatives district
Representative
Venola Mason; D
- Demographics: 19.0% White; 69.8% Black; 5.1% Hispanic; 3.7% Asian
- Population: 54,318

District 94 elects one member of the Georgia House of Representatives. It contains parts of DeKalb County and Gwinnett County.

== Members ==
- Randal Mangham (2001–2009)
- Dar'shun Kendrick (2011–2013)
- Karen Bennett (2013-2025)
- Venola Mason (since 2026)
