= Randal Mangham =

American politician

Member of the Georgia State Senate from the 55th district
- Incumbent
- Assumed office January 13, 2025
- Preceded by: Gloria Butler

Member of the Georgia State House of Representatives from the 94th district
- In office 2001–2009

Personal details
- Party: Democratic
- Website: https://manghamforsenate.com/

Randal Alonzo Mangham is an American politician who was elected member of the Georgia State Senate for the 55th district in 2024. Mangham is the principal of the law firm Randal Alonzo Mangham LLC. Mangham previously represented District 94 in the Georgia House of Representatives between 2001 and 2009, before running in the 2010 Georgia gubernatorial election.
