= Dar'shun Kendrick =

American politician (born 1982)

Dar'shun N. Kendrick
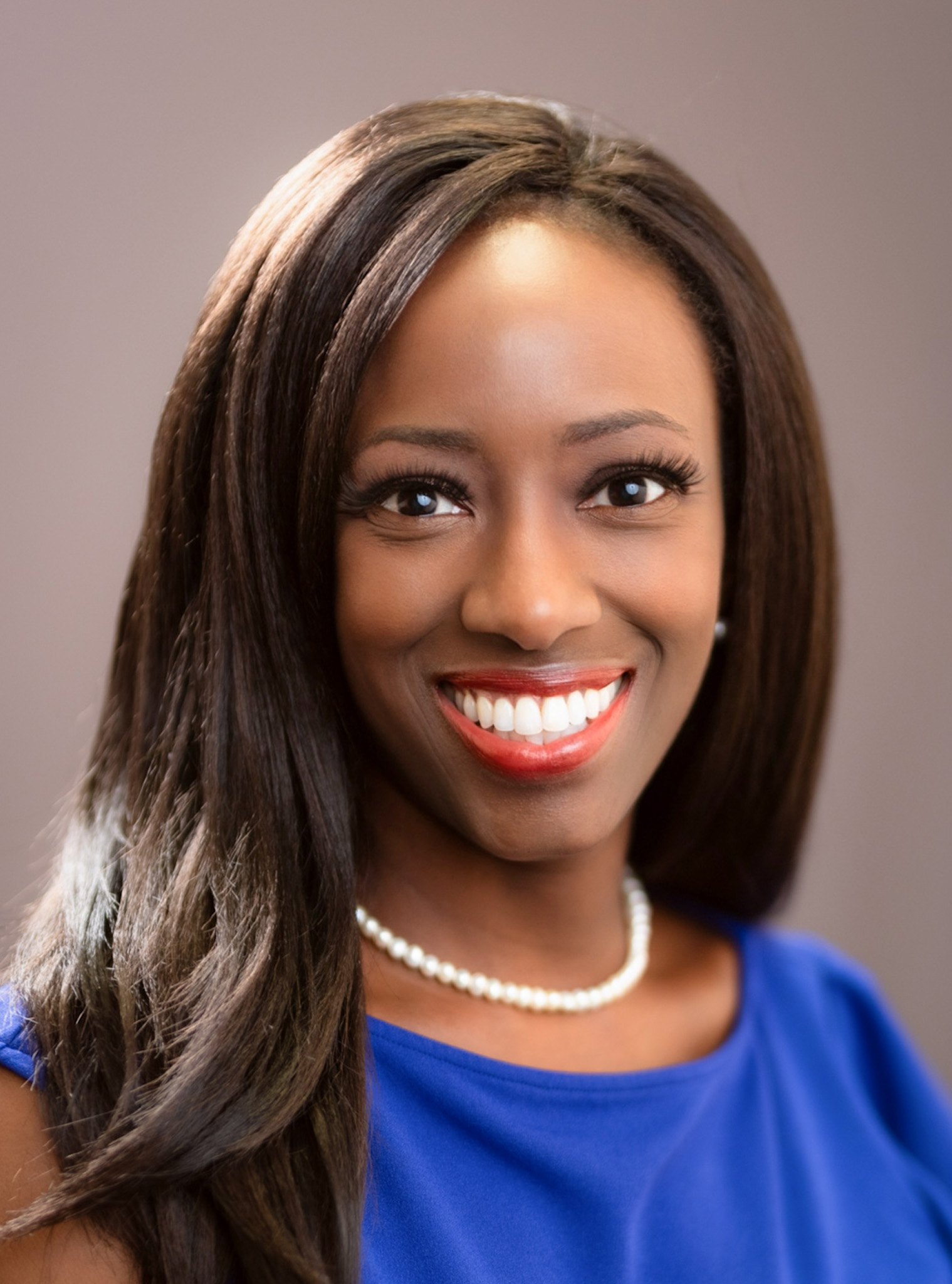
- Official portrait, 2023

Member of the Georgia House of Representatives
- Incumbent
- Assumed office January 10, 2011
- Preceded by: Randal Mangham
- Constituency: 94th district (2011–2013); 93rd district (2013–2023); 95th district (2023–present)

Personal details
- Born: August 28, 1982 (age 44) Atlanta, Georgia, U.S.
- Party: Democratic
- Education: Oglethorpe University (B.A.); University of Georgia (J.D.); Kennesaw State University (M.B.A.)
- Profession: Attorney
- Website: Kendrick for Georgia

Dar'shun Nicole Kendrick (born August 28, 1982 in Atlanta, Georgia) is an American attorney and a member of the Georgia House of Representatives, representing the 95th district; she previously represented the 94th and 93rd districts. She is a member of the Democratic Party.

== Personal life and education ==
Kendrick was born in Atlanta, Georgia, to lifelong DeKalb County, Georgia residents, Daisy and Ricky Kendrick. She graduated from Towers High School in Decatur, Georgia in 2000, and graduated cum laude from Oglethorpe University in 2004. She double-majored in political science and communications, and served as student body president her senior year. In 2007, Kendrick graduated from the University of Georgia School of Law. Kendrick earned an MBA from Kennesaw State University in 2011.

Kendrick interned for Congresswomen Cynthia McKinney and Denise Majette, as well as State Representative George Maddox. She is a member of Alpha Kappa Alpha sorority.

== Career ==
Kendrick is a member of the Interstate Cooperation, Judiciary Non-Civil, Juvenile Justice, and Small Business Development committees.

Kendrick also runs Kendrick Law Practice in Lithonia, Georgia and has a non-profit, Minority Access to Capital, Inc. In 2017, she started Kendrick Advisory and Advocacy Group, LLC, dedicated to advisory and advocacy services in the area of economic justice.

== Controversy ==
In February 2015, Kendrick posted a Facebook message stating "...I'm going to slap Stacey Dash if I see her...that wasn't nice. Forgive me God. I'm going to pray she stops talking..ok. that's better." After Dash replied to Kendrick, telling her she was "Such a role model for young black women," there were allegations Kendrick deleted the message which turned out to be false.

In March 2019, Kendrick introduced a bill that would, among other things, require Georgia men who wanted to obtain a prescription for Viagra to first obtain permission from their significant other, ban vasectomies in Georgia, and classify unprotected sex as aggravated assault. Kendrick acknowledged the bill has little chance of passing the Georgia House of Representatives, but stated that she introduced it to highlight what she considers the absurdity of HB 481, a bill passed by the Georgia State legislature in 2019 that, among other things, significantly limited the time frame and circumstances under which a woman could legally obtain an abortion in the state. Kendrick stated that she introduced her bill to "bring awareness to the fact that if you’re going to legislate our bodies, then we have every right to propose legislation to regulate yours.” In July 2020, before any part of the bill came into effect, a federal court struck down HB 481 as unconstitutional.

In October 2020, Kendrick faced ridicule after she appeared to confuse a remark made by President Trump during a presidential debate regarding “coyotes”. While the president was referring to the colloquial term for human traffickers, Kendrick seemingly confused the term with the animal, stating on Twitter, "How the hell does a coyote bring a whole human across the border?".
