= Iliad House =

US radio program

- Genre: Radio drama
- Running time: Under 30 minutes per episode
- Country of origin: United States
- Language: English
- Starring: Katie Leigh; Phil Lollar; Tracy Van Dolder; Daniel Noa; Ian Anthony Reid; Daniel Heffington; Joel Grewe
- Announcer: Tami Romani
- Created by: Phil Lollar
- Written by: Phil Lollar
- Narrated by: Phil Lollar
- No. of series: 1
- No. of episodes: 6
- Website: IliadHouse.com

Iliad House is an American radio drama series created and produced by Phil Lollar. It has been founded through a Kickstarter crowdfunding campaign, which sought to raise $100,000 in 30 days for a pilot and a full 12-episode season.

== Plot ==
Fourteen-year-old orphan Jesse Davidson lives with his emotionally distant and peculiar uncle Christopher Portalis in the Iliad House, a mysterious old mansion on an island off the east coast of the United States. Just when Jesse is finally getting used to living on the island, he discovers that the old abandoned train he and his friends have been using as a clubhouse for the past year can actually move through time.

They get caught up in a series of adventures fraught with temporal distortions, political intrigue, secret societies, and supernatural battles, all as they try to cope with the daily pressures and craziness of adolescence. While traveling through the future and the past, they learn hard truths and secrets about themselves, and that there is forgiveness and redemption available to all who desire it. And, as Jesse and his uncle come to understand each other, Jesse begins to see that there is much more to Iliad House, and to why he and his uncle are there, than anyone realizes.

== Episodes ==
- 1. First Impressions
- 2. Time Train
- 3. Visions of Reality
- 4. Blood Money
- 5. Open War
- 6. The Clearing

== Reception ==
Roma Downey, an Irish filmmaker and executive producer of The Bible miniseries, endorsed Iliad House and its crowdfunding campaign. She said that Lollar "tells exciting adventure stories, filled with wonder and awe, that are fun and funny, and that present biblical values in a way that our older kids can enjoy."

== See also ==
- Adventures in Odyssey, co-created by Lollar.
