= The Terrible Truth About Liberals =

1998 book by Neal Boortz

- First edition
- Author: Neal Boortz
- Language: English
- Genre: Non-fiction, politics
- Publisher: Taylor Trade Publishing
- Publication date: 1998
- Publication place: United States
- ISBN: 1-56352-685-9

The Terrible Truth About Liberals is a 1998 political book by conservative radio host Neal Boortz. The book is a revised edition of his previous work, The Commencement Speech You Need to Hear (1997), which enjoyed brisk sales in Atlanta, Georgia, where Boortz had been heard on his AM 750 WSB radio show. The book contains the text of one his more popular radio presentations: a notional commencement speech. He did not actually address a commencement audience, but his hypothetical speech drew examples from the presidency of Bill Clinton, criticizing American social liberalism, and praising various conservative planks such as gun rights and libertarianism.

== Overview ==
Author and libertarian radio talk show host Neal Boortz questions the true definitions of American democracy and gives his insights into current social and political issues, claiming that liberals are the cause of many problems in the United States.
