= Georgia's 95th House of Representatives district =

American legislative district

Georgia's 95th State House of Representatives district
Representative
| Dar'shun Kendrick; D–Lithonia |
- Demographics: 50.5% White; 23.3% Black; 11.8% Hispanic; 11.8% Asian
- Population (2015): 57,670

Georgia's 95th House of Representatives district elects one member of the Georgia House of Representatives. Its current representative is Democrat Dar'shun Kendrick who was first elected in the 2022 general elections.

House District 95 was last approved on August 23, 2011, when the Georgia State Legislature approved amended House district lines following the 2010 U.S. census. It was not one of the State House districts that was further amended by House Bill 829 on February 23, 2012.

== State representatives ==
| Representative | Party | Years of service | Hometown | Notes |
|---|---|---|---|---|
| Rodney Cook | Republican | 1968–1972 | Atlanta | |
| Tom Rice | Republican | 1997–2017 | Peachtree Corners | The district was renumbered to the 95th in 2011 redistricting. Tom Rice instead represented the 79th District from 1997 to 2001, followed by the 64th District from 2001 to 2003, followed by the 51st District from 2003 to 2011. |
| Scott Hilton | Republican | 2017–2019 | Peachtree Corners | |
| Beth Moore | Democrat | 2019–2023 | Peachtree Corners | |
| Dar'shun Kendrick | Democrat | 2019–present | Lithonia | |

== Recent election results ==
=== 2012 ===
Georgia's 95th State House District General Election (2012)
| Party | Candidate | Votes | % |
|---|---|---|---|
| Republican | Tom Rice* | 12,874 | 59.2 |
| Democratic | Brooke Siskin | 8,884 | 40.8 |
| Total votes | | 21,758 | 100.00 |
| Republican hold | | | |

=== 2014 ===
Georgia's 95th State House District General Election (2014)
| Party | Candidate | Votes | % |
|---|---|---|---|
| Republican | Tom Rice* | 9,619 | 62.3 |
| Democratic | Amreeta Regmi | 5,819 | 37.7 |
| Total votes | | 15,438 | 100.00 |
| Republican hold | | | |

=== 2016 ===
Georgia's 95th State House District Republican Primary (2016)
| Party | Candidate | Votes | % |
|---|---|---|---|
| Republican | Scott Hilton | 2,300 | 70.97 |
| Republican | Jay Lowe | 941 | 29.03 |
| Total votes | | 3,241 | 100.0 |

Georgia's 95th State House District General Election (2016)
| Party | Candidate | Votes | % |
|---|---|---|---|
| Republican | Scott Hilton | 18,293 | 100.00 |
| Total votes | | 18,293 | 100.00 |
| Republican hold | | | |

=== 2018 ===
Georgia's 95th State House District General Election (2018)
| Party | Candidate | Votes | % |
|---|---|---|---|
| Democratic | Beth Moore | 12,101 | 51.4 |
| Republican | Scott Hilton* | 11,442 | 48.6 |
| Total votes | | 23,543 | 100.00 |
| Democratic gain from Republican | | | |
