= Harry Geisinger =

American politician

Member of Georgia House of Representatives from the 48th District
- In office 1969–1975
- In office 2005–2015
- Preceded by: District created
- Succeeded by: Betty Price

Personal details
- Born: Harry Clifford Geisinger; October 31, 1933
- Died: May 1, 2015 (aged 81)
- Party: Republican

Military service
- Allegiance: United States
- Branch/service: United States Navy
- Years of service: 1953-1957
- Rank: Quartermaster

Harry Clifford Geisinger (October 31, 1933 – May 1, 2015) was an American politician, who served two separate stints in the Georgia House of Representatives.

Born in Cincinnati, Ohio, Geisinger grew up in Chicago, Illinois, He served in the United States Navy as quartermaster during the Korean War. Geisinger then received his bachelor's degree in business from the University of Cincinnati. He lived in Roswell, Georgia and was a consultant and the owner of an advertising agency. Geisinger served in the Georgia House of Representatives from 1969 to 1975 and then from 2005 until his death while still in office. Geisinger was a Republican.
