= Betty Price (politician) =

American politician and physician (born 1952)

Member of the Georgia House of Representatives from the 48th district
- In office July 20, 2015 – January 14, 2019
- Preceded by: Harry Geisinger
- Succeeded by: Mary Robichaux

Personal details
- Born: August 15, 1952 (age 74)
- Party: Republican
- Spouse: Tom Price (m. 1983)
- Children: 1
- Education: Pomona College (BA); McGill University (MD)

Betty Price (born August 15, 1952) is an American politician and physician. A member of the Republican Party, she previously served in the Georgia House of Representatives as the member for the 48th district. She lost her seat to Democrat Mary Robichaux on November 6, 2018.

Price was elected to the city council for Roswell, Georgia, to finish an unexpired term in 2009. She successfully ran for reelection in 2011. When State Representative Harry Geisinger died in office in 2015, Price ran in a special election to succeed him. She won the election, held on July 14, 2015.

Price graduated from Cocoa Beach High School in Cocoa Beach, Florida then earned her Bachelor of Arts from Pomona College and her Doctor of Medicine from McGill University She worked as an anesthesiologist. Her husband is former Secretary of Health and Human Services and U.S. Representative Tom Price.

In October 2017, Price was strongly criticized for "suggesting that people with HIV might be quarantined to curb the spread of the infectious disease."
