= Mary Robichaux =

American politician (born 1955)

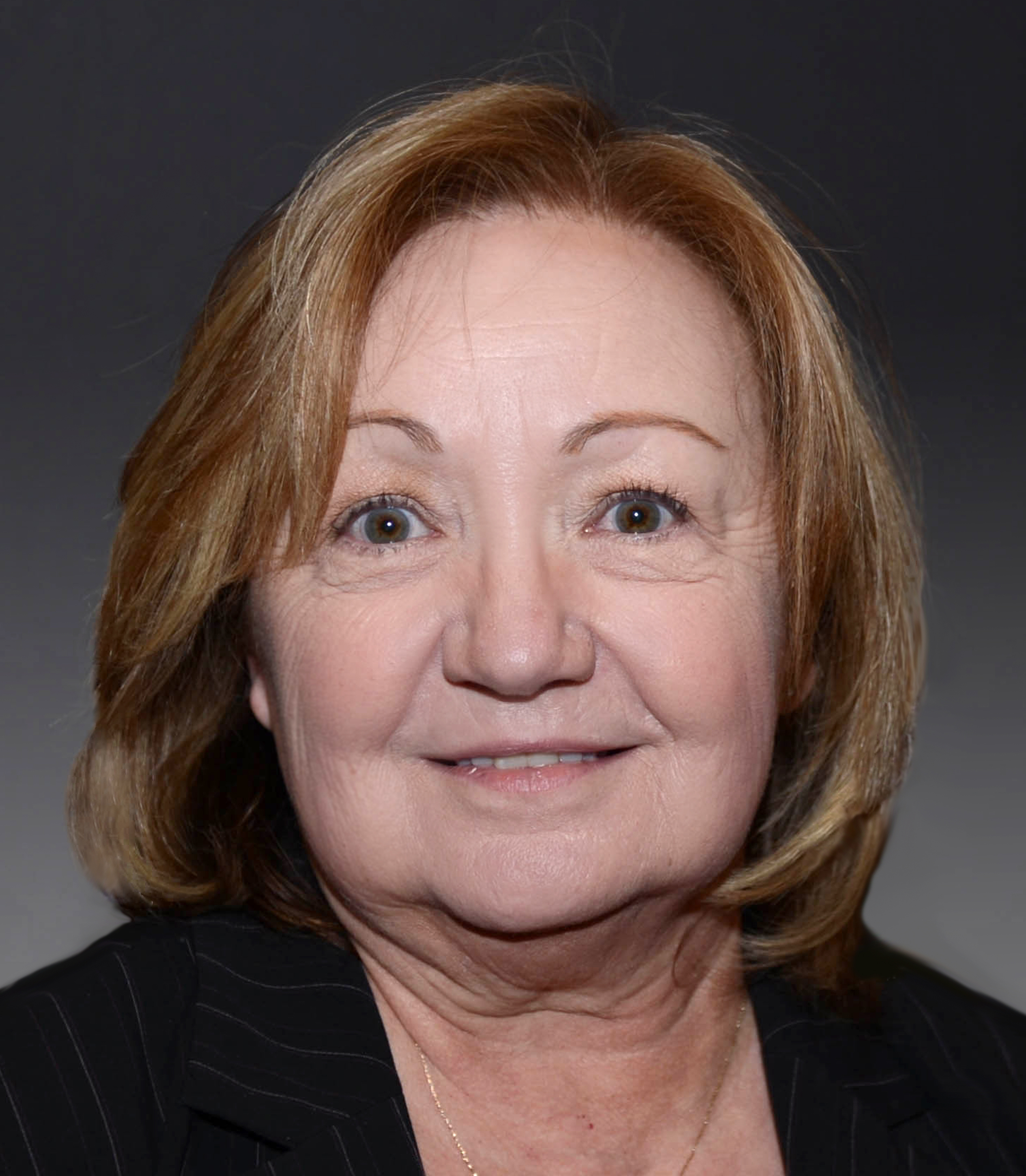

Mayor of Roswell
- Assuming office January 2026
- Succeeding: Kurt Wilson

Member of the Georgia House of Representatives
- In office January 14, 2019 – January 9, 2023
- Preceded by: Betty Price
- Succeeded by: Scott Hilton
- Constituency: 48th district

Personal details
- Born: August 24, 1955 (age 71) Louisiana
- Party: Democratic
- Spouse: Rory
- Children: Two
- Education: University of New Orleans; Louisiana State University Medical Center
- Occupation: Healthcare Consultant

Mary C. Robichaux (born August 24, 1955) is an American politician who has served since 2026 as mayor of Roswell, Georgia. A Democrat, she represented District 48 in the Georgia House of Representatives from January 14, 2019, until January 9, 2023.

== Political career ==
In 2018, Robichaux ran for election to represent District 48 in the Georgia House of Representatives. She defeated Republican incumbent Betty Price with 50.3% of the vote.

As of July 2020, Robichaux was on the following committees:

- Human Relations & Aging
- Small Business Development
- Special Rules

She ran for reelection in 2020 and defeated Republican Betty Price with 52.3% of the vote.

On November 8, 2022, she lost re-election to District 48 to Scott Hilton, a Republican.

She defeated incumbent Republican Kurt Wilson to become mayor in 2025.

=== Electoral record ===
2018 general election: Georgia House of Representatives, District 48
Party	Candidate	Votes	%
Democratic	Mary Robichaux	11,102	50.3%
Republican	Betty Price	10,952	49.7%

2020 general election: Georgia House of Representatives, District 48
Party	Candidate	Votes	%
Democratic	Mary Robichaux	14,635	52.3%
Republican	Betty Price	13,349	47.7%

2022 general election: Georgia House of Representatives, District 48
Party	Candidate	Votes	%
Democratic	Mary Robichaux	12,223	45.7%
Republican	Scott Hilton	14,531	54.3%

== Personal life ==
Robichaux grew up in rural Louisiana and graduated from the University of New Orleans and Louisiana State University Medical Center. Her career has included working for the American Heart Association, Emory Healthcare, and Johns Hopkins Hospital. She has lived in Roswell, Georgia, since 1993, and she and her husband, Rory, have two children.
