= Georgia's 48th House of Representatives district =

State district in Georgia, USA

Georgia's 48th State House of Representatives district
Representative
Scott Hilton; R–Peachtree Corners
- Demographics: 58.0% White; 16.2% Black; 19.3% Hispanic; 4.1% Asian
- Population: 57,617

District 48 elects one member of the Georgia House of Representatives. It contains parts of Gwinnett County and Fulton County.

== Members ==
- Harry Geisinger (1969–1975)
- Harry Geisinger (2005–2015)
- Betty Price (2015–2019)
- Mary Robichaux (2019–2023)
- Scott Hilton (since 2023)
