= Miles Corwin =

American author and journalist

- Born: Los Angeles, California, U.S.
- Occupations: Novelist; journalist

Academic work
- Institutions: University of California, Irvine

Miles Corwin is a Los Angeles-based author and journalist who specializes in crime and the criminal justice system. Corwin is a recipient of the PEN Center USA Award for Creative Nonfiction for his book And Still We Rise. He is a professor in the Literary Journalism Program in the English Department at the University of California, Irvine.

== Career ==
Corwin is the author of three nonfiction books and three novels. For The Killing Season (Simon & Schuster, 1997 Corwin spent seven months in South Los Angeles with homicide detectives from the Los Angeles Police Department to document the lives of officers, killers, victims, and their families.

In And Still We Rise (William Morrow, 2000), Corwin spent a year with academically gifted seniors at an inner city high school in Los Angeles.

Corwin's Homicide Special (Henry Holt, 2003) documents six complex police investigations, including the murders of actor Robert Blake’s second wife and of a friend of Robert Durst, a real estate heir, who was convicted of the homicide twenty years later.

His novels Kind of Blue (Oceanview Publishing, 2010), and Midnight Alley (Oceanview Publishing, 2012) feature LAPD homicide detective Ash Levine.

In 2015 Corwin published L.A. Nocturne (Calman-Levy), set in 1946 Los Angeles, in which LAPD homicide detective Jacob Silver tries to solve a high profile murder.

Corwin spent twenty years as a staff writer for the Los Angeles Times. A column that Corwin wrote served as the basis for President Barack Obama’s speech at his signing of the repeal of the U.S. military’s “Don’t ask, don’t tell” policy that required gay service members to keep their sexual orientation secret or face discharge. The column told the story of the rescue of Corwin's father, Lloyd, by a gay soldier during World War II's Battle of the Bulge.

While at the Los Angeles Times, Corwin contributed to the newspaper's Pulitzer-prize winning coverage of the 1992 Los Angeles riots and the 1994 Northridge earthquake.

== Education ==
Corwin received an undergraduate degree in English from the University of California, Santa Barbara. He received a master's degree from the University of Missouri School of Journalism.
