= Phil Lollar =

American actor

- Born: August 6, 1959 (age 66); Klamath Falls, Oregon, U.S.
- Years active: 1985–present
- Spouse: Leslie Lollar
- Children: 1

Phil Lollar (born August 6, 1959) is an American voice actor, director, producer, and writer for the Focus on the Family radio/audio drama Adventures in Odyssey. He is one of the show's creators, and provided the voice for several characters on the show, including Odyssey Times editor Dale Jacobs. He was also a writer/ director/ producer/ voice actor for Jungle Jam and Friends: The Radio Show!, the Little Dogs on the Prairie videos, Roma Donny’s Little Angels videos, and co-created Big Idea's 3-2-1 Penguins! series. He was script supervisor for Paws & Tales and released his own series, Iliad House, in 2016.

== Career ==
Phil started his performing career at the age of five. He won numerous acting awards in high school, and studied music, screenwriting, and directing in college. Phil then worked with Focus on the Family, co-creating the Adventures in Odyssey series, and writing more than 250 episodes and directing almost 400. Phil also co-developed the hit comedy series Jungle Jam and Friends: The Radio Show! as well as the animated video series Little Dogs on the Prairie. Phil also served as a writer and consultant for the Emmy nominated television series, The Wubbulous World of Dr. Seuss. He also voiced Mr. Small, Mr. Strong, and Mr. Lazy on the US version of The Mr. Men Show, as well as serving as the show’s casting director.

== Personal life ==
Lollar lives in Arizona with his wife Leslie. They have one son.

== Written works of Phil Lollar ==
This is a list of books or other written works by Phil Lollar.

- Adventures in Odyssey – (with Paul McCusker), Lillenas Pub Co, ISBN 0-8341-9694-8
- Adventures in Odyssey Radio Scripts (with Paul McCusker), Lillenas Pub Co, ISBN 0-8341-9839-8
- At the Cross: Dramatic Resources for the Easter Season – ISBN 3-01-001248-9
- The Complete Guide to Adventures in Odyssey – Tyndale House Pub, ISBN 1-56179-466-X
- The Great Train Set Robbery – Thomas Nelson Inc, ISBN 0-8499-7649-9
- Little Dogs on the Prairie: Yippee Ti-Yay, Happy Birthday Book, STL, ISBN 0-8499-7648-0
- Welcome to Odyssey – Hardcover, Tyndale House, ISBN 1-56179-104-0

=== The Blackgaard Chronicles book series ===
Authored by Phil Lollar

- 1: Opening Moves (Now available!)
- 2: Pawn's Play (Now available!)
- 3: Cross-Check (Now available!)
- 4: Rook's Ruse (Now available!)
- 5: Knight's Scheme (Now available!)
- 6: Bishop's Block (Now available!)
- 7: Scotch Game (Coming October 1, 2026)

(available only in hardback featuring deckle pages) Note: Eight books were planned for the series.

=== Young Whit book series ===
Authored by Phil Lollar & Dave Arnold

- 1: Young Whit and the Traitor's Treasure
- 2: Young Whit and the Shroud of Secrecy
- 3: Young Whit and the Thieves of Barrymore
- 4: Young Whit and the Phantasmic Confabulator
- 5: Young Whit and the Cloth of Contention

(available only in hardback)

== Voice work ==
- The Mr. Men Show: Mr. Small (US), Mr. Lazy (US) and Mr. Strong (US)
- Hi Hi Puffy AmiYumi: Wacky Wally, Additional voices
- Space Racers: Dodo, Headmaster Crane
- Adventures in Odyssey: Additional voices
- Olivia: Additional voices
- Little Dogs on the Prairie: Additional voices
- Jungle Jam and Friends: The Radio Show!: Millard J. Monkey & others

== Casting Director ==
- The Mr. Men Show
- Hi Hi Puffy AmiYumi

== Voice Director ==
- Olivia
- Hi Hi Puffy AmiYumi
- Adventures in Odyssey
- Iliad House
- The Little Angels
