= Distribution of the FairTax burden =

The Fair Tax Act (H.R. 25/S. 18) is a bill in the United States Congress for changing tax laws to replace the Internal Revenue Service (IRS) and all federal income taxes (including Alternative Minimum Tax), payroll taxes (including Social Security and Medicare taxes), corporate taxes, capital gains taxes, gift taxes, and estate taxes with a national retail sales tax, to be levied once at the point of purchase on all new goods and services. The proposal also calls for a monthly payment to households of citizens and legal resident aliens (based on family size) as an advance rebate of tax on purchases up to the poverty level. The impact of the FairTax on the distribution of the tax burden is a point of dispute. The plan's supporters argue that it would decrease tax burdens, broaden the tax base, be progressive, increase purchasing power, and tax wealth, while opponents argue that a national sales tax would be inherently regressive and would decrease tax burdens paid by high-income individuals.

== Tax rate and rebate ==
The FairTax legislation would apply a 23% federal retail sales tax on the total transaction value of new retail goods and services purchases; in other words, consumers pay to the government 23 cents of every dollar spent (sometimes called tax-inclusive — as income taxes are calculated). The assessed tax rate is 30% if the FairTax is added to the pre-tax price of a good like traditional U.S. sales taxes (sometimes called tax-exclusive). The effective tax rate for any household would be variable due to the fixed monthly tax rebates. The rebates would have the greatest impact at low spending levels, where they could lower a household's effective rate to zero or a negative rate. At higher spending levels, the rebate has less impact, and a household's effective tax rate would approach 23% of total spending. For example, a household of three spending $30,000 a year on taxable items would devote about 6% of total spending to the FairTax after the rebate. A household spending $125,000 on taxable items would spend around 19% on the FairTax. The rebate would be paid in twelve monthly installments equal to 23% of poverty level spending for each household size and is meant to eliminate the taxation of necessities and make the plan progressive. Economist Bruce Bartlett stated that if Americans perceive the monthly FairTax rebate as additional income, instead of a return on taxes paid, the tax rate could be viewed as proportional. Laurence Kotlikoff, Boston University economist, stated that Bartlett's assessment was flawed psychology or political science, and not based on economics or perceptions under the current tax system.

== Tax burden impact ==
In a Congressional committee hearing, Congressman John Linder stated that "the President's Advisory Panel for Federal Tax Reform, with the help of the United States Treasury Department, concluded that the FairTax is the only reform proposal that completely untaxes the poor." However, that bipartisan panel's final report to the President rejected a National Sales Tax. The panel's evaluated hybrid plan (similar to the Citizens for an Alternative Tax System sales tax plan) differs from the FairTax legislation in several areas with the Chairman of the Panel, former U.S. Senator Connie Mack, stating that "the panel did not score H.R. 25” (the FairTax). The panel was not allowed to consider reforming regressive payroll taxes and they reduced the tax base by adding large exclusions. However, the Panel reported that with an individual and corporate income tax replacement (excluding other taxes) and rebate system, the overall tax burden on middle-income Americans would increase while the tax burden on the very rich would drop. According to the report, the percent of federal taxes paid by those earning from $15–$50,000 would rise from 3.6% to 6.7%, while the burden on those earning more than $200,000 would fall from 53.5% to 45.9%. The report states, "Families with the top 10 percent of cash incomes would benefit substantially from the retail sales tax. Their tax burden would fall by 5.3 percentage points – from 70.8 percent to 65.5 percent. Middle-income Americans, however, would bear more of the federal tax burden. A typical married couple at the bottom 25th percentile of the income distribution earns $39,300 per year and would pay $5,625 in federal taxes in 2006. Under the retail sales tax with a Prebate, the same family would pay $7,997 in net federal taxes after the Prebate of $6,694, resulting in a tax increase of $2,372, or 42 percent."' Americans For Fair Taxation state that the Tax Panel's rate and tax burden analysis is not an estimate of the FairTax legislation. FairTax supporters argue that replacing the regressive payroll tax (not included in the Tax Panel study) greatly changes the tax distribution and that the FairTax would relieve the tax burden on middle-class workers. The Tax Panel also did not consider the embedded tax cost associated with corporate income taxes that affect the personal tax burden under current law (see Supporting theories of effect). Proponents charge that the Presidential Tax Panel was motivated to maintain the "status quo" and thus modify the tax base from the proposed legislation to achieve higher rates. The Beacon Hill Institute and Laurence Kotlikoff, have criticized the President's Advisory Panel's study as having altered the terms of the FairTax and using unsound methodology. The Treasury Department has refused to make public for peer-review detailed figures and scoring methodology used in their analysis.

FairTax supporters argue that the tax burden would shift to those who do not pay taxes under the current system and those with wealth. The FairTax would dramatically broaden the tax base to include all 300 million Americans and an estimated 30 million to 40 million foreign tourists and visitors. In a study on tax base and rate, the Beacon Hill Institute concluded that the FairTax would offer the broadest tax base and increase the federal government's net base to $9.355 trillion from $7.033 trillion of taxable income, which allows the FairTax to have a lower tax rate than current tax law. Proponents argue that if the rate appears too high, it brings to light the true cost of the federal government and the hidden taxes Congress has imposed on the American taxpayer. A study by Kotlikoff on marginal and average tax rates found that the FairTax would reduce most households’ average lifetime tax rates, although the study assumed an 18.3% cut in non-Social Security federal expenditure Economists at Boston University found that if their estimates of increased economic growth were correct the FairTax would reward low-income households with 26.3% more purchasing power, middle-income households with 12.4% more purchasing power, and high-income households with 5% more purchasing power.

Dr. Carl Milsted, senior editor of the Free Liberal, suggested that the FairTax would be a significant tax break for high-net-worth individuals, so it should be combined with a wealth tax. He claims that such a system would allow a lower tax rate on consumption, while maintaining current levels of taxation on high-net-worth individuals. Randall Burns, the Economics Moderator of the Kucinich Volunteer Forum, had previously suggested that fairtax could be paired with an asset tax that could be adjusted to assure that asset distribution after the switch to Fairtax wouldn't be more concentrated than under the existing system. Economist Laurence Kotlikoff of Boston University states that the FairTax would be a tax on wealth, unlike the current system that taxes income. The Beacon Hill Institute at Suffolk University concluded in a 2007 study on distributional effects that "the FairTax benefits households and individuals in the lower expenditure categories, while imposing a higher burden on those in the higher expenditure brackets" and that it "would benefit the average individual in almost all expenditures deciles." Further, research by Arduin, Laffer & Moore Econometrics shows that consumption would increase by 2.4% in the first year of the FairTax. The increase in consumption would be fueled by the 1.7% increase in disposable (after-tax) personal income that occurs once the FairTax was enacted. By the 10th year, disposable income would increase by 11.8% resulting in a corresponding increase in consumption of 11.7% over what it would be if the current tax system remained in place, and these results are based on the assumption that businesses use only the tax savings achieved from no longer having to pay the employer share of payroll taxes (for more details, see Promotion of economic growth).

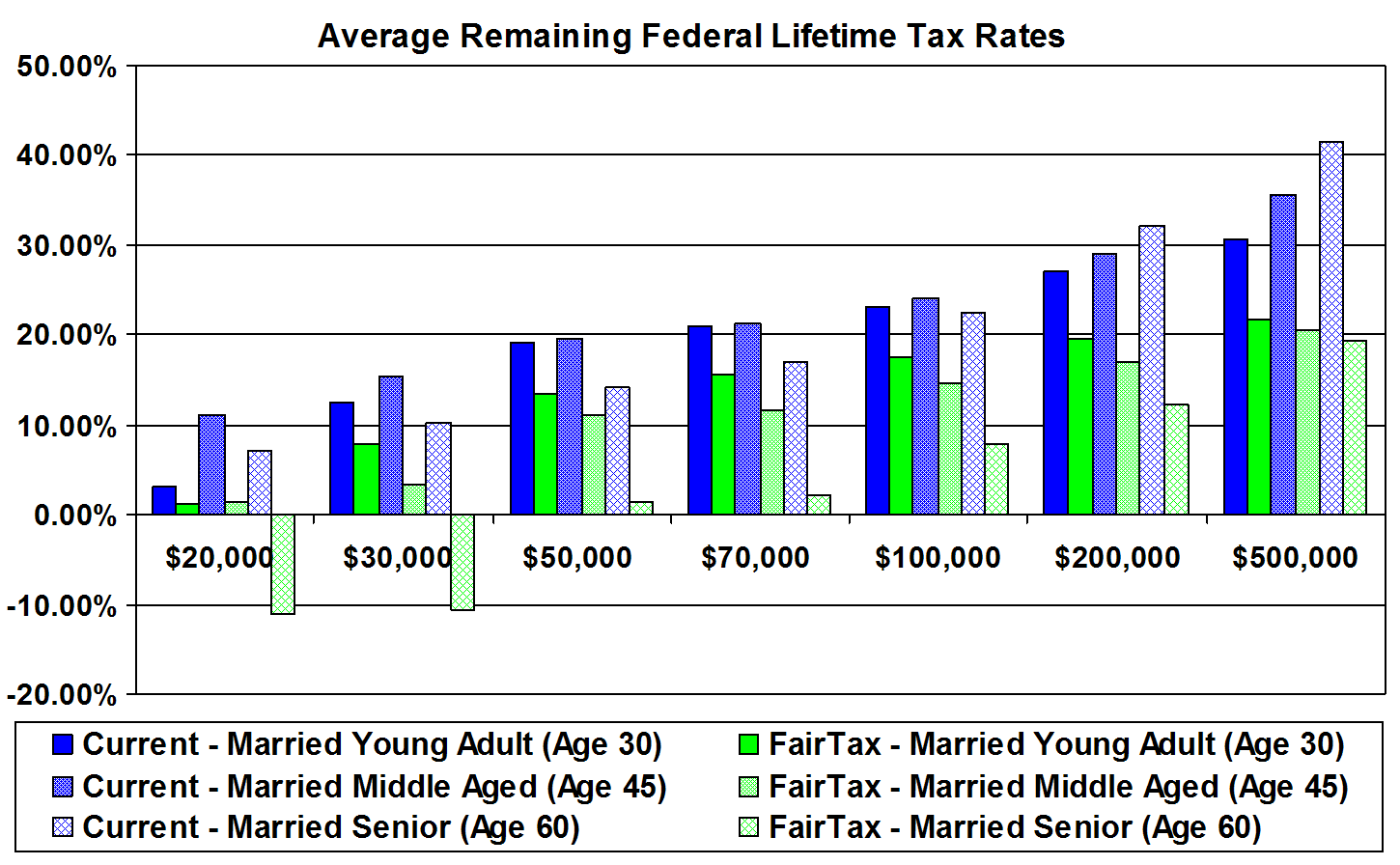
Boston University study of the FairTax - Average Remaining Federal Lifetime Tax Rates of married households

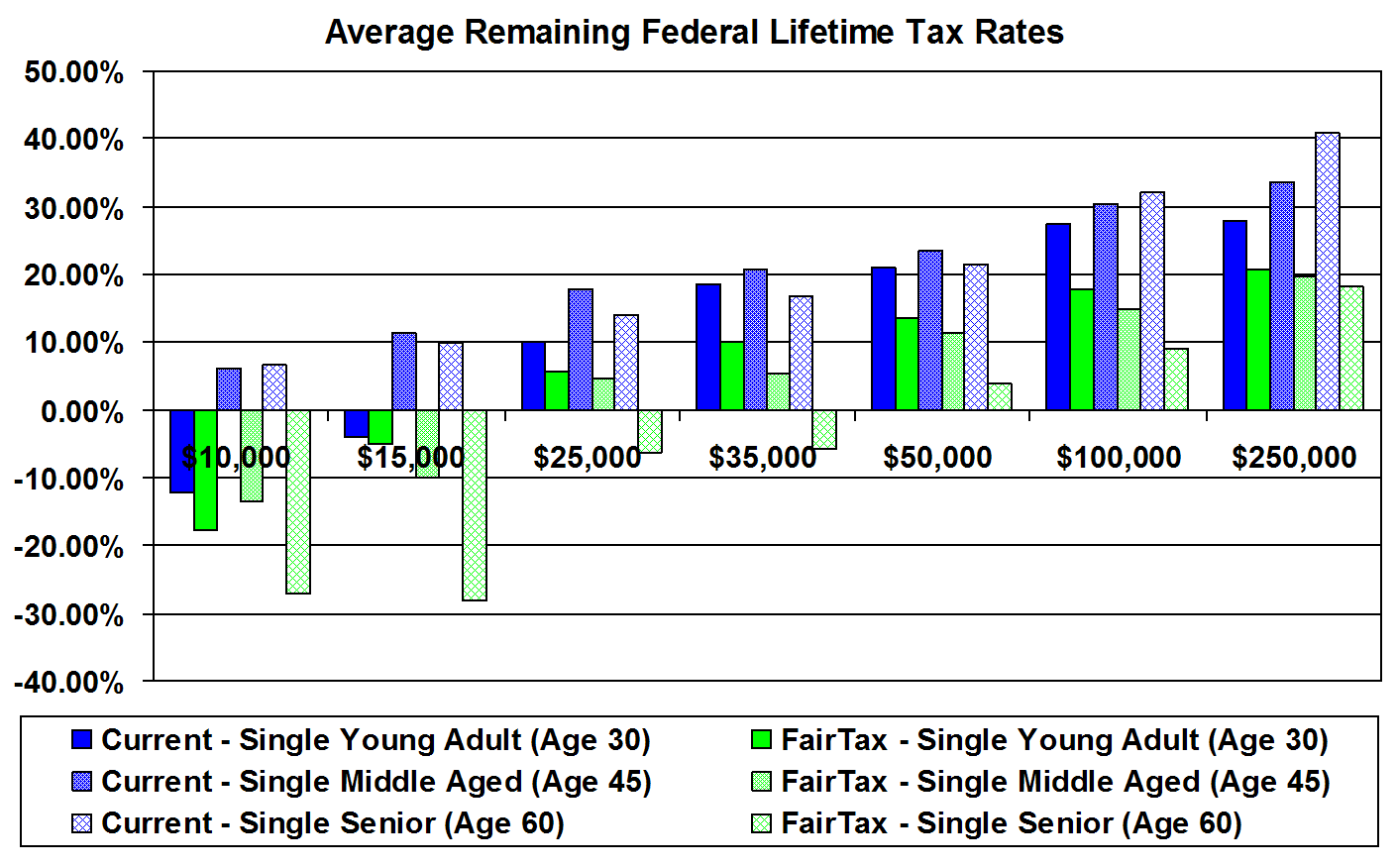
Boston University study of the FairTax - Average Remaining Federal Lifetime Tax Rates of single households

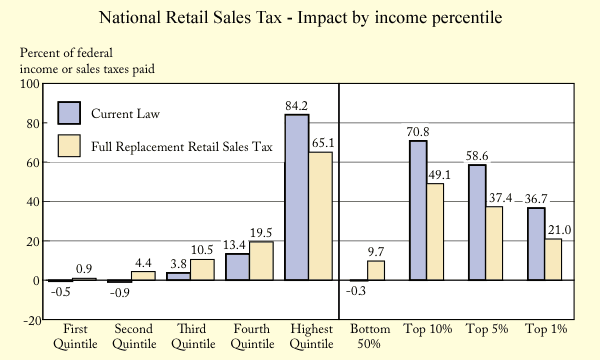
President's Advisory Panel's analysis of a hybrid National Sales Tax - Impact by income percentile (Does not replace all taxes proposed by the FairTax)

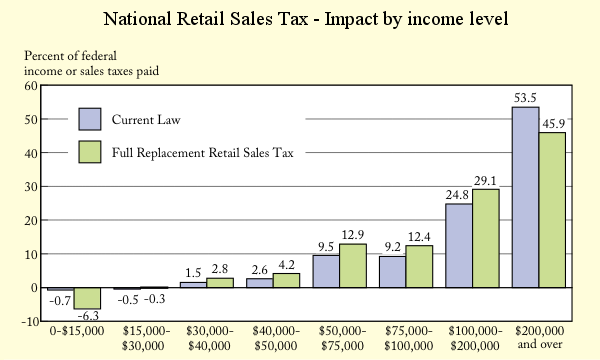
President's Advisory Panel's analysis of a hybrid National Sales Tax - Impact by income level (Does not replace all taxes proposed by the FairTax)

== Progressive / regressive debate ==
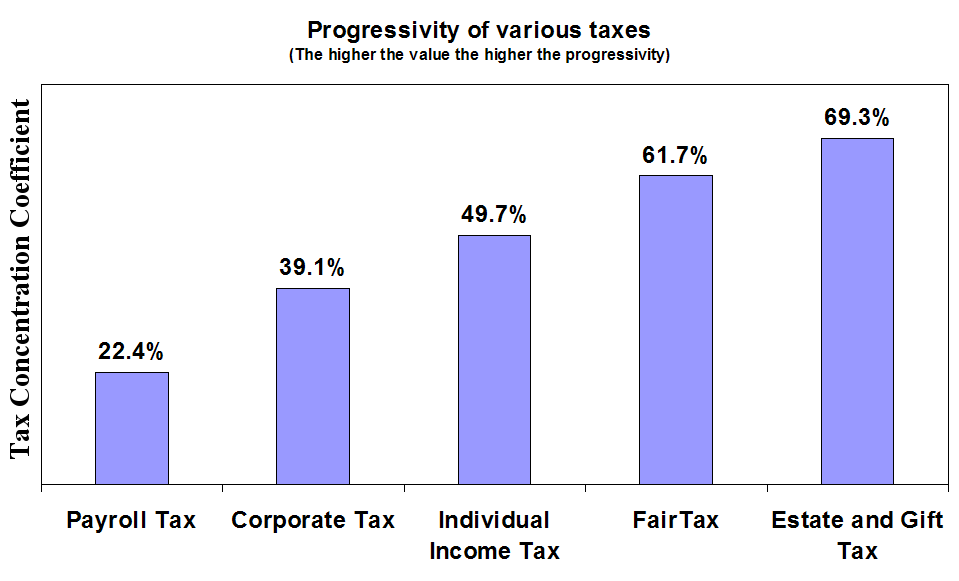
Tax concentration coefficient (a variant of the Gini coefficient) is a measure of tax inequality. The higher the number, the more progressive the tax.

Economist William G. Gale at the Brookings Institution writes: "Under the AFT proposal, taxes would rise for households in the bottom 90% of the income distribution, while households in the top 1% would receive an average tax cut of over $75,000." Gale continues, "If households are classified by consumption level, a somewhat different pattern emerges. Households in the bottom two-thirds of the distribution would pay less than currently, households in the top third would pay more." While Gale's analysis differed from the FairTax legislation, he is referring to absolute tax money—ranked by income, households at the lower end of the distribution will tend to pay more in absolute taxes, while households at the higher end will tend to pay less in absolute taxes. Ranked by spending or consumption, households that currently spend less on consumption would pay less total taxes, while households that currently spend more would pay more. For example, a family of four (a couple with two children) earning about $25,000 and spending this on taxable goods and services, would consume 100% of their income. A higher income family of four making about $100,000, spending $75,000, and saving $25,000, would consume only 75% of their income on taxable goods and services. When presented with an estimated effective tax rate, the low-income family above would pay a tax rate of 0% on the 100% of consumption and the higher income family would pay a tax rate of 15% on the 75% of consumption (with the other 25% taxed at a later point in time). A person spending at the poverty level would have an effective tax rate of 0%, whereas someone spending at four times the poverty level would have an effective tax rate of 17.2%.

These conclusions are contradictory according to Gale. The FairTax proposal is regressive on income (using a cross-section time frame) and progressive on sales. Classical economic analysis indicates that the marginal propensity to consume (MPC) decreases as income increases. Households at the lower end of the income scale spend almost all their income, while households at the higher end are more likely to devote a portion of income to saving. However, MPC and income elasticity of demand tend to increase as wealth increases. These facts explain the apparent contradiction in the data; households at the extreme high end of consumption often finance their purchases out of savings, not income. This savings would be taxed when it becomes a purchase. Income earned and saved would not be taxed immediately under the proposal. In other words, savings would be spent at some point in the future and taxed according to that consumption. FairTax advocates state that this would improve the taxing of wealth. Laurence Kotlikoff stated that the FairTax could make the tax system much more progressive and generationally equitable. The payroll tax system is regressive on income with no standard deduction or personal exemptions taxing only the first $97,500 ($94,200 for the year 2006) from gross wages, and none earned from capital investments or interest. Under the FairTax, payroll taxes would be eliminated. The Beacon Hill Institute at Suffolk University concluded in a 2007 study that "replacing income and payroll taxes with the FairTax would make the United States federal tax system more progressive than it is now".

FairTax progressive rate structure Married couple: Two children
Percent of poverty level	Spending	FairTax paid	Amount of rebate	Net taxes paid	Effective average tax rate
25%	$6,415	$1,475	$5,902	($4,427)	
50%	$12,830	$2,951	$5,902	($2,951)	
100%	$25,660	$5,902	$5,902	($0)	0.0%
150%	$38,490	$8,853	$5,902	$2,951	7.7%
200%	$51,320	$11,804	$5,902	$5,902	11.5%
300%	$76,980	$17,705	$5,902	$11,803	15.3%
400%	$102,640	$23,607	$5,902	$17,705	17.2%

== See also ==
- FairTax
- Predicted effects of the FairTax
- Revenue neutrality of the FairTax
- Americans For Fair Taxation
