= Revenue neutrality of the FairTax =

The Fair Tax Act (H.R. 25/S. 1025) is a bill in the United States Congress for changing tax laws to replace the Internal Revenue Service (IRS) and all federal income taxes (including Alternative Minimum Tax), payroll taxes (including Social Security and Medicare taxes), corporate taxes, capital gains taxes, gift taxes, and estate taxes with a national retail sales tax, to be levied once at the point of purchase on all new goods and services. The proposal also calls for a monthly payment to households of citizens and legal resident aliens (based on family size) as an advance rebate of tax on purchases up to the poverty level.

A key question surrounding the FairTax rate is the ability to be revenue-neutral; that is, whether its proposed monetary numbers would result in an increase or reduction in overall federal tax revenues, and if so how large this disparity would be. Economists, advisory groups, and political advocacy groups disagree about the tax rate required for the FairTax to be truly revenue-neutral. Researchers can use a different tax base, time frame, or methodology that make direct comparison among estimates difficult. The choice between static or dynamic scoring further complicates any estimate of revenue-neutral rates.

Proponents offer studies that calculate the tax rate consistent with the legislation (23% inclusive), while critics argue that the rate would need to be much higher and offer competing estimates. Supporters argue that if the rate seems too high or is otherwise higher, it brings to light the cost of the federal government and the true tax burden Congress has levied on the American taxpayer. Bruce Bartlett has stated that "public opinion polls have long shown that support for flat-rate tax reforms is extremely sensitive to the proposed rate, with support dropping off sharply at a rate higher than 23%." If the FairTax is presented like all real world U.S. sales taxes and foreign VATs (tax-exclusive), the rate would be presented as 30%. Opponents argue the 30% tax-exclusive figure is better understood by the general populace and that the use of the 23% tax-inclusive number is deceptive and misleading. Proponents state that the 23% presentation is easier to compare to the inclusive income tax rates being replaced.

== Tax rate for revenue neutrality ==
The primary rate presented adheres to the legislative framework of the FairTax bill in rate presentation, which is calculated as a percentage of total spending, sometimes called a tax-inclusive rate. The rate presentation of a traditional sales tax may also be included and is referred to as the tax-exclusive rate (see Presentation of tax rate).

=== Early research ===
Americans For Fair Taxation (AFFT) states that early research at Stanford University, The Heritage Foundation, the Cato Institute, and Fiscal Associates have calculated revenue-neutral rates between 22.3% and 24%. Jim Poterba of the Massachusetts Institute of Technology estimated a rate of 23.1% and Laurence Kotlikoff of Boston University found a rate of around 24%. Dale Jorgenson, a professor of economics at Harvard University and past President of the American Economic Association, purportedly estimated the revenue-neutral rate to be 22.9% but indicated in his 2002 book that he believes the rate would need to be higher. The research was commissioned by AFFT and they have not made these studies public. The studies are also not published by the economists that conducted those studies. Critics have stated that the early studies failed to properly account for the additional revenue required for the increased government spending needed pay the FairTax on their purchases.

=== Recent studies ===
One of the leading economists supporting the FairTax is Dr. Laurence Kotlikoff of Boston University. A detailed 2006 study published in Tax Notes by Beacon Hill Institute at Suffolk University and Dr. Kotlikoff concluded the FairTax would be revenue-neutral for the tax year 2007 at a rate of 23.82% (31.27% tax-exclusive) assuming full taxpayer compliance. The study states that purchasing power is transferred to state and local taxpayers from state and local governments. To recapture the lost revenue, state and local governments may raise taxes in order to continue collecting the same real revenues from their taxpayers. State and local governments would be able to maintain their real spending levels, despite the requirement that they pay the FairTax on their purchases. The Argus Group and Arduin, Laffer & Moore Econometrics each published an analysis that defended the 23% rate. While proponents of the FairTax concede that the above studies did not explicitly account for tax evasion, they also claim that the studies did not altogether ignore tax evasion under the FairTax. These studies implicitly incorporated some degree of tax evasion in their calculations simply by using National Income and Product Account based figures that presumably understate total household consumption. Moreover, these studies did not account for the expected capital gains that would result from a reduction in the real nominal value of U.S. government debt and the increased economic growth that economists believe would occur.

In contrast to the above studies, one of the leading economists opposing the FairTax, William Gale of the Brookings Institution, published a detailed 2005 study in Tax Notes that estimated a rate of 28.2% (39.3% tax-exclusive) for 2007 assuming full taxpayer compliance and an average rate of 31% (44% tax-exclusive) from 2006–2015 (an increase that accounts for the replacement of an additional $3 trillion in revenue collected through the Alternative Minimum Tax (AMT) impacting the middle class over the 10-year period). The study also concluded that if the tax base were eroded by 10% due to tax evasion, tax avoidance, and/or legislative adjustments, the average rate would be 34% (53% tax-exclusive) for the 10-year period. The study did not take into consideration the increase in economic activity that Gale expects would result from the imposition of the FairTax.

=== Additional sales tax studies ===
Additional studies have been performed on national retail sales tax plans that may not conform to the tax base as defined in the FairTax legislation but are often considered when discussing FairTax rates. These studies are often of prior sales tax legislation, similar tax models, or based on the assumption that the tax base used in the FairTax legislation is illogical or likely to be modified by Congress before passage. The President's Advisory Panel for Federal Tax Reform performed a 2006 analysis to replace the individual and corporate income tax (excluding other taxes) with a retail sales tax and found the rate to be 25% (34% tax-exclusive) assuming 15% tax evasion, and 33% (49% tax-exclusive) with 30% tax evasion. The rate would need to be substantially higher to replace the additional taxes replaced by the FairTax (payroll, estate, and gift taxes). The Chairman of the President's Advisory Panel, former U.S. Senator Connie Mack, stated that the panel did not evaluate H.R. 25 (the FairTax). The panel was not allowed to consider reforming regressive payroll taxes and they reduced the tax base by adding large exclusions. In determining the rate, the panel assumed that revenue generated from taxing federal spending would be canceled out by increased government expenditures required to pay such taxes, a factor the panel claims was neglected from early FairTax rate analysis. The Treasury Department has refused to release for peer review the detailed figures and methodology used in the tax panel analysis. FairTax proponents, the Beacon Hill Institute, and Dr. Kotlikoff have criticized the President's Advisory Panel's study as having altered the terms of the FairTax and using unsound methodology.

The Treasury Department estimates (prepared for the Tax Panel) excluded government consumption, significantly altering the tax base and therefore the tax rate. Other studies point out that the current system is also counting taxes the government would pay to itself by including matched payroll taxes of government employees, covering the corporate and payroll tax expenses of its contractors and their suppliers, and paying embedded tax costs under the current system (see Theories of retail pricing). The tax panel included large expenditures to local and state governments for the FairTax burden; however, the Beacon Hill Institute suggested a flaw in this logic and showed that the FairTax imposes no additional real fiscal burdens on state and local government. A similar level of taxation is required when shifting from taxing income to consumption in order to maintain the tax burden on government. Proponents assert that government needs to be taxed to keep a level playing field between government enterprises and private enterprises. Dr. Karen Walby, Director of Research for the Americans For Fair Taxation, discussed a recent study by Young & Associates on evasion and enforcement that identifies certain key variables which influence the level of compliance (marginal tax rates, likelihood of audit, severity of penalties, etc.) and concludes the FairTax is superior on most/all of these and would therefore have lower rates of evasion than alternatives. While the FairTax studies did not account for tax evasion, neither did they ignore it. The studies have implicitly incorporated a significant degree of tax evasion in calculations simply by using National Income and Product Account based figures that understate total household consumption. In addition, the studies did not account for the capital gain stemming from the reduction in the real nominal value of U.S. government debt and the increased economic growth that economists and FairTax supporters believe would occur.

Congress's bipartisan Joint Committee on Taxation (JCT) evaluated a proposal similar to FairTax that included additional exemptions and estimated a revenue-neutral rate of around 36%.

In a 2004 study, the Institute on Taxation and Economic Policy (ITEP) compensated for factors which artificially enlarge the economic base prior to collection of American sales tax in reality (government transactions, non-financial transactions, tax exemptions, evasion, etc.) to the FairTax's supposed tax base, concluding that either the FairTax would have to be increased to 53%, or its originally proposed 30% rate would fall short of FY2005 federal revenues by 41%.

Proponents charge that the Presidential Tax Panel, the JCT, and ITEP are motivated to maintain the "status quo" and thus modify the tax base from the proposed legislation to achieve higher rates, and conclude that since opponents could not kill the FairTax proposal based on merits or lack thereof; they create their own plan with an exaggerated rate to make it politically not feasible. The FairTax would apply to a purported gross base of $11.467 trillion, theoretically one-third larger than the income tax base of $9.706 trillion. For that reason, the average marginal rate of such a tax base under the FairTax would be, by definition, significantly lower than current law. If the rate is too high, no matter what the rate, it brings to light the cost of the federal government and the true tax burden Congress has levied on the American taxpayer (see Tax burden visibility). The Secretary of the Treasury, Henry M. Paulson, stated in 2006 that he would investigate the FairTax in a very comprehensive way using resources outside the Treasury.

== See also ==
- Americans For Fair Taxation
- Distribution of the FairTax burden
- Predicted effects of the FairTax
- FairTax
