= Predicted effects of the FairTax =

Analysis of a proposed U.S. tax reform

The Fair Tax Act (H.R. 25/S. 122) is a bill in the United States Congress for changing tax laws to replace the Internal Revenue Service (IRS) and all federal income taxes (including Alternative Minimum Tax), payroll taxes (including Social Security and Medicare taxes), corporate taxes, capital gains taxes, gift taxes, and estate taxes with a national retail sales tax, to be levied once at the point of purchase on all new goods and services. The proposal also calls for a monthly payment to households of citizens and legal resident aliens (based on family size) as an advance rebate of tax on purchases up to the poverty level.

Supporters argue that a consumption tax, such as the FairTax, would have a positive impact on available capital (through deferred taxation on investment), increased U.S. international competitiveness (border tax adjustment in global trade), incentives for international business to locate in the U.S., increased economic growth, and ease of tax compliance. The plan may increase cost transparency for funding the federal government and supporters believe it would have positive effects on civil liberties, the environment, and advantages with taxing illegal activity and illegal immigrants. Because the FairTax plan would remove taxes on income, tax deductions would have no meaning or value, which concerns some lawmakers about losing this method of social incentive. There are also concerns regarding the repeal of the Sixteenth Amendment, transition effects on after-tax savings, impact to the income tax industry, incentives on credit use, and the loss of tax advantages to state and local bonds.

== Economic effects ==
=== Tax burden visibility ===
FairTax supporters assert that the proposal would make the cost of federal government highly visible as consumers would see most of this cost in a single tax paid every time they purchase a good or service. Under the current tax system, the federal government collects revenue through a wide variety of taxes on individuals and businesses. Thus the cost of government is spread out among many different avenues and may not be fully visible to individual citizens. For example, corporate taxes and compliance costs are passed partially from producers to final consumers when producers include those costs in the retail price of goods and services. The use of income tax withholding has also reduced the visibility of taxes. The U.S. Department of Treasury describes (in the history of the income tax) that withholding "greatly reduced the taxpayer's awareness of the amount of tax being collected, i.e. it reduced the transparency of the tax, which made it easier to raise taxes in the future." Proponents claim that the FairTax would greatly reduce, if not eliminate, the "K Street tax lobbyist's" ability to influence legislators to manipulate the U.S. tax code for the benefit of their clients. The FairTax legislation does not prevent future changes by Congress, however, due to the transparency of the FairTax, the American people would be aware of changes to the tax base from exemptions because a change in tax rate would likely be reflected. Congressman John Linder, the bill sponsor, is considering adding language to H.R. 25 during the 111th Congress that would require a supermajority vote of Congress to exempt any industry from the tax.

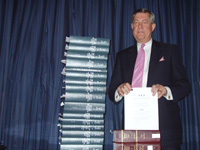
U.S. Rep John Linder holding the 132 page Fair Tax Act in contrast to the more than 60,000 pages of tax code laws and regulations currently in effect.

=== Effect on tax compliance costs ===
The cost of preparing and filing all business and personal income tax returns is estimated to be $250–$300 billion each year. Approximately the same amount of money was estimated for calculating the tax implications of business decisions. That means approximately $500 to $600 billion was spent in the process of collecting roughly four times as much in taxes. According to a 2005 report from the U.S. Government Accountability Office, the efficiency cost of the current tax system—the output that is lost over and above the tax itself—is between $240 billion and $600 billion every year. Supporters argue that the FairTax system would reduce these compliance and efficiency costs by 90% and return a larger share of that money to the productive economy. With the FairTax system, the cost of compliance would be built into the tax by allowing the business and the State to keep 1/4 of 1% of taxes collected. A 2007 study by the Beacon Hill Institute found that the FairTax would save $346.51 billion in administrative costs and would be a much more efficient taxation system from the point of view of the administration, collection, and filing costs.

One additional "cost" more difficult to quantify is the cumulative cost of business decisions made, not in the interest of delivering more/better product and services, but rather in tax avoidance behaviors. An example might be the purchase of a small company with tremendous financial losses just to avoid corporate income tax on the larger, more profitable business. With 60,000+ pages now in the tax code, the impact of these decisions both on individual companies and on the economy at large is doubtless significant.

=== Promotion of economic growth ===
In an open letter to the President, the Congress, and the American people, eighty economists, including Nobel Laureate Vernon L. Smith, stated that the FairTax would boost the United States economy. A study in 2007 by the Beacon Hill Institute of Suffolk University stated that within five years real GDP would increase 10.7% over the current system, domestic investment by 86.3%, capital stock by 9.3%, employment by 9.9%, real wages by 10.2%, and consumption by 1.8%. Laurence Kotlikoff of Boston University finds that the shift to the FairTax would raise marginal labor productivity and real wages over the course of the century by 18.9% and long-run output by 10.6%. Further, studies of the FairTax at Boston University and Rice University suggests the FairTax will bring long-term interest rates down by as much as one third. As falling tax compliance costs lower production costs, exports would increase by 26% initially and remain more than 13% above present levels. According to Professor Dale Jorgenson of Harvard University’s Economics Department, revenues to Social Security and Medicare would double as the size of the economy doubles within 15 years after passage of the FairTax. Wall Street Journal columnist James Taranto states the FairTax is unsuited to take advantage of supply-side effects and would create a powerful disincentive to spend money.

A Nathan Associates study commissioned by the National Retail Federation in 2000 that found a national sales tax bill filed by Billy Tauzin (Individual Tax Freedom Act) would bring a 3 year decline in the economy, a 4 year decline in employment and an 8 year decline in consumer spending. Proponents point out that the FairTax has different features than the Tauzin bill and that the study done by the NRF makes many adverse assumptions and does not take into account the removal of embedded tax costs or the inventory credit that refunds 23% of the cost of held inventory. The study, which represents supporters' worst-case scenario for a consumption tax, predicts that the economy will grow only 3% more in ten years than it would have under the income tax and that the increase in consumption will be 1.15% less in the first year relative to what it would have been under the income tax. The study concludes that consumption will be higher in the fourth year and every year thereafter than it would have been under the income tax. Research in 2006 on the FairTax plan by Arduin, Laffer & Moore Econometrics shows that consumption would increase by 2.4% in the first year of the FairTax. The increase in consumption would be fueled by the 1.7% increase in disposable (after-tax) personal income. By the 10th year, consumption would increase by 11.7% over the current tax system; and disposable income would be up by 11.8%.

FairTax simulation model results
Cumulative growth over current system	Year 1	Year 2	Year 3	Year 4	Year 5	Year 10
Gross domestic product	2.4%	5.2%	7.0%	8.2%	9.0%	11.3%
Employment	3.5%	5.7%	7.0%	7.7%	8.2%	9.0%
Domestic investment	33.0%	35.4%	36.9%	38.0%	38.8%	41.2%
Income from employment (wages)	27.4%	31.8%	34.5%	36.4%	37.7%	41.2%
Consumption	2.4%	4.1%	5.8%	7.1%	8.1%	11.7%
Disposable personal income (adjusted for changes in the price level)	1.7%	4.5%	6.4%	7.7%	8.7%	11.8%
Units scaled 2004 GDP = 1.00. Capital and labor set to equal constant shares of 0.3 and 0.7, respectively. Source: Arduin, Laffer & Moore Econometrics, "A Macroeconomic Analysis of the FairTax Proposal", February, 2006.

=== Effect on international business locality ===
Global corporations consider local tax structures when making planning and capital investment decisions. Lower corporate tax rates and favorable transfer pricing regulations can induce higher corporate investment in a given locality. Such investment translates into higher economic growth. Ireland's real GDP growth was almost three times higher than the European Union average between 1991 and 2000. This is partly attributed to the fact that, during the decade, Ireland taxed corporate profits from manufacturing at 10%, the lowest in the EU. The United States currently has the highest combined statutory corporate income tax rate among OECD countries. The FairTax would remove the corporate income tax, which supporters argue would make the United States the largest corporate tax haven in the world.

Bill Archer, former head of the House Ways and Means Committee, asked Princeton University econometricists to survey 500 European and Asian companies regarding the impact on their business decisions if the United States enacted the FairTax. Of these companies, 400 responded that they would build their next plant in the United States while the remaining 100 companies said they would move their corporate headquarters to the United States.

=== Border adjustability ===
The United States is the only one of 30 OECD countries with no border adjustment element in its tax system. Proponents state that because the FairTax would automatically be border adjustable, the 17% competitive advantage, on average, of foreign producers would be eliminated, immediately boosting U.S. competitiveness overseas and at home. Leo Linbeck, chairman of FairTax.org, has stated that U.S. manufacturers and sellers can not compete successfully with foreign producers because of U.S. tax policy. "The Ways and Means Committee is tasked with writing the taxation laws that raise revenues for the nation but the fact that foreign nations routinely tax U.S. products upon entry and that these nations forgo national taxes on exports to the United States is a Ways and Means blind spot that has all but killed the 'Made in America' label". Under the FairTax, American companies doing business internationally would be able to sell their goods at lower prices but at similar margins, and this would bring jobs to America. In addition, U.S. companies with investments or plants abroad would bring home overseas profits without the penalty of paying income taxes, thus resulting in more U.S. capital investment. This would result in imports and domestic production competing on a level playing field. Exported goods would not be subject to the FairTax, since they would not be consumed in the U.S.; but imported goods sold in the U.S. would be subject to the FairTax because these products would be consumed domestically.

=== Repatriation of offshore accounts ===
John Linder asserts that an estimated 11 trillion dollars is currently held in foreign accounts, largely for tax purposes, and is growing by $800 billion per year. Former Federal Reserve Chairman Alan Greenspan predicts that enactment of the FairTax would result in a large portion of those funds being transferred to U.S. banks, where they would become available to U.S. capital markets, bringing down interest rates, and otherwise promoting economic growth in the United States instead of the countries where those funds are currently held.

== Transition effects ==
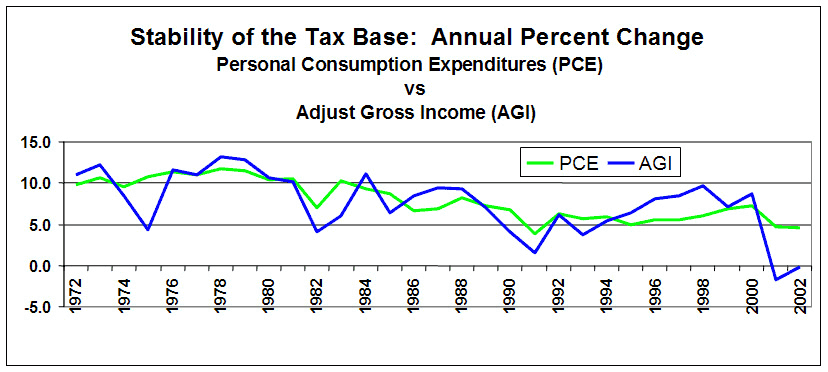
Stability of the Tax Base: A comparison of Personal Consumption Expenditures and adjusted gross income.

Because the FairTax proposal would replace various taxes with a single sales tax, several areas may experience unique effects through the transition.

=== Repeal of Sixteenth Amendment ===
If the FairTax bill were passed, permanent elimination of income taxation would not be guaranteed; the FairTax bill would repeal much of the existing tax code, but the Sixteenth Amendment would remain in place. Cases decided by the United States Supreme Court after the ratification of the Sixteenth Amendment have established that Congress has the power to enact an income tax even if the amendment did not exist. The elimination of the possibility that income taxation would return (through a separate Congressional bill), requires a repeal of the Sixteenth Amendment to the United States Constitution along with expressly prohibiting an income tax. This is referred to as an "aggressive repeal". The Constitution, however, does not require an income tax, it only allows one. Separate income taxes enforced by individual states would be unaffected by the federal repeal.

Since passing the FairTax would only require a simple majority in each house of the United States Congress and the signature of the President, and enactment of a constitutional amendment must be approved by two thirds of each house of Congress, and three quarters of the individual U.S. states, it is possible that passage of the FairTax bill would simply add another taxation system. If a new income tax bill was passed after the FairTax passage, a combined system could develop. However, there is nothing preventing the addition of a national sales tax, or VAT tax, on top of today's income tax system. The Americans For Fair Taxation plan is to first pass the FairTax and then to focus grassroots efforts on HJR 16, sponsored by Congressman Steve King (R-IA), that calls for the repeal of the Sixteenth Amendment.

Congressman Linder (110th Congress), the bill sponsor, has stated "If the FairTax is enacted, I expect that the Congress and states would promptly begin consideration of legislation to repeal the Sixteenth Amendment. To make certain that occurs, however, I am in favor of adding language to H.R. 25 during the 111th Congress that includes a sunset provision, meaning that either we succeed in repealing the Sixteenth Amendment within five years after the implementation of the FairTax or the FairTax goes away. In my view, we simply cannot risk having both a national income tax and a national sales tax in place at the same time."

=== Effect on savers ===
Individuals under the current system who accumulated savings from ordinary income (by choosing not to spend their money when the income was earned) paid taxes on that income before it was placed in savings (such as a Roth IRA or CD). When individuals spend above the poverty level with money saved under the current system, that spending would be subject to the FairTax. People living through the transition may find both their earnings and their spending taxed. Critics have claimed that the FairTax would result in unfair double taxation for savers and suggest it does not address the transition effect on some taxpayers who have accumulated significant savings from after-tax dollars, especially retirees who have finished their careers and switched to spending down their life savings.

Supporters of the plan argue that the current system is no different, since compliance costs and "hidden taxes" embedded in the prices of goods and services cause savings to be "taxed" a second time already when spent. The FairTax would also eliminate what some claim to be the double taxation on savings that is part of estate taxes. In addition, the FairTax legislation adjusts Social Security benefits for changes in the price level, so a percentage increase in prices would result in an equal percentage increase to Social Security income. Supporters suggest these changes would offset paying the FairTax under transition conditions.

In contrast to ordinary savings, money in tax-deferred savings plans such as IRA, 401k, etc. would be withdrawn tax-free. There is currently $11 trillion in such accounts. This represents future tax revenue owed to the federal government under the income tax system, which has been estimated at $3 trillion. This revenue would then fall under the FairTax system for collection.

=== Income tax industry ===
During the transition, many or most of the employees of the IRS (105,978 in 2005) would face loss of employment. The Beacon Hill Institute estimate is that the federal government would be able to cut $8 billion from the IRS budget of $11.01 billion (in 2007), reducing the size of federal tax administration by 73%. In addition, income tax preparers (many seasonal), tax lawyers, tax compliance staff in medium-to-large businesses, and software companies which sell tax preparation software (such as Drake Software, TaxCut, and TurboTax), could face significant drops, changes, or loss of employment. Proponents state the income tax industry often provides year-round services for financial planning and investment, which is expected to increase under the FairTax proposal and could offset some of these changes. New technologies used by the IRS, such as e-filing, are simplifying the process and already threatening a portion of this industry as goals set by Congress call for at least 80% of federal returns to be submitted electronically by 2007. According to IRS testimony from 2004, 45% of revenue agents and officers would become eligible for retirement in the following 5 years and there is concern about the loss of their work force as their hiring efforts struggle to keep pace with attrition. In addition, the IRS would not go completely out of commission until 3 years after the FairTax was enacted, providing employees time to find other employment. Proponents claim the projected 10.5% growth in the economy during the first year of the FairTax would provide plenty of new jobs to these workers that are typically well educated and well equipped with transferable skills (see creative destruction).

=== Time arbitrage ===
In the period before the FairTax was implemented, there could be a strong incentive for individuals to buy goods without the sales tax using credit. After the FairTax was in effect, the credit could be paid off using untaxed payroll. On the other hand, the FairTax includes a 23% inclusive transitional inventory tax credit on the cost of the inventory to be applied in the month that it is sold. The transitional inventory tax credit would significantly reduce any changes to the net cost after switching to the FairTax. If credit incentives do not change, opponents of the FairTax worry it could exacerbate an existing consumer debt problem. On the other hand, proponents of the FairTax note that this effect could also allow individuals to pay off their existing (pre-FairTax) debt quicker.

== Other indirect effects ==
=== Home mortgage interest deduction ===
The current federal income tax law allows individuals to deduct the home mortgage interest costs from taxable income (unless the taxpayer is subject to the Alternative Minimum Tax). Home mortgage interest is one of the few personal expenditures that is treated in this manner. Someone paying a 25% income tax rate would receive $250 back from the government for $1,000 expended in home mortgage interest. While there is no deduction for payroll taxes and most do not itemize the income tax deduction for full benefit, this preferential treatment of mortgage interest encourages households to spend relatively more of their income on housing than would otherwise be the case.

The FairTax would be tax free on mortgage interest up to the basic interest rate as determined by the Federal Reserve. The interest above the basic rate applied by the lender is a financial intermediation service and is subject to the FairTax (on a typical home mortgage only about one-half of one percent of interest would be subject to tax). Several economic studies have estimated that switching from an income tax system to a consumption tax system such as the FairTax would result in an interest rate drop of approximately 25%. These changes would result in a decreased cost for home buyers. As a comparison to the FairTax for encouraging home ownership, the current tax system would have to allow all taxpayers to fully deduct the purchase of used property against income and payroll taxes, expand the mortgage interest deduction so that it permits a deduction against payroll taxes, fully untax interest income to lenders and institutions, and fully untax returns on savings. However, since several areas would be tax free under the FairTax plan, it could decrease the social incentive to spend more on homes in favor of savings, education, or other investments.

=== Charitable giving ===
Like the home mortgage interest deduction, charitable giving receives preferential treatment under current tax law allowing individuals to deduct the donation, to certain charities, from taxable income. Someone paying a 25% income tax rate would receive $250 back from the government for a $1,000 donation. While there is no deduction for payroll taxes and most do not itemize the deduction for full benefit, this encourages households to donate more of their income to charity than would otherwise be the case. As the FairTax would only tax new retail purchases, donations to charity would be made with untaxed income (comparable to a deduction on both income and payroll taxes). The FairTax would also remove the prohibition of political speech by non-profits, therefore removing the threat to non-profit status. Taxable property and services purchased by a qualified non-profit or religious organization 'for business purposes' would not be taxable.

FairTax advocates state that total philanthropy as a percentage of GDP has held steady at around 2% for at least two decades, regardless of changes in income tax deductibility. According to the National Bureau of Economic Research, GDP would increase almost 10.5% in the first year after the FairTax goes into effect. FairTax advocates claim this economic boost, along with an estimated 8% real wage increase, would strengthen charitable giving. In a 2007 study, the Beacon Hill Institute concluded that total charitable giving would increase under the FairTax, although increases in giving would not be distributed proportionately amongst the various types of charitable organizations. "Due to differences in preferences for type of charitable organizations between itemizers and non-itemizers, religious charities stand to gain disproportionately under the FairTax, while education, health, and cultural charities will actually suffer a small loss."

=== Environment ===
Proponents believe environmental benefits would result both indirectly and directly from implementation of the FairTax. Former Senator Mike Gravel has called it a "green tax". The concepts of environmental economics come into play with some of the aspects suggested. With the FairTax being levied only on new goods and services, with no federal tax charged on used goods, supporters suggest a systemic incentive to buy used goods is introduced. Consequently, re-use and re-sale of used goods is encouraged. With the subsequent increase of the used-goods market (and with new goods being taxed) it is suspected that people would put more emphasis on maintenance of things for longer use and better resale value, and that they may also shy away from disposable goods. The significant reduction of paperwork for IRS compliance and tax forms is estimated to save about 300,000 trees each year. With the expected increase of business and manufacturing movement to the U.S., more goods consumed domestically will be produced domestically. This may reduce international shipping and consequent environmental impact, as well as production in countries with less stringent pollution controls.

=== State and local government debt ===
The federal income tax system provides tax advantages to state and local municipal bonds. Specifically, the interest paid on such securities is exempt from federal taxation. This tax discount allows state and local governments to issue debt at low yields, which reduces their interest costs. By eliminating income taxes, FairTax would remove the federal tax advantage of holding state and local bonds as all investments would become tax free. However, the Treasury department has called for the elimination of these special tax provisions under the current system in an effort to broaden the tax base and reduce corporate tax rates. State and local governments often exempt their own taxes when issuing bonds, so they could still contain some advantages. Issuers may have to offer higher interest rates to attract investors. Americans For Fair Taxation argue that, after the fair tax goes into effect, corporate bond rates would drop; that new tax free yields will roughly equal their previous after tax value under the income tax; and that state and municipal bond holders would not need to change their rates.

=== Illegal immigration ===
The current system of taxation, in many cases, provides incentives for illegal immigrants and companies that employ them. It is estimated that approximately 5 million illegal immigrants are paid off the books ("under the table") in cash allowing employee and employer to avoid paying federal taxes estimated at $35 billion a year. Advocates also claim the FairTax would provide incentive for illegal immigrants to legalize as they would otherwise not receive the FairTax rebate.

=== Civil liberties ===
Proponents believe that the FairTax would have positive effects on civil liberties that are sometimes charged against the income tax system. Some of these include social inequality, economic inequality, financial privacy, self-incrimination, unreasonable search and seizure, burden of proof, and due process. Proponents state the FairTax would remove the exemptions and deductions that discriminate against gays, singles, childless couples, and others based on spending and lifestyle choices. The principles of an income tax regarding individual liberty are also argued by critics. Frank Chodorov wrote "... you come up with the fact that it gives the government a prior lien on all the property produced by its subjects." The government "unashamedly proclaims the doctrine of collectivized wealth. ... That which it does not take is a concession." This situation is no different from the current system of income taxation, in which the government has a "prior lien" on all labor undertaken by its subjects.

== Distribution of tax burden ==
The impact of the FairTax on the distribution of the tax burden is a point of dispute. The plan's supporters argue that it would decrease tax burdens, broaden the tax base, be progressive, increase purchasing power, and tax wealth, while opponents argue that a national sales tax would be inherently regressive and would decrease tax burdens paid by high-income individuals. Sales taxes are normally considered regressive though the FairTax provides a rebate that supporters argue would create a progressive effective rate on consumption. However, the Fairtax would also eliminate the EITC and CTC, dramatically reducing this benefit. Additionally the FairTax would be applied to goods that are currently not subject to sales tax. These include all food, all prescription drugs and other health care products and services (such as doctor’s visits and laboratory tests), purchases of new homes, and utility bills. These goods make up a substantial share of low income families expenses. An analysis by Kuang et al. found that "the current federal tax system is more progressive than the FairTax Plan under both annual and lifetime income approaches." Additionally, in their analysis the FairTax plan was not revenue neutral and would require "at least a 40% tax-exclusive rate" though at higher tax rates "the Fairtax plan becomes even more regressive". A panel appointed by the bush administration to study tax reform proposals found that at a tax rate of 34% the plan would raise taxes on all income groups except those earning under $15 thousand or over $200 thousand per year. Taking into account the impacts of Fairtax on state budgets and tax avoidance, an analysis by William Gale at Urban Brookings Tax Policy Center finds that even optimistic assumptions would require a 53% tax exclusive rate, far higher than the 30% rate that's commonly proposed.

== See also ==
- Americans For Fair Taxation
- Distribution of the FairTax burden
- Revenue neutrality of the FairTax
- FairTax
