= Public Sector Credit Framework =

Risk assessment software regarding government debt

The Public Sector Credit Framework is an open source tool for estimating the default risk of and assigning ratings to government debt. The PSCF installation package was released on May 2, 2012. At the same time, source code was published on GitHub. The publishers, PF2 Securities Evaluations and Public Sector Credit Solutions, said that they released the software in response to the need for "transparent, objective and up-to-date government credit ratings." The project has similar goals to an earlier mass collaboration bond rating effort, Wikirating.

== Description ==
PSCF calculates government default probabilities through the use of a multi-year fiscal simulation and a default point, expressed in terms of a user-specified financial ratio. The proportion of simulation trials surpassing the default point represents the default probability for a given year. The simulation is typically created in an Excel worksheet. Each row of the worksheet represents a different user specified series. Series may contain random numbers, macroeconomic variables, revenues, expenditures and debt levels. In a typical simulation, random numbers are listed first, then macroeconomic variables are specified as functions of the random variables (as well as constants and previous levels of the macroeconomic variable). Revenues and expenditures can then be expressed as functions of the macroeconomic variables.

=== Antecedents ===
The use of a fiscal simulation as a tool for rating government bonds appears to be unique to PSCF. However, simulation has been used as a tool for rating other fixed income assets and fiscal simulations have been used by some budget authorities.

== Technology ==
The framework combines a user interface written in Microsoft Excel with a processing engine written in GNU C. Developers have expressed an intention to support a full open source run-time environment. According to PSCF's creators, Excel was chosen as the initial user interface platform because of its popularity in the financial community. The PSCF user enters model parameters in Excel and then launches a control panel implemented in Excel VBA. When the user runs an analysis from within the control panel, his or her entries are converted to a C program, which is then compiled and executed. Outputs from the C program are returned to new tabs in the Excel workbook. The C program performs a multi-year budget simulation using random number generation routines from the open source Boost C++ Library.

Version 1.1 released in May 2013 added support for multi-threading, accelerating calculations on systems with multiple processors or multiple cores.

== History ==
The initial release of PSCF was accompanied by sample rating models for the United States and for the state of California. A preliminary model for Italy was published in July 2012. After its release, the framework received coverage on The Financial Times Alphaville web site. Reporter Joseph Cotterill noted that the framework had the potential to produce "a view of sovereign credit free of the subjectivity and bias that could creep into more qualitatively-based ratings judgements." The framework was also covered in Government Technology News, in The Bond Buyer, and on Shareable.net, among other publications. The Shareable article described inconsistencies between corporate and government bond ratings that allegedly resulted in taxpayers paying for unnecessary government bond insurance.

In July 2012, the software was covered on The Lang and O'Leary Exchange, a prime time business program on CBC. Later that month, the developers of PSCF released an Italian sovereign default probability model which was reported in the daily version of Milano Finanza, MF.

In August 2012, the framework was presented at the Municipal Finance Conference at Brandeis University. Public Sector Credit Solutions also posted a YouTube! video describing the rationale for PSCF as well as its use.

In September 2012, PSCF was the subject of an article in a peer-reviewed economics journal.

As of late 2013, PSCF had not been mentioned in other journal articles, but it has appeared in economist blog posts. Economist Krassimir Petrov discussed the weaknesses of sovereign bond ratings and the potential role of PSCF in improving them in a November 30, 2013 post in Naked Capitalism. Diane Lim, then Chief Economist for the Concord Coalition, discussed PSCF and its implications for US Treasury rates in The Tabulation on September 6, 2013.

=== Canadian Province Study ===
In October 2012, the Macdonald-Lauirer Institute published a study entitled "Provincial Solvency and Federal Obligations" which contained default probability estimates for the ten Canadian provinces generated by PSCF. The study's findings were reported by major Canadian media including the Financial Post, Globe and Mail, Maclean's magazine and the Canadian Broadcasting Corporation.

=== Illinois Study ===
Another study using PSCF default probabilities was released in June 2013 by the Mercatus Center. This analysis, "Modeling Credit Risks in Illinois and Indiana", concluded that Illinois did not have substantial credit risk and that yields on Illinois bonds were exaggerated.
