= James M. Bennett =

American lawyer

Personal details
- Born: April 11, 1948 (age 78) U.S.A.
- Party: NonpartisanZander
- Occupation: Attorney and political activist
- Website: Jim Bennett's website

James M. Bennett (born April 11, 1948) is a New Jersey–based nonpartisan activist for FairTax, a tax reform strategy in the United States which would replace the Internal Revenue Service with a tax on consumption. He promotes FairTax on newsradio talk programs, television shows, He speaks at workshops and local conferences, and manages an Internet-based promotional campaign. He has written hundreds of letters to the editor to publications such as The Atlantic explaining his advocacy of FairTax and urging citizens to write their congressperson to support FairTax bills in the House called H.R.25 and Senate called S.1025. He is the co-director of the New Jersey branch of Americans for Fair Taxation. He is a lawyer and lives in Summit, New Jersey.

Regarding his advocacy of FairTax, Bennett describes himself as nonpartisan and, along with the FairTax organization, does not support either the Democratic or Republican party but advocates FairTax to leaders of both political parties. Bennett, in a television interview, explained "Americans for Fair Taxation is a nonprofit grassroots organization that is nonpartisan and it concentrates on one issue and its purpose is to educate the public about the FairTax act." He conducted a letter writing campaign to try to persuade members of Congress to reform the tax code. He conducts seminars to explain FairTax to people. He participates in booths at local New Jersey town fairs. Bennett has advocated FairTax to legislative assistants of New Jersey legislators such as Senator Frank Lautenberg.
