= JPET =

JPET may refer to:

- Journal of Pharmacology and Experimental Therapeutics
- Journal of Public Economic Theory
- Jagiellonian-PET TOMOGRAPHY
