= Fare tax =

Fare tax may refer to:

- FairTax, a tax reform proposal in the United States
- Fare paid for taxicabs or on other public transport
- Taxes on airfare by an airline or an airport
