= Wikirating =

Collaborative platform for credit ratings

- Company type: Nonprofit
- Available in: English
- Headquarters: Zurich, Switzerland
- Creators: Dorian Credé (founder); Erwan Salembier (co-founder)
- Website: www.wikirating.com
- Commercial: No
- Registration: Optional (required only for certain tasks such as editing protected pages, creating pages or uploading files)
- Launched: October 3, 2011; 14 years ago
- Current status: Inactive
- Content license: Creative Commons

Wikirating was a free, collaborative platform for credit ratings that aims to provide a transparent source for credit ratings of countries, companies and structured products. It is the first independent rating platform mainly based on community's contributions to feed data and information to establish independent, impartial and transparent ratings.

== History ==
Development of the platform started in spring 2010 by Austrian mathematician Dorian Credé and his colleague Erwan Salembier. The platform, which is based on the MediaWiki framework, went online in October 2011. By the end of 2011, around 2100 users had contributed ratings. In February 2012 Salembier left Wikirating, and in November 2012 the US not-for-profit rating provider Public Sector Credit Solutions published its open-source framework on the platform.

== Rating scheme ==
Wikirating uses a similar rating scheme as traditional credit rating agencies, ranging from "AAA" (highest rating) to "D" (default).

== Rating methods ==
The platform offers three rating methods.

=== Poll method ===
Wikirating users can vote on the rating of each country or company. Voting is limited to one vote each to prevent manipulation.

=== Sovereign Wikirating Index ===
The Sovereign Wikirating Index (SWI) contains a transparent formula that takes into account various factors, believed to influence the creditworthiness of nations.

As of October 2013, the SWI contains the following five criteria (with weights):

- Public debt (in % of the GDP) — 50% weight
- Account balance (in % of the GDP) — 20% weight
- GDP growth rate — 10% weight
- Inflation rate — 10% weight
- Unemployment rate — 10% weight

The resulting value is adjusted by multiplying it with a "scaling factor", which is composed by the Human Development Index (HDI) (60% weight) and the Corruption Perceptions Index (40% weight).

Calculations

Each criterion is calibrated with respect to the relative minimum and maximum value of all countries. For all criteria, a threshold value is defined in order to avoid distorted values. The calculated values are done with a spreadsheet.

The founders hope to engage the community to further improve the formula in order to provide optimal ratings.
