= George Zodrow =

Influential American Economist on Public Economics

- Born: June 5, 1950 (age 76); United States
- Occupation: Economist
- Known for: Research on public economics and taxation

Academic background
- Education: Rice University (B.A., M.M.E.); Princeton University (M.A., Ph.D.)

Academic work
- Institutions: Rice University
- Main interests: Public economics

George R. Zodrow (born June 5, 1950) is an American economist specializing in public economics. He is the Allyn R. and Gladys M. Cline Professor of Economics at Rice University and a Faculty Scholar at the Center for Tax and Budget Policy of the Baker Institute for Public Policy. He has also served as an International Research Fellow at the Centre on Business Taxation at Oxford University. Zodrow's research focuses on tax reform in the United States and in developing countries, national and international tax competition, state and local public finance especially the economic effects of the property tax, and dynamic computable general equilibrium models of U.S. tax reforms.

His 1986 paper with Peter Mieszkowski has been characterized as “canonical” and “classic” as it constructed what has been described as the “workhorse model” of capital tax competition. In recognition of his contributions to state and local fiscal policy and his work bridging academic research and public policy, Zodrow received the Steven D. Gold Award in 2009. At the award presentation, James M. Poterba of MIT, then president of the National Tax Association, described Zodrow as “a leading international expert on state and local tax policy” and said that he had conducted “pathbreaking research” on major state and local taxes, while also playing an influential role in tax-policy design in the United States and abroad. A 2008 study in the Journal of Public Economic Theory ranked him 25th among leading authors publishing in public economics journals.

== Education ==
Zodrow attended Rice University, graduating with a B.A. in mechanical engineering and economics in 1972, and a Master of Mechanical Engineering (M.M.E.) in 1973. After working as an engineer for several years, he pursued graduate work in economics, earning his M.A. (1977) and Ph.D. (1980) from Princeton University. His doctoral dissertation, Optimal Tax Reform: The Case of Property Tax Equalization, was prepared under advisers David Bradford and Wallace Oates. It won the 1980 National Tax Association Annual Competition for Outstanding Doctoral Dissertations, where economist Helen F. Ladd argued that it made “a significant contribution to the theory of taxation,” providing “a useful framework for the analysis of other reform proposals.”

== Career ==
Zodrow joined the faculty at Rice University in 1979 as an assistant professor, and was appointed a full professor in 1991. He served two separate terms as the Chair of the Rice Economics Department, first from 1995 to 2000 and again from 2019 to 2022.

From 1984 to 1985, Zodrow was a visiting financial economist at the U.S. Treasury Office of Tax Analysis and participated in the preparation of "Treasury I," the study that served as the precursor to the much-heralded Tax Reform Act of 1986. He has since acted as a consultant on tax reform issues for the Joint Committee on Taxation, the U.S. Treasury Department, the World Bank, and the International Monetary Fund, as well as to numerous private organizations. His international advisory work has spanned tax policy projects in numerous countries, including Aruba, Brazil, Bolivia, Bulgaria, Burundi, Canada, China, Colombia, Egypt, Guatemala, Mexico, New Zealand, Russia, Venezuela, and Zambia. He has also served as an expert witness on several court cases involving tax issues.

Zodrow was an editor of the National Tax Journal from 2007 to 2016 and the editor of the Policy Watch section of International Tax and Public Finance from 2002-2006. He has served on the Board of Directors of the National Tax Association and is currently on the editorial boards of the National Tax Journal and Public Finance Review.

== Research and publications ==
Zodrow has published over a hundred articles in numerous academic journals and collective volumes, and written or edited ten books on taxation, often in collaboration with various colleagues, especially Peter Mieszkowski, Charles McLure, and John Diamond.

In 2008, a study in the Journal of Public Economic Theory ranked Zodrow 25th among the top authors in public economics journals. The following year, he received the Steven D. Gold Award, an honor recognizing contributions to state and local fiscal policy and the connection between academic research and public policymaking. Presenting the award, James M. Poterba of MIT emphasized Zodrow’s work across major state and local taxes and his influence on tax-policy design in the United States and abroad.

In 2014, State Tax Notes columnist Billy Hamilton published an extended interview with Zodrow, introducing him as “one of the country’s most respected experts” on state and local finance as well as federal and international tax reform. The interview discussed how academic public-finance research can inform practical tax policy. Hamilton highlighted Zodrow’s views on the property tax, sales and income taxation, tax competition, and the prospects for federal tax reform, while also drawing on Zodrow’s experience advising policymakers and working on earlier federal tax reform efforts.

=== Tax Competition ===
Zodrow's 1986 paper co-authored with Mieszkowski, "Pigou, Tiebout, Property Taxation and the Under-Provision of Local Public Goods," introduced what became a foundational model in the international tax competition literature. In their 2013 Handbook of Public Economics survey, Michael Keen and Kai Konrad wrote that “the formal literature on tax competition is largely rooted in an elegant model developed by Zodrow and Mieszkowski (1986) and Wilson (1986), the influence of which pervades the literature.” In a 2004 review in the Journal of Public Economics, Wilson and David Wildasin likewise referred to the Zodrow–Mieszkowski framework as the “standard model” of tax competition and noted that it had been “used extensively in the literature.”

=== Property Taxation ===
Zodrow's research on the property tax, much of which was also with Mieszkowski and focuses on the incidence of the tax, has been featured in many discussions of the effects of the property tax. Their work helped develop and reformulate the capital-tax view, which analyzes the property tax as a tax on capital that can affect the allocation of investment across jurisdictions and the provision of local public services. Their 1986 reformulation incorporated interjurisdictional competition, endogenous public-service provision, residential sorting, and land-use constraints into the analysis of property-tax incidence. This work became part of a broader debate with the benefit-tax view, which interprets the property tax more like a payment for local public services. Later literature by Fischel, Nechyba, Oates and Fischel, Schleicher, and others has continued to discuss these competing interpretations of property-tax incidence and their implications for local public finance.

=== Federal Tax Reform ===
Zodrow has also worked on transitional issues in tax reform and examined the relative merits of income and consumption tax bases. His general equilibrium tax reform modeling with John W. Diamond resulted in the development of the Diamond–Zodrow model, which was featured in the Handbook of Computable General Equilibrium Modeling and has been used to analyze a wide variety of tax reform proposals, most recently various approaches to carbon taxation.

== Selected articles ==
- "Pigou, Tiebout, Property Taxation and the Under-Provision of Local Public Goods,” (with Peter Mieszkowsi), Journal of Urban Economics, 1986, 19 (3): 356–370.
- “Optimal Tax Reform in the Presence of Adjustment Costs,” Journal of Public Economics, 1985, 27 (2): 211-230.
- "The New View of the Property Tax: A Reformulation," (with Peter Mieszkowski), Regional Science and Urban Economics, 1986, 16 (3): 309–327.
- “On the Traditional and New Views of Dividend Taxation." National Tax Journal, 1991, 44 (4): 497–509.
- "The Property Tax as a Capital Tax: A Room with Three Views." National Tax Journal, 2001, 54 (1): 139–156.
- "Dynamic Overlapping Generations CGE Models and the Analysis of Tax Policy: The Diamond-Zodrow Model," (with John Diamond), Handbook of Computable General Equilibrium Modeling, edited by Peter Dixon and Dale Jorgenson, 2013, 743–813.
- “75 Years of Research on the Property Tax,” National Tax Journal, 2023, 76 (4), 909-940.

== Selected books ==
- Advanced Introduction to Taxation, Elgar Advanced Introductions, Edward Elgar Publishing, 2025.
- Prospects for Economic Growth in the United States, edited with John W. Diamond, Cambridge University Press, 2021.
- Taxation in Theory and Practice: Selected Essays of George R. Zodrow. World Scientific Press, London, 2020.
- State Sales and Income Taxes: An Economic Analysis, Texas A&M University Press, 1999.
- A Modern Guide to Property and Land Taxation (Edward Elgar Publishing, forthcoming).
