= Kučinić =

Kučinić (pronounced [kǔtʃinitɕ]), often anglicized to Kucinich (pronounced /kuːˈsɪnɪtʃ/ koo-SIN-itch) is a Croatian family name. Notable persons with that surname include:

- Dennis Kucinich (born 1946), American politician
- Elizabeth Kucinich (née Harper; born 1977), director of public affairs for the Physicians Committee for Responsible Medicine, wife of Dennis
- Jackie Kucinich (born 1981), American reporter, daughter of Dennis
