= FairTax =

Proposal to reform United States tax code

FairTax is a fixed rate sales tax proposal introduced as bill H.R. 25 in the United States Congress every year since 2005. The Fair Tax Act calls for elimination of the Internal Revenue Service and sets the stage for repeal of the Sixteenth Amendment to the United States Constitution. H.R. 25 would eliminate all federal income taxes (including the alternative minimum tax, corporate income taxes, and capital gains taxes), payroll taxes (including Social Security and Medicare taxes), gift taxes, and estate taxes, replacing every extant federal taxes with a single consumption tax levied on retail sales.

The Fair Tax Act (H.R. 25/S. 18) would apply a fixed rate sales tax at the point of sale on all new, final goods and services purchased for household consumption. The proposal also specifies a monthly payment made to all households based on household size. Called a "prebate," the monthly payment offsets the regressive nature of a sales tax up to the poverty level. First introduced into the United States Congress in 1999, a number of congressional committees have heard testimony on the bill; however, it did not move from committee. A campaign in 2005 for the FairTax proposal involved Leo Linbeck and the Fairtax.org. Talk radio personality Neal Boortz and Georgia Congressman John Linder published The FairTax Book in 2005 and additional visibility was gained in the 2008 presidential campaign.

As defined in the proposed legislation, the initial sales tax rate is 30% (i.e. a purchase of $100 would incur a sales tax of $30, resulting in a total price to the consumer of $130). Advocates promote this as a 23% tax inclusive rate based on the total amount paid including the tax, which is the method currently used to calculate income tax liability. In subsequent years the rate could adjust annually based on federal receipts in the previous fiscal year. With the rebate taken into consideration, the FairTax would be progressive on consumption, but would still be regressive on income (since consumption as a percentage of income falls at higher income levels). Opponents argue this would accordingly decrease the tax burden on high-income earners and increase it on the lower class earners. Supporters contend that the plan would effectively tax wealth, increase purchasing power and decrease tax burdens by broadening the tax base.

Advocates expect a consumption tax to increase savings and investment, ease tax compliance and increase economic growth, increase incentives for international business to locate in the United States and increase U.S. competitiveness in international trade. The plan would provide transparency for funding the federal government. Supporters believe it would increase civil liberties, benefit the environment, and effectively tax illegal activity and illegal aliens present in the country, as well as tourists' expenditures. Critics contend that a consumption tax of this size would be extremely difficult to collect, would lead to pervasive tax evasion, and raise less revenue than the current tax system, leading to an increased budget deficit. The proposed Fairtax might cause removal of tax deduction incentives, transition effects on after-tax savings, incentives on credit use and the loss of tax advantages to state and local bonds. It also includes a sunset clause if the 16th Amendment to the U.S. Constitution is not repealed within seven years of its enactment.

== Legislative overview and history ==
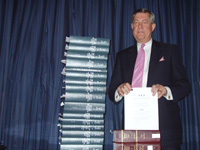
Rep John Linder holding the 133 page Fair Tax Act of 2007 in contrast to the then-current U.S. tax code and IRS regulations

The legislation would remove the Internal Revenue Service (after three years), and establish Excise Tax and Sales Tax bureaus in the Department of the Treasury. The states are granted the primary authority for the collection of sales tax revenues and the remittance of such revenues to the Treasury. The plan was created by Americans For Fair Taxation, an advocacy group formed to change the tax system. The group states that, together with economists, it developed the plan and the name "Fair Tax", based on interviews, polls, and focus groups of the general public. The FairTax legislation has been introduced in the House by Georgia Republicans John Linder (1999–2010) and Rob Woodall (2011–2014), while being introduced in the Senate by Georgia Republican Saxby Chambliss (2003–2014).

Linder first introduced the Fair Tax Act (H.R. 2525) on July 14, 1999, to the 106th United States Congress and a substantially similar bill has been reintroduced in each subsequent session of Congress. The bill attracted a total of fifty-six House and Senate cosponsors in the 108th Congress, sixty-one in the 109th, 76 in the 110th, 70 in the 111th, 78 in the 112th, 83 in the 113th (H.R. 25/S. 122), 81 in the 114th (H.R. 25/S. 155), 51 in the 115th (H.R. 25/S. 18), 33 in the 116th (H.R. 25), and 30 in the 117th (H.R. 25). Former Speaker of the House Dennis Hastert (Republican) had cosponsored the bill in the 109th–110th Congress, but it has not received support from the Democratic leadership. Democratic Representative Collin Peterson of Minnesota and Democratic Senator Zell Miller of Georgia cosponsored and introduced the bill in the 108th Congress, but Peterson has left the House of Representatives and Miller has left the Senate. In the 109th–111th Congress, Representative Dan Boren was the only Democrat to cosponsor the bill. A number of congressional committees have heard testimony on the FairTax, but it has not moved from committee since its introduction in 1999. The legislation was also discussed with President George W. Bush and his Secretary of the Treasury Henry M. Paulson.

To become law, the bill will need to be included in a final version of tax legislation from the U.S. House Committee on Ways and Means, pass both the House and the Senate, and finally be signed by the President. In 2005, President Bush established an advisory panel on tax reform that examined several national sales tax variants including aspects of the FairTax and noted several concerns. These included uncertainties as to the revenue that would be generated, and difficulties of enforcement and administration, which made this type of tax undesirable to recommend in their final report. The panel did not examine the FairTax as proposed in the legislation. The FairTax received visibility in the 2008 presidential election on the issue of taxes and the IRS, with several candidates supporting the bill. A poll in 2009 by Rasmussen Reports found that 43% of Americans would support a national sales tax replacement, with 38% opposed to the idea; the sales tax was viewed as fairer by 52% of Republicans, 44% of Democrats, and 49% of Independents. President Barack Obama did not support the bill, arguing for more progressive changes to the income and payroll tax systems.

== Tax rate ==
The sales tax rate, as defined in the legislation for the first year, is 23% of the total payment including the tax ($23 of every $100 spent in total—calculated similar to income taxes). This would be equivalent to a 30% traditional U.S. sales tax ($23 on top of every $77 spent—$100 total, or $30 on top of every $100 spent—$130 total). After the first year of implementation, this rate is automatically adjusted annually using a predefined formula reflecting actual federal receipts in the previous fiscal year.

The effective tax rate for any household would be variable due to the fixed monthly tax rebate that are used to rebate taxes paid on purchases up to the poverty level. The tax would be levied on all U.S. retail sales for personal consumption on new goods and services. Critics argue that the sales tax rate defined in the legislation would not be revenue neutral (that is, it would collect less for the government than the current tax system), and thus would increase the budget deficit, unless government spending were equally reduced.

=== Sales tax rate ===
During the first year of implementation, the FairTax legislation would apply a 23% federal retail sales tax on the total transaction value of a purchase; in other words, consumers pay to the government twenty-three cents of every dollar spent in total (sometimes called tax-inclusive, and presented this way to provide a direct comparison with individual income and employment taxes which reduce a person's available money before they can make purchases). The equivalent assessed tax rate is 30% if the FairTax is applied to the pre-tax price of a good like traditional U.S. state sales taxes (sometimes called tax-exclusive; this rate is not directly comparable with existing income and employment taxes). After the first year of implementation, this tax rate would be automatically adjusted annually using a formula specified in the legislation that reflects actual federal receipts in the previous fiscal year.

=== Effective tax rate ===
A household's effective tax rate on consumption would vary with the annual expenditures on taxable items and the fixed monthly tax rebate. The rebate would have the greatest effect at low spending levels, where they could lower a household's effective rate to zero or below. The lowest effective tax rate under the FairTax could be negative due to the rebate for households with annual spending amounts below poverty level spending for a specified household size. At higher spending levels, the rebate has less impact, and a household's effective tax rate would approach 23% of total spending. A person spending at the poverty level would have an effective tax rate of 0%, whereas someone spending at four times the poverty level would have an effective tax rate of 17.2%. Buying or otherwise receiving items and services not subject to federal taxation (such as a used home or car) can contribute towards a lower effective tax rate. The total amount of spending and the proportion of spending allocated to taxable items would determine a household's effective tax rate on consumption. If a rate is calculated on income, instead of the tax base, the percentage could exceed the statutory tax rate in a given year.

=== Monthly tax rebate ===
Proposed 2015 FairTax Prebate Schedule
One adult household				Two adult household			
Family Size	Annual Consumption Allowance	Annual Prebate	Monthly Prebate	Family Size	Annual Consumption Allowance	Annual Prebate	Monthly Prebate
1 person	$11,770	$2,707	$226	couple	$23,540	$5,414	$451
and 1 child	$15,930	$3,664	$305	and 1 child	$27,700	$6,371	$531
and 2 children	$20,090	$4,621	$385	and 2 children	$31,860	$7,328	$611
and 3 children	$24,250	$5,578	$465	and 3 children	$36,020	$8,285	$690
and 4 children	$28,410	$6,534	$545	and 4 children	$40,180	$9,241	$770
and 5 children	$32,570	$7,491	$624	and 5 children	$44,340	$10,198	$850
and 6 children	$36,490	$8,393	$699	and 6 children	$48,500	$11,155	$930
and 7 children	$40,890	$9,405	$784	and 7 children	$52,660	$12,112	$1,009
The annual consumption allowance is based on the 2015 DHHS Poverty Guidelines as published in the Federal Register, January 22, 2015. There is no marriage penalty as the couple amount is twice the amount that a single adult receives. For families/households with more than 8 persons, add $4,160 to the annual consumption allowance for each additional person. The annual consumption allowance is the amount of spending that is "untaxed" under the FairTax.

Under the FairTax, family households of lawful U.S. residents would be eligible to receive a "Family Consumption Allowance" (FCA) based on family size (regardless of income) that is equal to the estimated total FairTax paid on poverty level spending according to the poverty guidelines published by the U.S. Department of Health and Human Services. The FCA is a tax rebate (known as a "prebate" as it would be an advance) paid in twelve monthly installments, adjusted for inflation. The rebate is meant to eliminate the taxation of household necessities and make the plan progressive. Households would register once a year with their sales tax administering authority, providing the names and social security numbers of each household member. The Social Security Administration would disburse the monthly rebate payments in the form of a paper check via U.S. Mail, an electronic funds transfer to a bank account, or a "smartcard" that can be used like a debit card.

Opponents of the plan criticize this tax rebate due to its costs. Economists at the Beacon Hill Institute estimated the overall rebate cost to be $489 billion (assuming 100% participation). In addition, economist Bruce Bartlett has argued that the rebate would create a large opportunity for fraud, treats children disparately, and would constitute a welfare payment regardless of need.

The President's Advisory Panel for Federal Tax Reform cited the rebate as one of their chief concerns when analyzing their national sales tax, stating that it would be the largest entitlement program in American history, and contending that it would "make most American families dependent on monthly checks from the federal government". Estimated by the advisory panel at approximately $600 billion, "the Prebate program would cost more than all budgeted spending in 2006 on the Departments of Agriculture, Commerce, Defense, Education, Energy, Homeland Security, Housing and Urban Development, and Interior combined." Proponents point out that income tax deductions, tax preferences, loopholes, credits, etc. under the current system was estimated at $945 billion by the Joint Committee on Taxation. They argue this is $456 billion more than the FairTax "entitlement" (tax refund) would spend to cover each person's tax expenses up to the poverty level. In addition, it was estimated for 2005 that the Internal Revenue Service was already sending out $270 billion in refund checks.

=== Presentation of tax rate ===
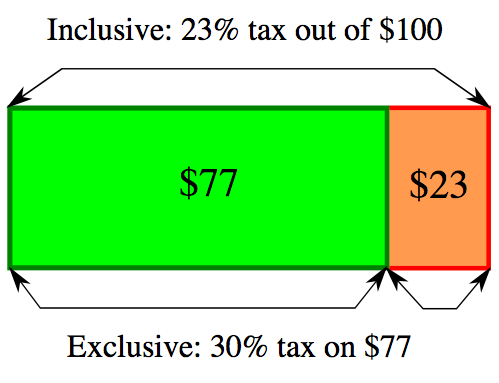
Mathematically, a 23% tax out of $100 yields approximately the same as a 30% tax on $77.

Sales and income taxes behave differently due to differing definitions of tax base, which can make comparisons between the two confusing. Under the existing individual income plus employment (Social Security; Medicare; Medicaid) tax formula, taxes to be paid are included in the base on which the tax rate is imposed (known as tax-inclusive). If an individual's gross income is $100 and the sum of their income plus employment tax rate is 23%, taxes owed equals $23. Traditional state sales taxes are imposed on a tax base equal to the pre-tax portion of a good's price (known as tax-exclusive). A good priced at $77 with a 30% sales tax rate yields $23 in taxes owed. To adjust an inclusive rate to an exclusive rate, divide the given rate by one minus that rate (i.e. $0.23/(1 - 0.23) = 0.23/0.77 = 0.30$ ).

The FairTax statutory rate, unlike most U.S. state-level sales taxes, is presented on a tax base that includes the amount of FairTax paid. For example, a final after-tax price of $100 includes $23 of taxes. Although no such requirement is included in the text of the legislation, Congressman John Linder has stated that the FairTax would be implemented as an inclusive tax, which would include the tax in the retail price, not added on at checkout—an item on the shelf for five dollars would be five dollars total. The legislation requires the receipt to display the tax as 23% of the total. Linder states the FairTax is presented as a 23% tax rate for easy comparison to income and employment tax rates (the taxes it would be replacing). The plan's opponents call the semantics deceptive. FactCheck called the presentation misleading, saying that it hides the real truth of the tax rate. Bruce Bartlett stated that polls show tax reform support is extremely sensitive to the proposed rate, and called the presentation confusing and deceptive based on the conventional method of calculating sales taxes. Proponents believe it is both inaccurate and misleading to say that an income tax is 23% and the FairTax is 30% as it implies that the sales tax burden is higher.

=== Revenue neutrality ===
A key question surrounding the FairTax is whether the tax has the ability to be revenue-neutral; that is, whether the tax would result in an increase or reduction in overall federal tax revenues. Economists, advisory groups, and political advocacy groups disagree about the tax rate required for the FairTax to be truly revenue-neutral. Various analysts use different assumptions, time-frames, and methods resulting in dramatically different tax rates making direct comparison among the studies difficult. The choice between static or dynamic scoring further complicates any estimate of revenue-neutral rates.

A 2006 study published in Tax Notes by the Beacon Hill Institute at Suffolk University and Dr. Laurence Kotlikoff estimated the FairTax would be revenue-neutral for the tax year 2007 at a rate of 23.82% (31.27% tax-exclusive). The study states that purchasing power is transferred to state and local taxpayers from state and local governments. To recapture the lost revenue, state and local governments would have to raise tax rates or otherwise change tax laws in order to continue collecting the same real revenues from their taxpayers. The Argus Group and Arduin, Laffer & Moore Econometrics each published an analysis that defended the 23% rate. While proponents of the FairTax concede that the above studies did not explicitly account for tax evasion, they also claim that the studies did not altogether ignore tax evasion under the FairTax. These studies presumably incorporated some degree of tax evasion in their calculations by using National Income and Product Account based figures, which is argued to understate total household consumption. The studies also did not account for capital gains that may be realized by the U.S. government if consumer prices were allowed to rise, which would reduce the real value of nominal U.S. government debt. Nor did these studies account for any increased economic growth that many economists researching the plan believe would occur.

In contrast to the above studies, William G. Gale of the Brookings Institution published a study in Tax Notes that estimated a rate of 28.2% (39.3% tax-exclusive) for 2007 assuming full taxpayer compliance and an average rate of 31% (44% tax-exclusive) from 2006 to 2015 (assumes that the Bush tax cuts expire on schedule and accounts for the replacement of an additional $3 trillion collected through the Alternative Minimum Tax). The study also concluded that if the tax base were eroded by 10% due to tax evasion, tax avoidance, and/or legislative adjustments, the average rate would be 34% (53% tax-exclusive) for the 10-year period. A dynamic analysis in 2008 by the Baker Institute For Public Policy concluded that a 28% (38.9% tax-exclusive) rate would be revenue neutral for 2006. The President's Advisory Panel for Federal Tax Reform performed a 2006 analysis to replace the individual and corporate income tax with a retail sales tax and estimated the rate to be 25% (34% tax-exclusive) assuming 15% tax evasion, and 33% (49% tax-exclusive) with 30% tax evasion. The rate would need to be substantially higher to replace the additional taxes replaced by the FairTax (payroll, estate, and gift taxes). Beacon Hill Institute, FairTax.org, and Kotlikoff criticized the President's Advisory Panel's study as having allegedly altered the terms of the FairTax, using unsound methodology, and/or failing to fully explain their calculations.

== Taxable items and exemptions ==
The tax would be levied once at the final retail sale for personal consumption on new goods and services. Purchases of used items, exports and all business transactions would not be taxed. Also excluded are investments, such as purchases of stock, corporate mergers and acquisitions and capital investments. Savings and education tuition expenses would be exempt as they would be considered an investment (rather than final consumption).

A good would be considered "used" and not taxable if a consumer already owns it before the FairTax takes effect or if the FairTax has been paid previously on the good, which may be different from the item being sold previously. Personal services such as health care, legal services, financial services, and auto repairs would be subject to the FairTax, as would renting apartments and other real property. Food, clothing, prescription drugs, and medical services would be taxed. (State sales taxes generally exempt these types of basic-need items in an effort to reduce the tax burden on low-income families. The FairTax would use a monthly rebate system instead of the common state exclusions.) Internet purchases would be taxed, as would retail international purchases (such as a boat or car) that are imported to the United States (collected by the U.S. Customs and Border Protection).

== Distribution of tax burden ==
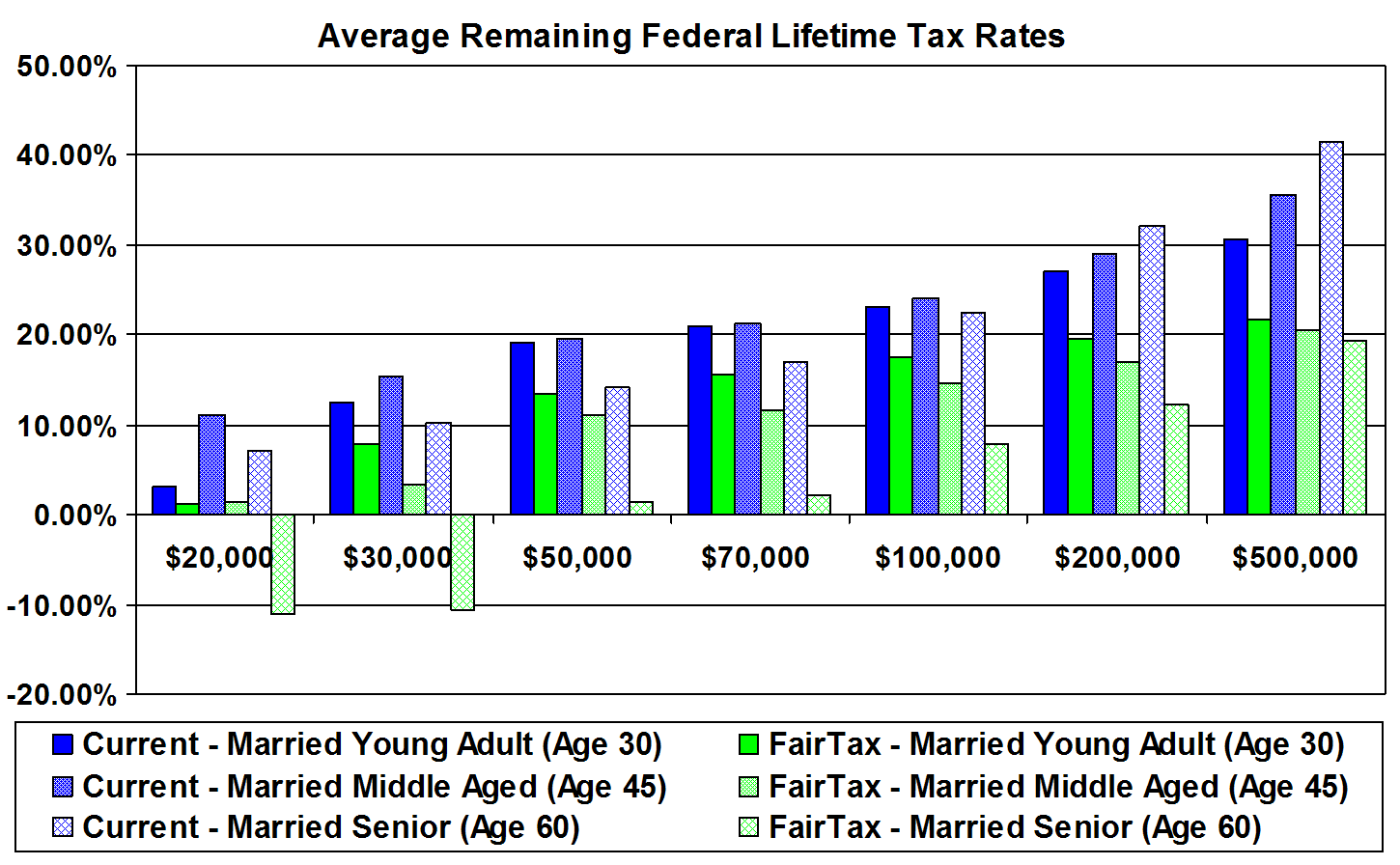
Working paper by Kotlikoff and Rapson of the FairTax. Lower rates claimed on workers from a larger tax base, replacing regressive taxes, and wealth taxation.

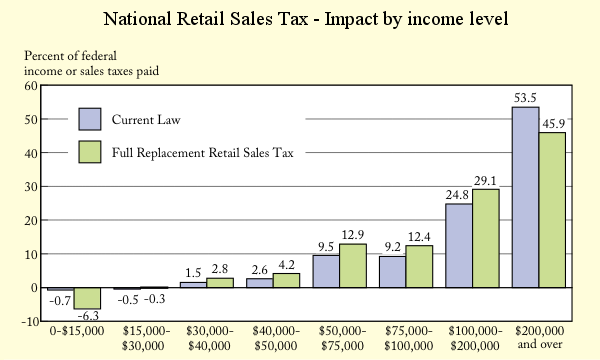
President's Advisory Panel's analysis of a hybrid National Sales Tax. Higher rates claimed on the middle-class for an income tax replacement (excludes payroll, estate, and gift taxes replaced under the FairTax).

The FairTax's effect on the distribution of taxation or tax incidence (the effect on the distribution of economic welfare) is a point of dispute. The plan's supporters argue that the tax would broaden the tax base, that it would be progressive, and that it would decrease tax burdens and start taxing wealth (reducing the economic gap). Opponents argue that a national sales tax would be inherently regressive and would decrease tax burdens paid by high-income individuals. A person earning $2 million a year could live well spending $1 million, and as a result pay a mere 11% of that year's income in taxes. Households at the lower end of the income scale spend almost all their income, while households at the higher end are more likely to devote a portion of income to saving. Therefore, according to economist William G. Gale, the percentage of income taxed is regressive at higher income levels (as consumption falls as a percentage of income).

Income earned and saved would not be taxed until spent under the proposal. Households at the extreme high end of consumption often finance their purchases out of savings, not income. Economist Laurence Kotlikoff states that the FairTax could make the tax system much more progressive and generationally equitable, and argues that taxing consumption is effectively the same as taxing wages plus taxing wealth. A household of three persons (this example will use two adults plus one child; the rebate does not consider marital status) spending $30,000 a year on taxable items would devote about 3.4% of total spending ([$6,900 tax minus $5,888 rebate]/$30,000 spending) to the FairTax after the rebate. The same household spending $125,000 on taxable items would spend around 18.3% ([$28,750 tax minus $5,888 rebate]/$125,000 spending) on the FairTax. At higher spending levels, the rebate has less impact and the rate approaches 23% of total spending. Thus, according to economist Laurence Kotlikoff, the effective tax rate is progressive on consumption.

An unreviewed paper by Kotlikoff and David Rapson states that the FairTax would significantly reduce marginal taxes on work and saving, lowering overall average remaining lifetime tax burdens on current and future workers. A study by Kotlikoff and Sabine Jokisch concluded that the long-term effects of the FairTax would reward low-income households with 26.3% more purchasing power, middle-income households with 12.4% more purchasing power, and high-income households with 5% more purchasing power. The Beacon Hill Institute reported that the FairTax would make the federal tax system more progressive and would benefit the average individual in almost all expenditures deciles. In another study, they state the FairTax would offer the broadest tax base (an increase of over $2 trillion), which allows the FairTax to have a lower tax rate than current tax law.

Gale analyzed a national sales tax (though different from the FairTax in several aspects) and reported that the overall tax burden on middle-income Americans would increase while the tax burden on the top 1% would drop. A study by the Beacon Hill Institute reported that the FairTax may have a negative effect on the well-being of mid-income earners for several years after implementation. According to the President's Advisory Panel for Federal Tax Reform report, which compared the individual and corporate income tax (excluding other taxes the FairTax replaces) to a sales tax with rebate, the percentage of federal taxes paid by those earning from $15,000–$50,000 would rise from 3.6% to 6.7%, while the burden on those earning more than $200,000 would fall from 53.5% to 45.9%. The report states that the top 5% of earners would see their burden decrease from 58.6% to 37.4%. FairTax supporters argue that replacing the regressive payroll tax (a 15.3% total tax not included in the Tax Panel study; payroll taxes include a 12.4% Social Security tax on wages up to $97,500 and a 2.9% Medicare tax, a 15.3% total tax that is often split between employee and employer) greatly changes the tax distribution, and that the FairTax would relieve the tax burden on middle-class workers.

== Predicted effects ==
The predicted effects of the FairTax are a source of disagreement among economists and other analysts. According to Money magazine, while many economists and tax experts support the idea of a consumption tax, many of them view the FairTax proposal as having serious problems with evasion and revenue neutrality. Some economists argue that a consumption tax (the FairTax is one such tax) would have a positive effect on economic growth, incentives for international business to locate in the U.S., and increased U.S. international competitiveness (border tax adjustment in global trade). The FairTax would be tax-free on mortgage interest (up to a basic interest rate) and donations, but some lawmakers have concerns about losing tax incentives on home ownership and charitable contributions. There is also concern about the effect on the income tax industry and the difficulty of repealing the Sixteenth Amendment (to prevent Congress from re-introducing an income tax).

=== Economic ===
Americans For Fair Taxation states the FairTax would boost the United States economy and offers a letter signed by eighty economists, including Nobel Laureate Vernon L. Smith, that have endorsed the plan. The Beacon Hill Institute estimated that within five years real GDP would increase 10.7% over the current system, domestic investment by 86.3%, capital stock by 9.3%, employment by 9.9%, real wages by 10.2%, and consumption by 1.8%. Arduin, Laffer & Moore Econometrics projected the economy as measured by GDP would be 2.4% higher in the first year and 11.3% higher by the 10th year than it would otherwise be. Economists Laurence Kotlikoff and Sabine Jokisch reported the incentive to work and save would increase; by 2030, the economy's capital stock would increase by 43.7% over the current system, output by 9.4%, and real wages by 11.5%. Economist John Golob estimates a consumption tax, like the FairTax, would bring long-term interest rates down by 25–35%. An analysis in 2008 by the Baker Institute For Public Policy indicated that the plan would generate significant overall macroeconomic improvement in both the short and long-term, but warned of transitional issues.

FairTax proponents argue that the proposal would provide tax burden visibility and reduce compliance and efficiency costs by 90%, returning a large share of money to the productive economy. The Beacon Hill Institute concluded that the FairTax would save $346.51 billion in administrative costs and would be a much more efficient taxation system. Bill Archer, former head of the House Ways and Means Committee, asked Princeton University Econometrics to survey 500 European and Asian companies regarding the effect on their business decisions if the United States enacted the FairTax. 400 of those companies stated they would build their next plant in the United States, and 100 companies said they would move their corporate headquarters to the United States. Supporters argue that the U.S. has the highest combined statutory corporate income tax rate among OECD countries along with being the only country with no border adjustment element in its tax system. Proponents state that because the FairTax eliminates corporate income taxes and is automatically border adjustable, the competitive tax advantage of foreign producers would be eliminated, immediately boosting U.S. competitiveness overseas and at home.

Opponents point to a study commissioned by the National Retail Federation in 2000 that found a national sales tax bill filed by Billy Tauzin, the Individual Tax Freedom Act (H.R. 2717), would bring a three-year decline in the economy, a four-year decline in employment and an eight-year decline in consumer spending. The Wall Street Journal columnist James Taranto states the FairTax is unsuited to take advantage of supply-side effects and would create a powerful disincentive to spend money. John Linder states an estimated $11 trillion is held in foreign accounts (largely for tax purposes), which he states would be repatriated back to U.S. banks if the FairTax were enacted, becoming available to U.S. capital markets, bringing down interest rates, and otherwise promoting economic growth in the United States. Attorney Allen Buckley states that a tremendous amount of wealth was already repatriated under law changes in 2004 and 2005. Buckley also argues that if the tax rate was significantly higher, the FairTax would discourage the consumption of new goods and hurt economic growth.

=== Transition ===
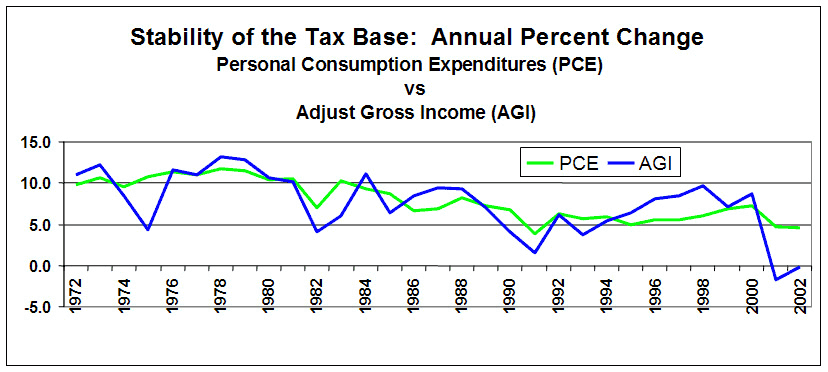
Stability of the tax base: a comparison of personal consumption expenditures and adjusted gross income

During the transition, many or most of the employees of the IRS (105,978 in 2005) would face loss of employment. The Beacon Hill Institute estimate is that the federal government would be able to cut $8 billion from the IRS budget of $11.01 billion (in 2007), reducing the size of federal tax administration by 73%. In addition, income tax preparers (many seasonal), tax lawyers, tax compliance staff in medium-to-large businesses, and software companies which sell tax preparation software could face significant drops, changes, or loss of employment. The bill would maintain the IRS for three years after implementation before completely decommissioning the agency, providing employees time to find other employment.

In the period before the FairTax is implemented, there could be a strong incentive for individuals to buy goods without the sales tax using credit. After the FairTax is in effect, the credit could be paid off using untaxed payroll. If credit incentives do not change, opponents of the FairTax worry it could exacerbate an existing consumer debt problem. Proponents of the FairTax state that this effect could also allow individuals to pay off their existing (pre-FairTax) debt more quickly, and studies suggest lower interest rates after FairTax passage.

Individuals under the current system who accumulated savings from ordinary income (by choosing not to spend their money when the income was earned) paid taxes on that income before it was placed in savings (such as a Roth IRA or CD). When individuals spend above the poverty level with money saved under the current system, that spending would be subject to the FairTax. People living through the transition may find both their earnings and their spending taxed. Critics have stated that the FairTax would result in unfair double taxation for savers and suggest it does not address the transition effect on some taxpayers who have accumulated significant savings from after-tax dollars, especially retirees who have finished their careers and switched to spending down their life savings. Supporters of the plan argue that the current system is no different, since compliance costs and "hidden taxes" embedded in the prices of goods and services cause savings to be "taxed" a second time already when spent. The rebate would supplement accrued savings, covering taxes up to the poverty level. The income taxes on capital gains, estates, social security and pension benefits would be eliminated under FairTax. In addition, the FairTax legislation adjusts Social Security benefits for changes in the price level, so a percentage increase in prices would result in an equal percentage increase to Social Security income. Supporters suggest these changes would offset paying the FairTax under transition conditions.

=== Other indirect effects ===
The FairTax would be tax free on mortgage interest up to the federal borrowing rate for like-term instruments as determined by the Treasury, but since savings, education, and other investments would be tax free under the plan, the FairTax could decrease the incentive to spend more on homes. An analysis in 2008 by the Baker Institute For Public Policy concluded that the FairTax would have significant transitional issues for the housing sector since the investment would no longer be tax-favored. In a 2007 study, the Beacon Hill Institute concluded that total charitable giving would increase under the FairTax, although increases in giving would not be distributed proportionately among the various types of charitable organizations. The FairTax may also affect state and local government debt as the federal income tax system provides tax advantages to municipal bonds. Proponents believe environmental benefits would result from the FairTax through environmental economics and the re-use and re-sale of used goods. Advocates argue the FairTax would provide an incentive for illegal immigrants to legalize as they would otherwise not receive the rebate. Proponents also believe that the FairTax would have positive effects on civil liberties that are sometimes charged against the income tax system, such as social inequality, economic inequality, financial privacy, self-incrimination, unreasonable search and seizure, burden of proof, and due process.

If the FairTax bill were passed, permanent elimination of income taxation would not be guaranteed; the FairTax bill would repeal much of the existing tax code, but the Sixteenth Amendment would remain in place. Preventing new legislation from reintroducing income taxation would require a repeal of the Sixteenth Amendment to the United States Constitution with a separate provision expressly prohibiting a federal income tax. This is referred to as an "aggressive repeal". Separate income taxes enforced by individual states would be unaffected by the federal repeal. Passing the FairTax would require only a simple majority in each house of the United States Congress along with the signature of the President, whereas enactment of a constitutional amendment must be approved by two thirds of each house of the Congress, and three-quarters of the individual U.S. states. It is therefore possible that passage of the FairTax bill would simply add another taxation system. If a new income tax bill were passed after the FairTax passage, a hybrid system could develop; albeit, there is nothing preventing a bill for a hybrid system today. To address this issue and preclude that possibility, in the 111th Congress John Linder introduced a contingent sunset provision in H.R. 25. It would require the repeal of the Sixteenth Amendment within 8 years after the implementation of the FairTax or, failing that, the FairTax would expire. Critics have also argued that a tax on state government consumption could be unconstitutional.

== Changes in the retail economy ==
Since the FairTax would not tax used goods, the value would be determined by the supply and demand in relation to new goods. The price differential/margins between used and new goods would stay consistent, as the cost and value of used goods are in direct relationship to the cost and value of the new goods. Because the U.S. tax system has a hidden effect on prices, it is expected that moving to the FairTax would decrease production costs from the removal of business taxes and compliance costs, which is predicted to offset a portion of the FairTax effect on prices.

=== Value of used goods ===
Since the FairTax would not tax used goods, some critics have argued that this would create a differential between the price of new and used goods, which may take years to equalize. Such a differential would certainly influence the sale of new goods like vehicles and homes. Similarly, some supporters have claimed that this would create an incentive to buy used goods, creating environmental benefits of re-use and re-sale. Conversely, it is argued that like the income tax system that contains embedded tax cost (see Theories of retail pricing), used goods would contain the embedded FairTax cost. While the FairTax would not be applied to the retail sales of used goods, the inherent value of a used good includes the taxes paid when the good was sold at retail. The value is determined by the supply and demand in relation to new goods. The price differential/margins between used and new goods should stay consistent, as the cost and value of used goods are in direct relationship to the cost and value of the new goods.

=== Theories of retail pricing ===
A supply and demand diagram illustrating taxes' effect on prices

Based on a study conducted by Dale Jorgenson, proponents state that production cost of domestic goods and services could decrease by approximately 22% on average after embedded tax costs are removed, leaving the sale nearly the same after taxes. The study concludes that producer prices would drop between 15% and 26% (depending on the type of good/service). Jorgenson's research included all income and payroll taxes in the embedded tax estimation, which assumes employee take-home pay (net income) remains unchanged from pre-FairTax levels. Price and wage changes after the FairTax would largely depend on the response of the Federal Reserve monetary authorities. Non-accommodation of the money supply would suggest retail prices and take home pay stay the same—embedded taxes are replaced by the FairTax. Full accommodation would suggest prices and incomes rise by the exclusive rate (i.e., 30%)—embedded taxes become windfall gains. Partial accommodation would suggest a varying degree in-between.

If businesses provided employees with gross pay (including income tax withholding and the employee share of payroll taxes), Arduin, Laffer & Moore Econometrics estimated production costs could decrease by a minimum of 11.55% (partial accommodation). This reduction would be from the removal of the remaining embedded costs, including corporate taxes, compliance costs, and the employer share of payroll taxes. This decrease would offset a portion of the FairTax amount reflected in retail prices, which proponents suggest as the most likely scenario. Bruce Bartlett states that it is unlikely that nominal wages would be reduced, which he believes would result in a recession, but that the Federal Reserve would likely increase the money supply to accommodate price increases. David Tuerck states "The monetary authorities would have to consider how the degree of accommodation, varying from none to full, would affect the overall economy and how it would affect the well-being of various groups such as retirees."

Social Security benefits would be adjusted for any price changes due to FairTax implementation. The Beacon Hill Institute states that it would not matter, apart from transition issues, whether prices fall or rise—the relative tax burden and tax rate remains the same. Decreases in production cost would not fully apply to imported products; so according to proponents, it would provide tax advantages for domestic production and increase U.S. competitiveness in global trade (see Border adjustability). To ease the transition, U.S. retailers will receive a tax credit equal to the FairTax on their inventory to allow for quick cost reduction. Retailers would also receive an administrative fee equal to the greater of $200 or 0.25% of the remitted tax as compensation for compliance costs, which amounts to around $5 billion.

== Effects on tax code compliance ==
One avenue for non-compliance is the black market. FairTax supporters state that the black market is largely untaxed under the current tax system. Economists estimate the underground economy in the United States to be between one and three trillion dollars annually. By imposing a sales tax, supporters argue that black market activity would be taxed when proceeds from such activity are spent on legal consumption. For example, the sale of illegal narcotics would remain untaxed (instead of being guilty of income tax evasion, drug dealers would be guilty of failing to submit sales tax), but they would face taxation when they used drug proceeds to buy consumer goods such as food, clothing, and cars. By taxing this previously untaxed money, FairTax supporters argue that non-filers would be paying part of their share of what would otherwise be uncollected income and payroll taxes.

Other economists and analysts have argued that the underground economy would continue to bear the same tax burden as before. They state that replacing the current tax system with a consumption tax would not change the tax revenue generated from the underground economy—while illicit income is not taxed directly, spending of income from illicit activity results in business income and wages that are taxed.

=== Tax compliance and evasion ===
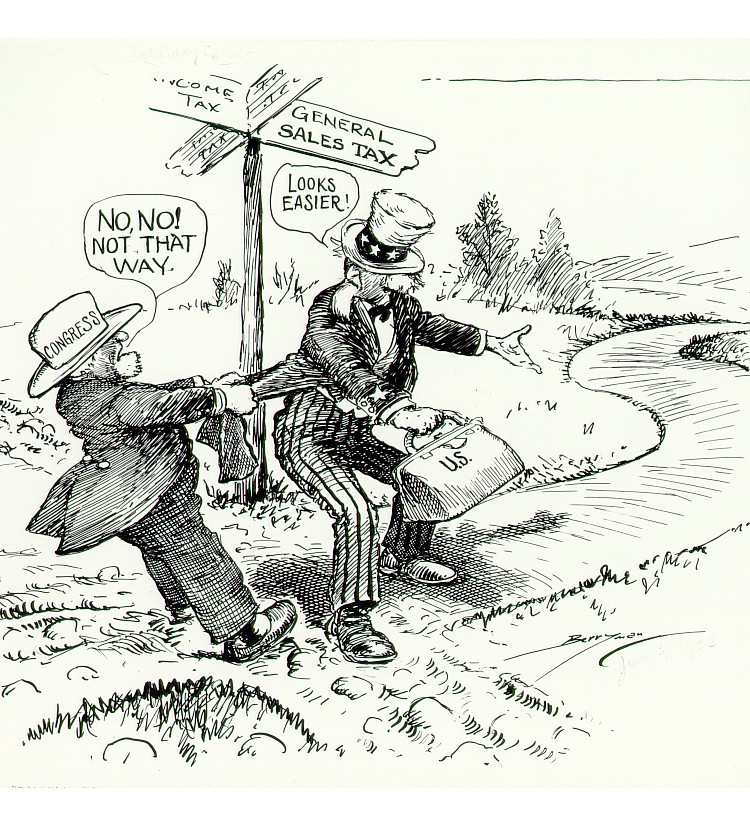
"No, No! Not That Way"—political cartoon from 1933 commenting on a general sales tax over an income tax

Proponents state the FairTax would reduce the number of tax filers by about 86% (from 100 million to 14 million) and reduce the filing complexity to a simplified state sales tax form. The Government Accountability Office (GAO), among others, have specifically identified the negative relationship between compliance costs and the number of focal points for collection. Under the FairTax, the federal government would be able to concentrate tax enforcement efforts on a single tax. Retailers would receive an administrative fee equal to the greater of $200 or 0.25% of the remitted tax as compensation for compliance costs. In addition, supporters state that the overwhelming majority of purchases occur in major retail outlets, which are very unlikely to evade the FairTax and risk losing their business licenses. Economic Census figures for 2002 show that 48.5% of merchandise sales are made by just 688 businesses ("Big-Box" retailers). 85.7% of all retail sales are made by 92,334 businesses, which is 3.6% of American companies. In the service sector, approximately 80% of sales are made by 1.2% of U.S. businesses.

The FairTax is a national tax, but can be administered by the states rather than a federal agency, which may have a bearing on compliance as the states' own agencies could monitor and audit businesses within that state. The 0.25% retained by the states amounts to $5 billion the states would have available for enforcement and administration. For example, California should receive over $500 million for enforcement and administration, which is more than the $327 million budget for the state's sales and excise taxes. Because the federal money paid to the states would be a percentage of the total revenue collected, John Linder claims the states would have an incentive to maximize collections. Proponents believe that states that choose to conform to the federal tax base would have advantages in enforcement, information sharing, and clear interstate revenue allocation rules. A study by the Beacon Hill Institute concluded that, on average, states could more than halve their sales tax rates and that state economies would benefit greatly from adopting a state-level FairTax.

FairTax opponents state that compliance decreases when taxes are not automatically withheld from citizens, and that massive tax evasion could result by collecting at just one point in the economic system. Compliance rates can also fall when taxed entities, rather than a third party, self-report their tax liability. For example, ordinary personal income taxes can be automatically withheld and are reported to the government by a third party. Taxes without withholding and with self-reporting, such as the FairTax, can see higher evasion rates. Economist Jane Gravelle of the Congressional Research Service found studies showing that evasion rates of sales taxes are often above 10%, even when the sales tax rate is in the single digits. Tax publications by the Organisation for Economic Co-operation and Development (OECD), IMF, and Brookings Institution have suggested that the upper limit for a sales tax is about 10% before incentives for evasion become too great to control. According to the GAO, 80% of state tax officials opposed a national sales tax as an intrusion on their tax base. Opponents also raise concerns of legal tax avoidance by spending and consuming outside of the U.S. (imported goods would be subject to collection by the U.S. Customs and Border Protection).

Economists from the University of Tennessee concluded that while there would be many desirable macroeconomic effects, adoption of a national retail sales tax would also have serious effects on state and local government finances. Economist Bruce Bartlett stated that if the states did not conform to the FairTax, they would have massive confusion and complication as to what is taxed by the state and what is taxed by the federal government. In addition, sales taxes have long exempted all but a few services because of the enormous difficulty in taxing intangibles—Bartlett suggests that the state may not have sufficient incentive to enforce the tax. University of Michigan economist Joel Slemrod argues that states would face significant issues in enforcing the tax. "Even at an average rate of around five percent, state sales taxes are difficult to administer." University of Virginia School of Law professor George Yin states that the FairTax could have evasion issues with export and import transactions. The President's Advisory Panel for Federal Tax Reform reported that if the federal government were to cease taxing income, states might choose to shift their revenue-raising to income. Absent the Internal Revenue Service, it would be more difficult for the states to maintain viable income tax systems.

=== Underground economy ===
Opponents of the FairTax argue that imposing a national retail sales tax would drive transactions underground and create a vast underground economy. Under a retail sales tax system, the purchase of intermediate goods and services that are factors of production are not taxed, since those goods would produce a final retail good that would be taxed. Individuals and businesses may be able to manipulate the tax system by claiming that purchases are for intermediate goods, when in fact they are final purchases that should be taxed. Proponents point out that a business is required to have a registered seller's certificate on file, and must keep complete records of all transactions for six years. Businesses must also record all taxable goods bought for seven years. They are required to report these sales every month (see Personal vs. business purchases). The government could also stipulate that all retail sellers provide buyers with a written receipt, regardless of transaction type (cash, credit, etc.), which would create a paper trail for evasion with risk of having the buyer turn them in (the FairTax authorizes a reward for reporting tax cheats).

While many economists and tax experts support a consumption tax, problems could arise with using a retail sales tax rather than a value added tax (VAT). A VAT imposes a tax on the value added at every intermediate step of production, so the goods reach the final consumer with much of the tax already in the price. The retail seller has little incentive to conceal retail sales, since he has already paid much of the good's tax. Retailers are unlikely to subsidize the consumer's tax evasion by concealing sales. In contrast, a retailer has paid no tax on goods under a sales tax system. This provides an incentive for retailers to conceal sales and engage in "tax arbitrage" by sharing some of the illicit tax savings with the final consumer. Citing evasion, Tim Worstall wrote in Forbes that Europe's 20-25% consumption taxes simply would not work if they were a sales tax: that's why they're all a VAT. Laurence Kotlikoff has stated that the government could compel firms to report, via 1099-type forms, their sales to other firms, which would provide the same records that arise under a VAT. In the United States, a general sales tax is imposed in 45 states plus the District of Columbia (accounting for over 97% of both population and economic output), which proponents argue provides a large infrastructure for taxing sales that many countries do not have.

=== Personal versus business purchases ===
Businesses would be required to submit monthly or quarterly reports (depending on sales volume) of taxable sales and sales tax collected on their monthly sales tax return. During audits, the business would have to produce invoices for the "business purchases" that they did not pay sales tax on, and would have to be able to show that they were genuine business expenses. Advocates state the significant 86% reduction in collection points would greatly increase the likelihood of business audits, making tax evasion behavior much more risky. Additionally, the FairTax legislation has several fines and penalties for non-compliance, and authorizes a mechanism for reporting tax cheats to obtain a reward. To prevent businesses from purchasing everything for their employees, in a family business for example, goods and services bought by the business for the employees that are not strictly for business use would be taxable. Health insurance or medical expenses would be an example where the business would have to pay the FairTax on these purchases. Taxable property and services purchased by a qualified non-profit or religious organization "for business purposes" would not be taxable.

== FairTax movement ==
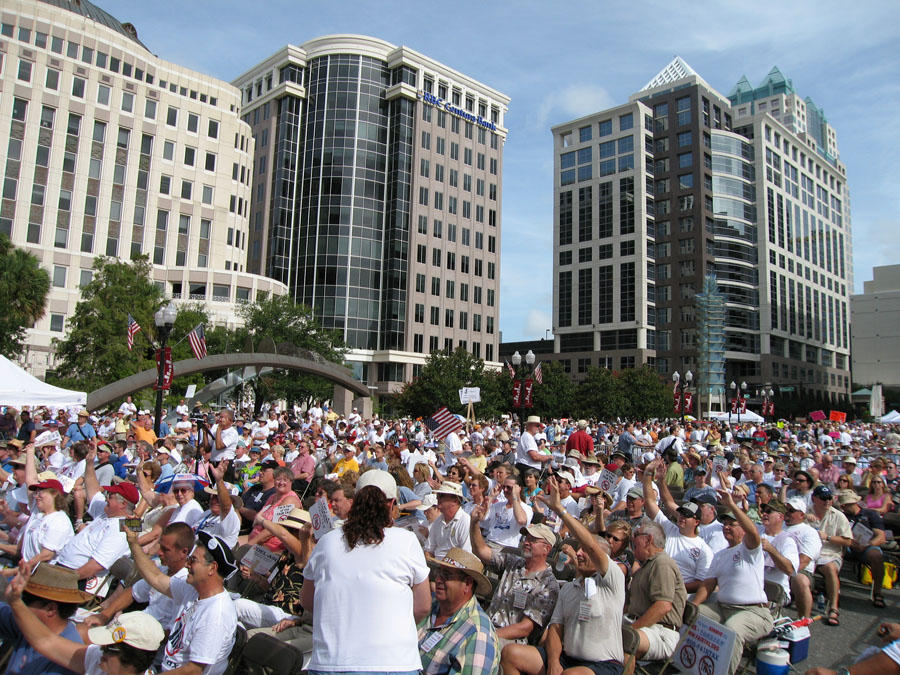
A FairTax rally in Orlando, Florida on July 28, 2006

The creation of the FairTax began with a group of businessmen from Houston, Texas, who initially financed what has become the political advocacy group Americans For Fair Taxation (AFFT), which has grown into a large tax reform movement. This organization, founded in 1994, claims to have spent over $20 million in research, marketing, lobbying, and organizing efforts over a ten-year period and is seeking to raise over $100 million more to promote the plan. AFFT includes a staff in Houston and a large group of volunteers who are working to get the FairTax enacted.

In 2007 Bruce Bartlett said the FairTax was devised by the Church of Scientology in the early 1990s, drawing comparisons between the tax policy and religious doctrine from the faith, whose creation myth holds that an evil alien ruler known as Xenu "used phony tax inspections as a guise for destroying his enemies." Representative John Linder told the Atlanta Journal-Constitution that Bartlett confused the FairTax movement with the Scientology-affiliated Citizens for an Alternative Tax System, which also seeks to abolish the federal income tax and replace it with a national retail sales tax. Leo Linbeck, AFFT Chairman and CEO, stated "As a founder of Americans For Fair Taxation, I can state categorically, however, that Scientology played no role in the founding, research or crafting of the legislation giving expression to the FairTax."

Much support has been achieved by talk radio personality Neal Boortz. Boortz's book (co-authored by Georgia Congressman John Linder) entitled The FairTax Book, explains the proposal and spent time atop The New York Times Best Seller list. Boortz stated that he donates his share of the proceeds to charity to promote the book. In addition, Boortz and Linder have organized several FairTax rallies to publicize support for the plan. Other media personalities have also assisted in growing grassroots support including former radio and TV talk show host Larry Elder, radio host and former candidate for the 2012 GOP Presidential Nomination Herman Cain, Fox News and radio host Sean Hannity, and Fox Business Host John Stossel. The FairTax received additional visibility as one of the issues in the 2008 presidential election. At a debate on June 30, 2007, several Republican candidates were asked about their position on the FairTax and many responded that they would sign the bill into law if elected. The most vocal promoters of the FairTax during the 2008 primary elections were Republican candidate Mike Huckabee and Democratic candidate Mike Gravel. The Internet, blogosphere, and electronic mailing lists have contributed to promoting, organizing, and gaining support for the FairTax. In the 2012 Republican presidential primary, and his ensuing Libertarian Party presidential run, former Governor of New Mexico and businessman Gary Johnson actively campaigned for the FairTax. Former CEO of Godfather's Pizza Herman Cain had promoted the FairTax as a final step in a multiple-phase tax reform. Outside of the United States, the Christian Heritage Party of Canada adopted a FairTax proposal as part of their 2011 election platform but has never been close to winning a seat in any election.

== See also ==
- Americans For Fair Taxation
- Consumption tax
- Debates within libertarianism
- Georgist land value tax
- Hall–Rabushka flat tax
- Optimal tax
- Single tax
- Tax reform
- Tax shift
