= Americans For Fair Taxation =

American political advocacy group

- Abbreviation: AFFT
- Formation: 1994
- Type: Advocacy group
- Location: Clearwater, Florida, U.S.
- Region served: United States
- President: Steven L. Hayes
- Website: FairTax.org

Americans For Fair Taxation (AFFT), also known as FairTax.org, is an American political advocacy group based in Clearwater, Florida which is dedicated to replacing the current income tax code of the United States with a national retail-level consumption tax.

It is made up of volunteers who are working to get the Fair Tax Act (H.R. 25/S. 122) enacted in the United States – a plan to replace all federal payroll and income taxes (both corporate and personal, including the Social Security tax) with a national retail sales tax and monthly tax "prebate" to households of citizens and legal resident non-citizens.

The organization claims it is the largest, single-issue grassroots taxpayers union in the United States, with over 800,000 supporters. The organization states that it subscribes to the ideals of simplicity, fairness, and freedom which they believe are embodied in the FairTax.

== History ==
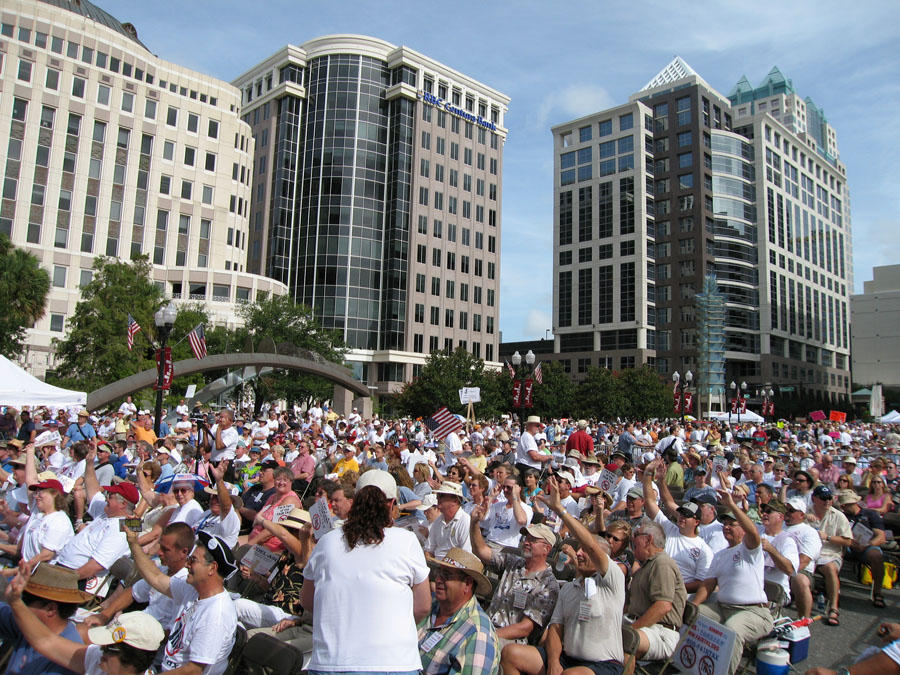
A FairTax rally in Orlando, Florida, sponsored by Americans For Fair Taxation on July 28, 2006

An Americans For Fair Taxation slogan

AFFT was founded in 1994 by three Houston businessmen, Jack Trotter, Bob McNair, and Leo Linbeck, Jr., who each pledged $1.5 million as seed money to hire tax experts to identify what they perceived as faults with the current tax system, to determine what American citizens would like to see in tax reform, and then to design the best system of taxation. The three went on to raise an additional $17 million to fund focus groups with citizens around the country and tax policy studies.

Some of the experts funded include:

- Bill Beach, The Heritage Foundation
- David Burton and Dan Mastromarco, University of Maryland and The Argus Group
- Dale Jorgenson, Harvard University
- Joseph Kahn, Massachusetts Institute of Technology
- Laurence Kotlikoff, Boston University
- Stephen Moore, The Cato Institute
- Jim Poterba, The National Bureau of Economic Research
- George Zodrow, Rice University and the Baker Institute for Public Policy

== Criticisms ==
Some have criticized Americans For Fair Taxation for the way that they present the FairTax plan. The most common critique is the presented FairTax rate of a 23% sales tax on the total transaction value of new retail goods and services purchases; consumers pay to the government 23 cents of every dollar spent (sometimes called tax inclusive). However, American sales taxes have historically been expressed as a percentage of the original sale price (sometimes called tax exclusive), this gives a 30% FairTax rate; items priced at $100 pre-tax cost $130 with the tax added. The use of the tax inclusive number in presenting the rate has been criticized as deceptive and by some as a "lie". However, AFFT argues that the 23% number represents a better comparison to income tax rates. Taxpayers in a 25% income tax bracket pay $25 in federal income taxes out of every $100 they earn. With the 23% FairTax, taxpayers would pay $23 in taxes out of every $100 they spend. This is also how the legislation is written – as an inclusive tax.

In 2007 Bruce Bartlett wrote that FairTax was originally devised by the Church of Scientology in the early 1990s as a way to get rid of the Internal Revenue Service. Representative John Linder told the Atlanta Journal-Constitution that Bartlett confused the FairTax movement with the Scientology-affiliated Citizens for an Alternative Tax System. Leo Linbeck, AFFT Chairman and CEO, stated "As a founder of Americans For Fair Taxation, I can state categorically, however, that Scientology played no role in the founding, research or crafting of the legislation giving expression to the FairTax."

== See also ==
- Americans for Tax Reform
- Americans Standing for the Simplification of the Estate Tax
- James M. Bennett
- Citizens for an Alternative Tax System
- Citizens for Tax Justice
- FairTax
- National Taxpayers Union
- Tax Foundation
