= Diane Lim =

Economist and writer

- Other names: Diane Lim Rogers
- Education: University of Michigan (BA); Brown University (MA); University of Virginia (PhD)
- Spouse: Bill Gale (2019–present)
- Children: 4
- Scientific career
- Fields: Economics
- Institutions: Pennsylvania State University; Congressional Budget Office; Urban Institute; Council of Economic Advisers; Joint Economic Committee; Ways and Means Committee; The Concord Coalition; The Pew Charitable Trusts; The Conference Board
- Website: Official website

Diane Lim is an economist and writer known for translating economic research into policy recommendations and for explaining economic issues for lay audiences. She has previously served as Senior Advisor at the Penn Wharton Budget Model, Principal at District Economics Group, principal economist for the Conference Board, Chief Economist for the Pew Charitable Trusts, Chief Economist for the Concord Coalition, Chief Economist for the House Budget Committee, Research Director of the Budgeting for National Priorities project of the Brookings Institution, Chief Economist for the House Ways and Means Committee Democrats, and Principal Economist for the Democratic members of the Joint Economic Committee. In 2009, The Wall Street Journal named her website, EconomistMom.com, one of the top economics blogs.

She also teaches tax and budget policy and behavioral economics courses at George Washington University and at Georgetown University. She is a past president of the National Tax Association, and has been a commentator on the Marketplace radio program.

== Research ==
Her current research focuses on the influence of public policies on household and business behavior and how individual-level characteristics and decisions drive macroeconomic trends. Her past publications focused on tax incidence, fiscal policy and the U.S. Federal budget.

=== Selected works ===
- Don Fullerton; Diane Lim Rogers (1993). Who bears the lifetime tax burden?. Washington, DC: Brookings Institution.
- Terry M. Dinan; Diane Lim Rogers (2002). "Distributional effects of carbon allowance trading: how government decisions determine winners and losers". National Tax Journal: 199–221.
