= William G. Gale =

American economist

Bill Gale
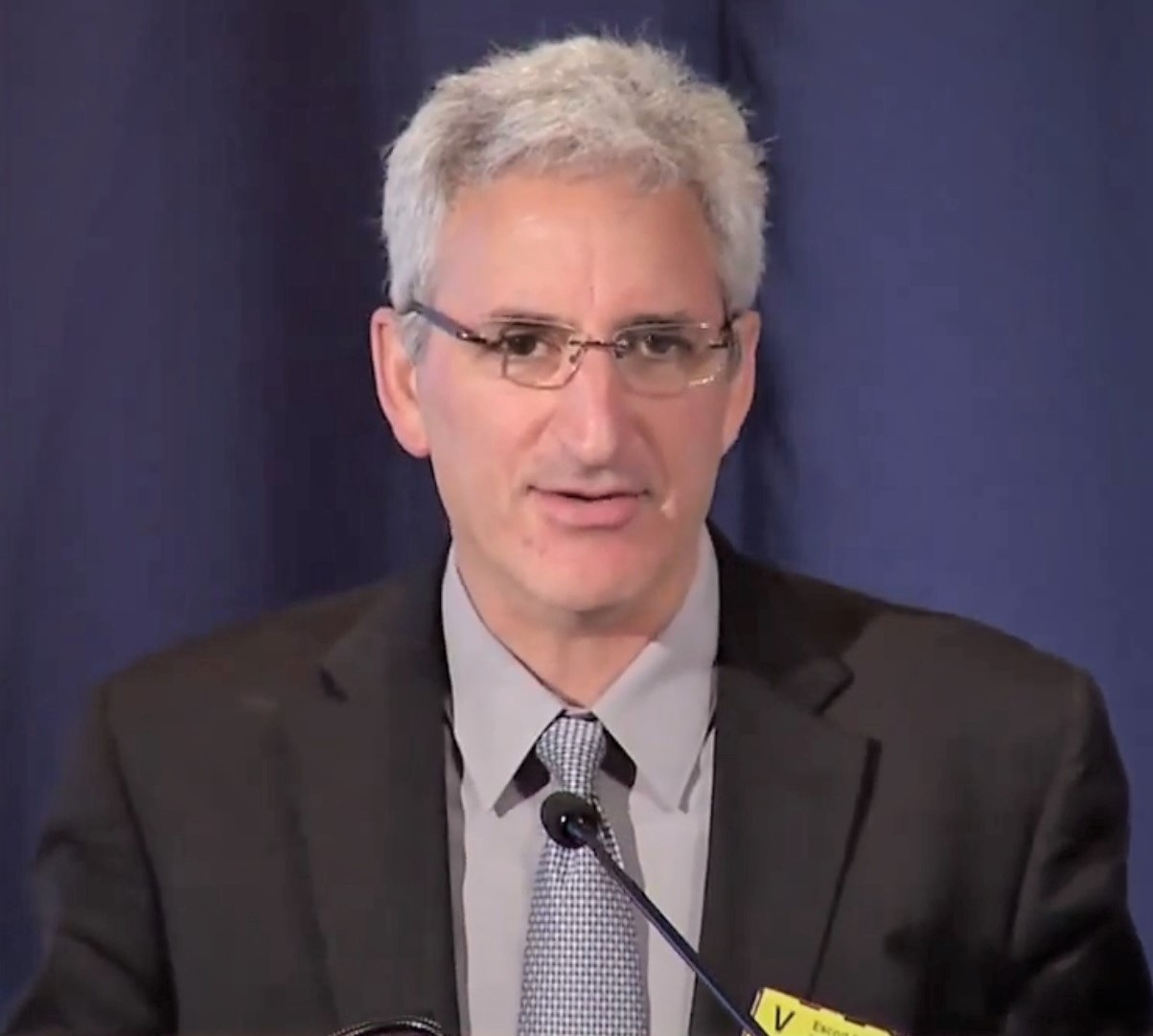
- Born: 1959 (age 65–66)
- Education: Duke University (BA); London School of Economics (MA); Stanford University (PhD)
- Spouse: Diane Lim (2019–present)
- Children: 2

William G. "Bill" Gale is the Arjay and Frances Miller Chair in Federal Economic Policy and the former vice president and director of the Economic Studies Program at the Brookings Institution. He conducts research on a variety of economic issues, focusing particularly on tax policy, fiscal policy, pensions and saving behavior. He is also co-director of the Tax Policy Center, a joint venture of the Brookings Institution and the Urban Institute. Gale attended Duke University and the London School of Economics and received his Ph.D. from Stanford University in 1987.

Prior to joining Brookings in 1992, he was an assistant professor in the Department of Economics at the University of California, Los Angeles, and a senior staff economist for the Council of Economic Advisers under President George H. W. Bush.

== Publications ==
Gale is the author of Fiscal Therapy: Curing America’s Debt Addiction and Investing in the Future (Oxford University Press, 2019).

He has also co-authored or co-editored several books, including Automatic: Changing the Way America Saves (Brookings, 2011), Aging Gracefully: Ideas to Improve Retirement Security in America (Century Foundation, 2006); The Evolving Pension System: Trends, Effects, and Proposals for Reform (Brookings, 2005); Private Pensions and Public Policy (Brookings, Los Angeles, California 2004); Rethinking Estate and Gift Taxation (Brookings, 2001), and Economic Effects of Fundamental Tax Reform (Brookings, 1996).

Gale has written numerous scholarly research articles, including publications in the American Economic Review, Journal of Political Economy, and Quarterly Journal of Economics, and has served as editor and editorial board member of several academic journals. He has also written extensively in policy-related publications and newspapers. Gale has served on advisory boards for the Government Accountability Office, the Internal Revenue Service, the Joint Committee on Taxation and the Board of the Center on Federal Financial Institutions.

=== Selected works ===
- Gale, William G., and John Karl Scholz. "Intergenerational transfers and the accumulation of wealth." Journal of Economic Perspectives 8, no. 4 (1994): 145–160.
- Laibson, David I., Andrea Repetto, Jeremy Tobacman, Robert E. Hall, William G. Gale, and George A. Akerlof. "Self-control and saving for retirement." Brookings papers on economic activity 1998, no. 1 (1998): 91–196.
- Duflo, Esther, William Gale, Jeffrey Liebman, Peter Orszag, and Emmanuel Saez. "Saving incentives for low-and middle-income families: Evidence from a field experiment with H&R Block." The Quarterly Journal of Economics 121, no. 4 (2006): 1311–1346.
- Gale, William G. "The effects of pensions on household wealth: A reevaluation of theory and evidence." Journal of Political economy 106, no. 4 (1998): 706–723.
- Gale, William G., and John Karl Scholz. "IRAs and household saving." The American Economic Review (1994): 1233–1260.
