= Citizens for an Alternative Tax System =

National retail sales tax proponents

Citizens for an Alternative Tax System (CATS) was a national tax reform public interest group in the United States active from 1990 until 2005. The organization's Las Vegas chapter proposed "that Congress should eliminate the IRS and all income taxes, corporate and personal; estate, gift and inheritance taxes, plus many excise taxes; replacing them with a single-rate tax on consumption—a national retail sales tax.

== History ==
Citizens for an Alternative Tax System was founded in 1990 by Scientologist Steven L. Hayes as a way to obsolete the IRS. The project was covertly managed by Scientology's Office of Special Affairs. Until 1993, when it gained tax-exempt status, the Church of Scientology was in conflict with the IRS.

CATS claims to have expanded from nine local offices to over 300 chapters across the United States. Its last Form 990 was filed in 2005.

== See also ==
- Americans For Fair Taxation
- FairTax
- Tax status of Scientology in the United States
