= Bruce Bartlett =

American historian and author (born 1951)

- Born: Bruce Reeves Bartlett; October 11, 1951 (age 74); Ann Arbor, Michigan, U.S.
- Education: Rutgers University (BA); Georgetown University (MA)
- Occupations: Author, historian, economist
- Known for: Opposition to George W. Bush's economic policies
- Political party: Independent
- Parent(s): Frank and Marjorie (Stern) Bartlett

Bruce Reeves Bartlett (born October 11, 1951) is an American historian and author. He served as a domestic policy adviser to Ronald Reagan and as a Treasury official under George H. W. Bush. Bartlett also writes for the New York Times Economix blog.

Bartlett has written several books and magazine articles critical of the George W. Bush administration, asserting that its economic policies significantly departed from traditional conservative principles.

== Early life and education ==
Bartlett was born October 11, 1951, in Ann Arbor, Michigan, the son of Marjorie (Stern) and Frank Bartlett. He attended Rutgers University, where he received a B.A. in 1973, and Georgetown University, where he received an M.A. in 1976. He originally studied American diplomatic history under Lloyd Gardner at Rutgers and Jules Davids at Georgetown. He did a master's thesis on the origins of the Pearl Harbor attack at Georgetown, the substance of which was later published as Coverup: The Politics of Pearl Harbor, 1941–1946. He was closely advised by Percy Greaves, Republican counsel to the U.S. Congressional Joint Committee on the Investigation of the Pearl Harbor Attack.

== Political career ==
In 1976, Bartlett began working for U.S. Congressman Ron Paul (R-Texas). Paul was defeated when he ran for re-election in November 1976.

In January 1977, Bartlett went to work for U.S. Congressman Jack Kemp (R-New York) as a staff economist. Bartlett spent much of his time on tax issues, helping to draft the Kemp-Roth tax bill, which ultimately formed the basis of Ronald Reagan's 1981 tax cut. Bartlett's book, Reaganomics: Supply-Side Economics in Action, appeared in 1981 (New Rochelle, NY: Arlington House Publishers). He also co-edited the book The Supply-Side Solution (Chatham, NJ: Chatham House Publishers, 1983).

In 1978, Bartlett went to work for Perry Duryea, who was the Republican candidate for governor of New York. Duryea was defeated in November and Bartlett returned to Washington, where he joined the staff of newly elected Senator Roger Jepsen (R-Iowa).

=== Reagan administration ===
In 1981, Jepsen became Vice chairman of the Joint Economic Committee of Congress and Bartlett became deputy director of the committee's staff. Jepsen became chairman in 1983 and Bartlett became executive director of the JEC. During this period, the committee was very active in promoting Ronald Reagan's economic policies.

In late 1984, Bartlett became vice president of Polyconomics, a New Jersey–based consulting company founded by Jude Wanniski, a former editorial writer with The Wall Street Journal, that advised Wall Street clients on economic and investment policy. Bartlett left in 1985 to become a senior fellow at The Heritage Foundation in Washington, D.C., where he specialized in tax policy and was involved in the debate around the Tax Reform Act of 1986.

=== George H. W. Bush administration ===
In 1987, Bartlett became a senior policy analyst in the White House Office of Policy Development, then headed by Gary Bauer. He left in 1988 to become the deputy assistant secretary for economic policy at the Treasury Department, where he served until the end of the George H. W. Bush administration.

Afterwards, Bartlett worked briefly at the Cato Institute in 1993. From 1993 to 2005, Bartlett was affiliated with the National Center for Policy Analysis, a free-market think tank based in Dallas, Texas.

Since 1995, he has written a newspaper column for Creators Syndicate, based in Los Angeles, and written extensively for many newspapers and magazines, including The Wall Street Journal, The New York Times, the Los Angeles Times, Fortune magazine, and Commentary magazine.

== Political positions ==
=== Criticism of George W. Bush administration economic policy ===
In 2005, the National Center for Policy Analysis fired Bartlett for his criticism of President George W. Bush.

In 2006, he published Impostor: How George W. Bush Bankrupted America and Betrayed the Reagan Legacy, which is critical of the George W. Bush administration's economic policies as departing from traditional conservative principles. He described Bush and Richard M. Nixon as "two superficially conservative presidents who enacted liberal programs to buy votes for reelection."

In his 2009 book, The New American Economy: The Failure of Reaganomics and a New Way Forward, Bartlett defended Keynesian economic policies, stating that while supply-side economics had been appropriate for the 1970s and 1980s, supply-side arguments did not fit contemporary conditions.

During an interview on CNN on August 19, 2011, Bartlett stated that presidential candidate Rick Perry "is an idiot, and I don't think anybody would disagree with that." The comment was in reference to Perry's earlier assertion that Federal Reserve Chairman Ben Bernanke's actions would be "almost treasonous" if the Federal Reserve were to engage in expansionary monetary policy before the 2012 election in order to stimulate the economy.

In a 2013 article for The American Conservative, Bartlett explained that after conducting research for the book, he "came to the annoying conclusion that Keynes had been 100 percent right in the 1930s", that "we needed Keynesian policies again", and that "no one has been more correct in his analysis and prescriptions for the economy's problems than Paul Krugman", a prominent Keynesian economist.

=== Criticism of "Fair Tax" proposal ===
In an August 2007 The Wall Street Journal op-ed, Bartlett criticized the FairTax proposal as misleading and unlikely to simplify taxpaying. Bartlett was especially critical of what he states are FairTax's accounting tricks in rate calculation and proponent claims that "real investment spending would rise 76%" if their plan were adopted. Supporters of the FairTax proposal accused him of falsely conflating their campaign with a national sales tax proposal by an organization affiliated with the Church of Scientology. In a September 2007 article for The New Republic, Bartlett stated that the FairTax proposal was "nearly identical" to a Scientologist proposal.

== Personal life ==
Bartlett and his wife Nancy Christy live in Great Falls, Virginia. He is a member of the American Economic Association and the Committee for Monetary Research and Education.

== Works ==
Books

- Bruce R. Bartlett, The Keynesian Revolution Revisited, Committee for Monetary Research and Education, 1977.
- Bruce R. Bartlett, Cover-Up: The Politics of Pearl Harbor, 1941–1946, Arlington House Productions (1978) ISBN 978-0-87000-423-0
- Bruce R. Bartlett, Reagonomics: Supply-side economics in action, Arlington House (1981) ISBN 978-0-87000-505-3, Random House Value Publishing (1982) ISBN 978-0-517-54817-2
- Bruce R. Bartlett and Timothy Roth, The Supply Side Solution, Chatham House (1983) ISBN 978-0-934540-18-6, Palgrave Macmillan (1984) ISBN 978-0-333-37364-4
- Bruce R. Bartlett, Impostor: How George W. Bush Bankrupted America and Betrayed the Reagan Legacy, Doubleday (2006) ISBN 978-0-385-51827-7
- Bruce R. Bartlett, Wrong on Race: The Democratic Party's Buried Past, Palgrave Macmillan (2008) ISBN 978-0-230-60062-1, Palgrave Macmillan (2009) ISBN 978-0-230-61099-6
- Bruce R. Bartlett, The New American Economy: The Failure of Reaganomics and a New Way Forward, Palgrave Macmillan (2009) ISBN 978-0-230-61587-8
- Bruce R. Bartlett, The Benefit and the Burden: Tax Reform – Why We Need It and What It Will Take, Simon & Schuster (2012) ISBN 978-1-4516-4619-1
- Bruce R. Bartlett, The Truth Matters: A Citizen's Guide to Separating Facts from Lies and Stopping Fake News in Its Tracks, Ten Speed Press (2017) ISBN 978-0-399-58116-8

Contributor to

- The First Year: A Mandate for Leadership Report, Heritage Foundation, 1982.
- Supply Side Economics, Aletheia Books, 1982.
- Agenda '83: A Mandate for Leadership Report, Heritage Foundation, 1983.
- The Federal Debt: On-Budget, Off-Budget, and Contingent Liabilities: A Staff Study, U.S. G.P.O., 1983.
- The Industrial Policy Debate, Institute for Contemporary Studies, 1984.
- Beyond the Status Quo, Cato Institute, 1985.
- Articles in National Review, Human Events, Conservative Digest, and Modern Age, and to newspapers. Contributing editor of Libertarian Review.
