= Journal of Public Economic Theory =

The Journal of Public Economic Theory is a fully peer-reviewed academic journal of public economic theory published by Wiley-Blackwell. It covers public economic theory and general economics, including public goods, local public goods, club economies, externalities, taxation, growth, public choice, social and public decision making, voting, market failure, regulation, project evaluation, equity, and political systems. The editors are Rabah Amir, Helmuth Cremer, and Myrna Holtz Wooders (Vanderbilt University).

The Journal of Public Economic Theory is the official publication of the Association for Public Economic Theory.

The journal is abstracted and indexed by ABI/INFORM (ProQuest), American Business Law Journal (Academy of Legal Studies in Business), CatchWord (Publishing Technology), Current Contents: Social & Behavioral Sciences (Clarivate Analytics), EBSCO Online (EBSCO Publishing), EconLit (AEA), Journal Citation Reports/Social Science Edition (Clarivate Analytics), ProQuest Central (ProQuest), RePEc: Research Papers in Economics, and the Social Sciences Citation Index (Clarivate Analytics).

According to the Journal Citation Reports, under the current editorship, the Journal of Public Economic Theory has a 2019 impact factor of 1.037.
