= President's Advisory Panel on Federal Tax Reform =

2005 government panel in the US

On January 7, 2005, President George W. Bush announced the establishment of the President's Advisory Panel on Federal Tax Reform, a bipartisan panel to advise on options to reform the United States income tax code to make it simpler, fairer, and more pro-growth to benefit all Americans.

== Origins ==
The task force was created by the President's Executive Order 13369, amended by subsequent orders 13379 and 13386.

== Report ==
On November 1, 2005, the Advisory Panel submitted to the Secretary of the Treasury a report containing revenue-neutral policy options for reforming the Federal Internal Revenue Code. The options are meant to:

- simplify Federal tax laws to reduce the costs and administrative burdens of compliance with such laws;
- share the burdens and benefits of the Federal tax structure in an appropriately progressive manner while recognizing the importance of homeownership and charity in American society; and
- promote long-run economic growth and job creation, and better encourage work effort, saving, and investment, so as to strengthen the competitiveness of the United States in the global marketplace.

== Members ==
Panel members included:

- Connie Mack III, Chairman
- John Breaux, Vice-chairman
- William E. Frenzel
- Elizabeth Garrett
- Edward P. Lazear
- Timothy J. Muris
- James M. Poterba
- Charles O. Rossotti
- Liz Ann Sonders
