= Beacon Hill Institute =

Economic research organization

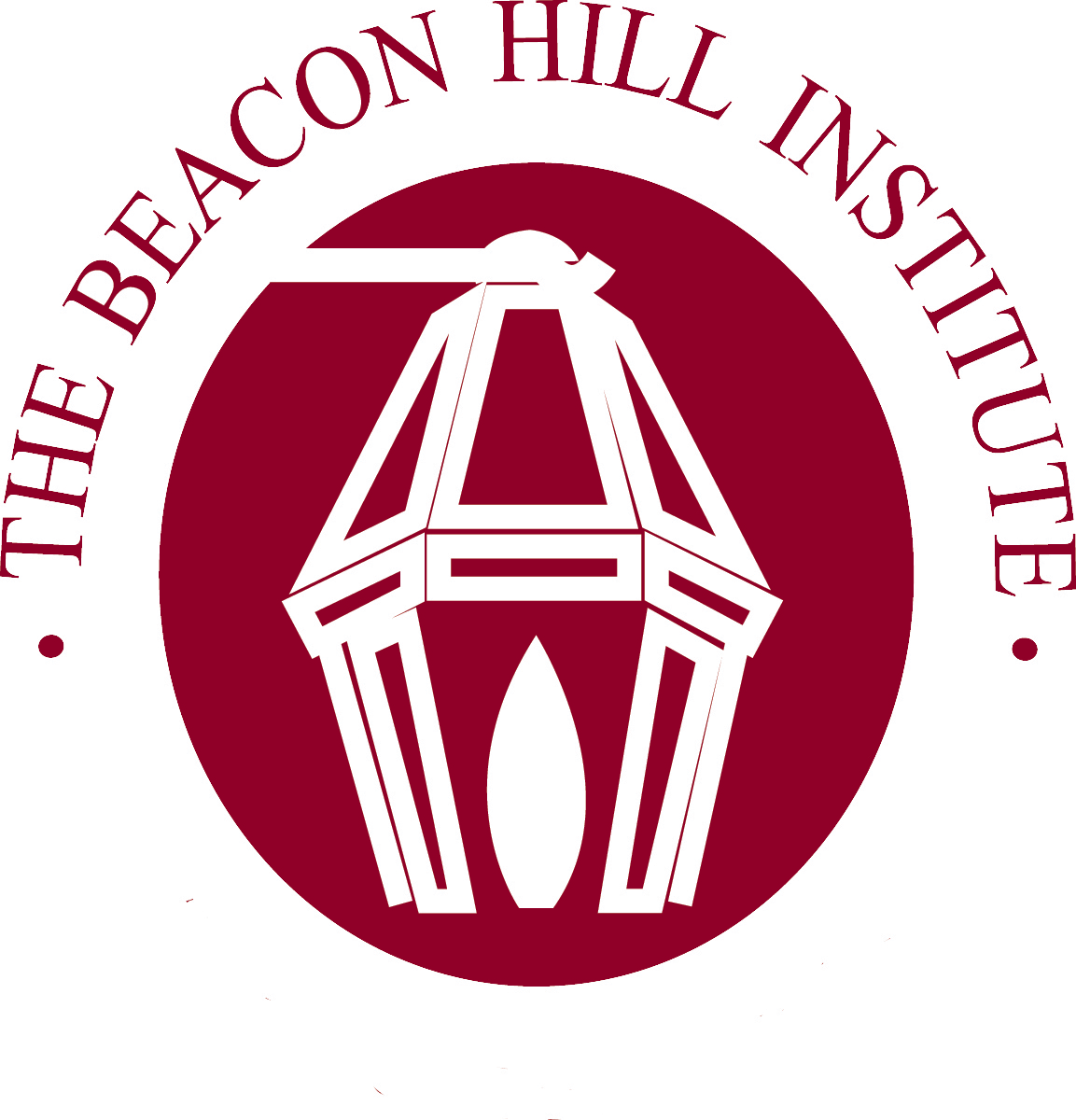
- Abbreviation: BHI
- Formation: 1991; 35 years ago
- Type: Nonprofit think tank
- Purpose: State tax and regulatory policy
- Location: Medway, Massachusetts
- President: David G. Tuerck
- Revenue: $198,466 (2017)
- Expenses: $163,069 (2017)
- Website: www.beaconhill.org

The Beacon Hill Institute (BHI) is an economic research organization currently located in Medway, Massachusetts. It was founded in Boston in 1991 by businessman Ray Shamie. The institute conducts national and state tax policy research, independent or commissioned, and distributes it to interested citizens and policy makers through various print and electronic media, including policy studies; BHI FaxSheets; policy forums; opinion editorials; radio and TV interviews; and its web site.

The institute describes itself as "grounded in the principles of limited government, fiscal responsibility and free markets".

The institute was previously affiliated with the Department of Economics at Suffolk University. However, the relationship was terminated, and the institute has been unaffiliated with any school or university since December 30, 2016.

== Activities ==
BHI specializes in the development of economic and statistical models for policy analysis. These include STAMP and LAMP, computer generalized equilibrium models, that are frequently used in BHI analysis of state and local tax policy issues. It is also known for its internship program that trains future economists and policymakers.

The Institute also publishes its State Competitiveness Index, which tracks the ability of states to promote economic growth in terms of personal income.
