= Hire More Heroes Act of 2013 =

Proposed United States law

- Long title: To amend the Internal Revenue Code of 1986 to allow employers to exempt employees with health coverage under TRICARE or the Veterans Administration from being taken into account for purposes of the employer mandate under the Patient Protection and Affordable Care Act.
- Announced in: the 113th United States Congress
- Sponsored by: Rep. Rodney Davis (R, IL-13)
- Number of co-sponsors: 0

Codification
- Acts affected: Internal Revenue Code
- U.S.C. sections affected: 38 U.S.C. ch. 18, 38 U.S.C. ch. 17, 10 U.S.C. ch. 55
- Agencies affected: United States Department of Veterans Affairs, Department of Health and Human Services, United States Department of Defense

Legislative history
- Introduced in the House as H.R. 3474 by Rep. Rodney Davis (R, IL-13) on November 13, 2013; Committee consideration by United States House Committee on Ways and Means; Passed the House on March 11, 2014 (Roll Call Vote 115: 406-1)

The Hire More Heroes Act of 2013 (H.R. 3474) is a bill that would allow employers to exclude veterans receiving health insurance from the United States Department of Defense or the United States Department of Veterans' Affairs from their list of employees. This would have the effect of keeping their list of employees shorter, allowing some small businesses to fall underneath the 50 full-time employees line that would require them to provide their employees with healthcare under the requirements of the Affordable Care Act. This change is seen by supporters as a way to incentivize small businesses to hire more veterans.

Rodney L. Davis of Illinois's 13th congressional district introduced the bill into the United States House of Representatives during the 113th United States Congress, on November 13, 2013. The bill passed into the House on March 11, 2014. The United States Senate began working on the bill in May 2014, when it decided to amend the bill so that it could serve as the legislative vehicle for S. 2260 the EXPIRE Act. The EXPIRE Act would extend a variety of tax credits that expired at the end of 2013.

== Background ==
Roughly 8 million veterans received health coverage through the Veterans Administration in 2013.

Over 50 different tax breaks, in addition to the Research & Experimentation Tax Credit, expired at the end of 2013.

== Provisions of the bill ==
=== Provisions of the Hire More Heroes Act of 2013 ===
This summary is based largely on the summary provided by the Congressional Research Service, a public domain source.

The Hire More Heroes Act of 2013 would amend the Internal Revenue Code to permit an employer, for purposes of determining whether such employer is an applicable large employer and thus required to provide health care coverage to its employees under the Patient Protection and Affordable Care Act, to exclude employees who have coverage under a health care program administered by the United States Department of Defense (DOD), including TRICARE, or the United States Department of Veterans Affairs (VA).

=== Provisions of the EXPIRE Act ===
The EXPIRE Act would cost $85 billion. It would extend a variety of tax credits and tax relief measures, including the research and development tax credit. It also includes provisions providing incentives for the wind industry.

== Procedural history ==
The Hire More Heroes Act of 2013 was introduced into the United States House of Representatives on November 13, 2013 by Rep. Rodney Davis (R, IL-13). It was referred to the United States House Committee on Ways and Means. On March 7, 2014, House Majority Leader Eric Cantor announced that H.R. 3474 would be considered under a suspension of the rules on March 11, 2014. The House voted on March 11, 2014 to pass the bill in Roll Call Vote 115 by a vote of 406-1.

On May 13, 2014, the United States Senate voted in Recorded Vote 143 to invoke cloture on the motion to proceed to H.R. 3474, passing the motion 96-3. This meant that the Senate agreed to move on to considering H.R. 3474 as their next action, which they were expected to consider for a week. Instead of addressing the question of excluding veterans from the count of employees under the Affordable Care Act, the Senate was expected to amend the bill so that it could serve as the legislative vehicle for S. 2260 the EXPIRE Act. The EXPIRE Act would be easier for the House to pass if the Senate sends it to that chamber as an amendment to a House-passed bill instead of a newly arrived Senate bill.

== Debate and discussion ==
=== Debate over the Hire More Heroes Act of 2013 ===
One of the bill's co-sponsors, Rep. Randy Hultgren (R-IL), wrote in favor of the bill saying that the employer health insurance mandate "is just another costly burden that discourages employers from expanding their workforce, and our economy cannot afford it. Lifting this burden on small businesses is a win for our veterans and our economy."

Rep. Davis, who introduced the bill said that the bill "gives our small businesses another incentive to hire veterans, which helps to address the increasing number of unemployed veterans, while providing them with some relief from ObamaCare."

=== Debate about the EXPIRE Act ===
The Club for Growth, a conservative group, objected to the legislation and called it a "special-interest orgy." Wind energy related tax provisions in the Senate bill would cost almost $13 billion and are opposed by some Republicans.

On May 9, 2014, the House passed the American Research and Competitiveness Act of 2014 (H.R. 4438; 113th Congress), a bill that would make permanent the Research & Experimentation Tax Credit, a business tax credit for companies pursuing research and development projects in the United States. The credit was created in 1981, has been renewed multiple times, and recently expired. Since the Senate's EXPIRE Act has a similar provision to extend this tax credit, there is some hope that the two parties will be able to compromise about it. However, the major difference between the two is that the House is making some tax extenders permanent, while the Senate is still pushing for a variety of shorter extensions, as has been traditionally done.

Senate Majority Leader Harry Reid (D-NV) said that the bill "will help countless Americans" and "bring American families and the economy a fair shot."

Senator Ron Wyden (D-OR), the Senate Finance Committee chairman, said that his "first choice" would be to pass tax reform immediately, but that "the reality is that tax reform is not happening tomorrow. Reaching a bipartisan, comprehensive plan is going to take time and work."

Senator Jeff Flake (R-AZ) argued that "rather than blindly extending these provisions, what we ought to do is eliminate these wasteful extenders which are really just subsidies" such as the production tax credit. According to Flake, due to the United States' debt of $17.5 trillion, subsidies need to be eliminated.

== See also ==
- List of bills in the 113th United States Congress
- Patient Protection and Affordable Care Act
- Provisions of the Patient Protection and Affordable Care Act
- Veteran
