= Tax reform =

Method of changing compulsory fees or levies as part of broad economic programmes

Tax reform is the process of changing the way taxes are collected or managed by the government and is usually undertaken to improve tax administration or to provide economic or social benefits. Tax reform can include reducing the level of taxation of all people by the government, making the tax system more progressive or less progressive, or simplifying the tax system and making the system more understandable or more accountable.

Numerous organizations have been set up to reform tax systems worldwide, often with the intent to reform income taxes or value-added taxes into something considered more economically liberal. Other reforms propose tax systems that attempt to deal with externalities. Such reforms are sometimes proposed to be revenue-neutral, for example in revenue neutrality of the FairTax, meaning they ought not result in more tax or less being collected. Georgism claims that various forms of land tax can both deal with externalities and improve productivity.

== Australia ==
Tax reform was an increasingly significant issue on the Australian political agenda. Combined annual deficits of the Commonwealth and State and territory governments will rise from 1.9% of gross domestic product in 2011–12 to 5.9% of GDP by 2049–50. Widespread, wholesale tax reform in Australia has not occurred since the introduction of the Goods and Services Tax in 2000. The Henry Tax Review identified 138 areas for significant reform to Australia's tax system over the next 10 to 20 years.

In July 2013, PricewaterhouseCoopers proposed significant tax reform in the context of an ageing population and slowing of the Australian mining boom. PricewaterhouseCoopers proposed improving the efficiency of the Australian tax system through analysing the competitiveness of the levels of taxation, its effect on production and the importance of broad-based taxes to reduce economic distortion. For example, over 115 other taxes raise less revenue than one tax: the Goods and Services Tax. This report received widespread coverage in the Australian press.

== United States ==
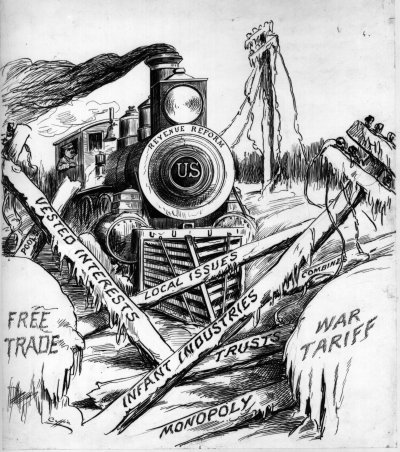
"'Revenue Reform' Train Stopped by 'Vested Interests,' 'Local Issues,' 'Trusts,' and other poles" — political cartoon from 1880–1900 commenting on tax reform

There have been many movements in the United States to reform the collection and management of taxes.

During the late 19th century, American economist Henry George started a global movement for tax reform. The aim of the movement was the abolition of all forms of taxation other than the Single Tax on land value. The effects of the movement on taxation policy, although diminished, can be seen in many parts of the world including Australia, New Zealand, Hong Kong, Taiwan and Singapore. Efforts to promote this form of tax reform in the United States continue under the aegis of organizations such as The Henry George Foundation of America.

In 1986, landmark tax reform was passed in the Tax Reform Act of 1986. In the 1990s, reform proposals arose over the double-taxation of corporate income, with a large report in 1992 by the Internal Revenue Service (IRS).

During the Bush administration, the President's Advisory Panel for Federal Tax Reform recommended the removal of the alternative minimum tax. Several organizations are working for tax reform in the United States including Americans for Tax Reform, Americans For Fair Taxation and Americans Standing for the Simplification of the Estate Tax (ASSET). Various proposals have been put forth for tax simplification in the United States, including the FairTax and various flat tax plans and bipartisan tax reform proposals.

In 2010, Fareed Zakaria proposed what he described as a "grand bargain" with tax reform for economic adversaries Paul Krugman and Niall Ferguson; an attempt to bridge their political divide with the creation of a simple and indirect Federal Sales Tax. Representative Chaka Fattah of Pennsylvania introduced a bill, H.R. 4646, called the Debt Free America Act that would introduce a 1% financial transaction tax and eliminate federal income tax. He has introduced bills calling for similar tax reform since 2004, but the bills have never made it out of committee.

President Obama's tax reform proposals are highlighted in his administration's 2013 United States federal budget proposal and in a framework for corporate and international tax reform presented by the administration. While some of these proposals have become irrelevant due to the “United States fiscal cliff” agreement at the end of calendar year 2012, these policies present a center-left approach to tax reform. In general, the proposals involve some marginal tax rate increases, some marginal tax rate decreases, and base broadening by closing, canceling, or limiting tax loopholes, deductions, credits, or other tax expenditures for top income earners and corporations.

In December 2017, the Senate passed the Tax Cuts and Jobs Act of 2017. On December 22, 2017 President Trump signed into law the tax reform bill passed by the House and Senate.

The business community avidly lobbied in support of the bill, which included corporate tax cuts among more comprehensive reform. The National Retail Federation was a leading voice in this effort, since previously, retailers paid one of the highest corporate tax rates.

== Tax choice ==
Tax choice is the theory that taxpayers should have more control with how their individual taxes are allocated. If taxpayers could choose which government organizations received their taxes, opportunity cost decisions would integrate their partial knowledge. For example, a taxpayer who allocated more of his taxes on public education would have less to allocate on public healthcare. Supporters argue that allowing taxpayers to demonstrate their preferences would help ensure that the government succeeds at efficiently producing the public goods that taxpayers truly value.

== See also ==
Organizations

- Americans For Fair Taxation
- Americans for Tax Reform
- Americans Standing for the Simplification of the Estate Tax
- FreedomWorks
- Peterson Institute for International Economics, Tax Reforms in Advanced Economies.

Proposals

- ATCOR
- FairTax
- Flat tax
- Hall-Rabushka flat tax
- Land value tax
- 9–9–9 Plan
- Automated Payment Transaction tax
- Kepner Income Tax

Related concepts

- Excess burden of taxation (see deadweight loss)
- Optimal tax
- Single tax
- Tax cut
- Tax shift
