= Taxpayer groups =

Category of advocacy group

Taxpayer groups, taxpayers associations, or taxpayers unions, are formal nonprofit or informal advocacy groups that promote lower taxation, reductions in government spending, and limits to government debt.

Many American cities and counties have taxpayer groups. Members of these groups try to make their presence felt by attending government budget hearings, working with elected officials, and distributing information with their views on taxing and spending. They can even initiate legislation at the state level to keep taxes and spending in check.

== List of taxpayers unions ==
- Australia - Australian Taxpayers' Alliance
- Canada - Canadian Taxpayers' Alliance
- Canada - Canadian Taxpayers Federation
- France - Associated taxpayers
- Germany - German Taxpayers Federation
- India - Taxpayers Association Vijayawada
- India - Taxpayers Association of Bharat TAXAB www.taxab.org
- Kenya - National Taxpayers Association
- Nepal - Nepalese Taxpayers Welfare Society www.ntws.org.np
- New Zealand - New Zealand Taxpayers' Union
- Portugal - Associação Portuguesa de Contribuintes www.contribuintes.org
- Sweden - Swedish Taxpayers' Association
- Switzerland - Swiss Taxpayers Federation
- United Kingdom - The TaxPayers' Alliance
- United States - Americans For Fair Taxation
- United States - Americans for Tax Reform
- United States - National Taxpayers Union
