= Australian Taxpayers' Alliance =

Advocacy group

Australian Taxpayers’ Alliance
- Abbreviation: ATA
- Formation: 2012
- Website: taxpayers.org.au

The Australian Taxpayers’ Alliance (ATA) is a taxpayer group whose stated mission is "to transform Australia into [a] low-tax, small-government, market-based economy."

== Projects ==
Founded in 2012, the ATA partners with a variety of organizations to advance its goals. As of 2019, it counts 75,000 members.

In 2017, ATA coordinated an international coalition to abolish a goods and service tax levied on online purchases. Members of the coalition included Americans for Tax Reform (the U.S.), the Canadian Taxpayers Federation (Canada), and the Freedom Association (the U.K.), among other groups. Australia’s Department of the Treasury and the Productivity Commission invited ATA to submit a report on this issue.

Also in 2017, ATA co-founded Legalise Vaping Australia (LVA), an advocacy group to reform laws about vaping and e-cigarettes across Australia. LVA’s efforts have been profiled in media such as BuzzFeed, ABC, and the Daily Telegraph.

ATA has also taken an active role in the carbon tax debate. This campaign arose from Stop Gillard’s Carbon Tax, a project of Tim Andrews, ATA’s founder. The Spectator called Andrews “one of the masterminds behind the anti-carbon-tax protests that have Labor’s hold on government on tenterhooks.”

== Public criticism ==
Some media attention has focused on potential ties to the American billionaire Koch Brothers, due to the past affiliations of board members of the ATA, as well as claims the ATA is part of a “network of organisations that has close links to foreign backed political lobby groups”.

== Conferences ==
Since 2012, together with the Australian Libertarian Society, ATA has organized the annual Friedman Conference. Described by David Leyonhjelm, a leader of the Liberal Democratic Party in the Senate, as the biggest libertarian-oriented event in the Asia Pacific region, the conference convenes groups such as the Atlas Network, the Cato Institute, and the Institute of Public Affairs, along with speakers such as Grover Norquist, John Fund, and Mark Latham.

In 2019, ATA organized the World Taxpayer Conference. The conference’s board of directors includes representatives from groups such as the National Taxpayers Union, the TaxPayers’ Alliance, and the Taxpayers Protection Alliance, several of which receive funding from the Koch family. On this basis, the Australian Financial Review called the ATA the “Koch brothers’ new Australian friends.”

== Political positions ==
ATA is best known for its involvement in the campaign to repeal Australia’s carbon tax.

ATA also lobbies for open government. In 2019, it pressured the Commonwealth to launch a transparency website, where all federal bodies must publish their annual reports.

ATA also supports the legalization of electronic cigarettes.
