= List of CANZUK endorsements =

This is a list of notable individuals and organizations who have voiced their endorsement of CANZUK, the deepening of ties between Canada, Australia, New Zealand, and the United Kingdom.

== Australia ==
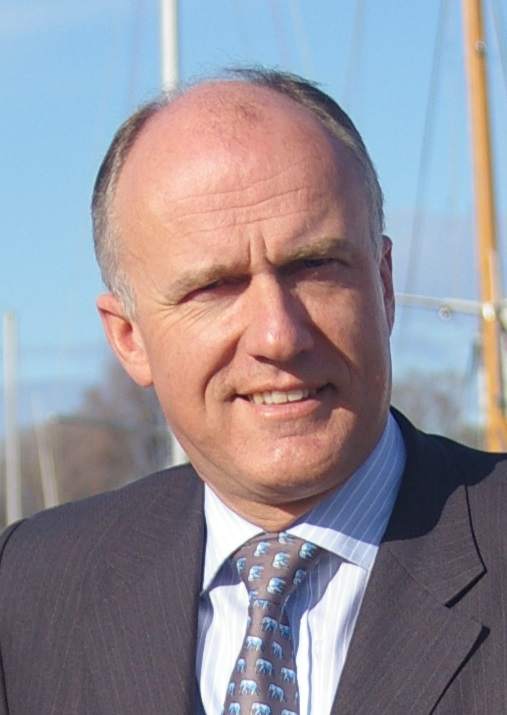
Eric Abetz

=== Senators ===
- James Paterson, Liberal Senator for Victoria

=== Former Senators ===
- Eric Abetz, Liberal Senator for Tasmania

=== Former MP ===
- Tony Abbott, former Prime Minister.

=== Organisations ===
- Australian Taxpayers' Alliance

== Canada ==
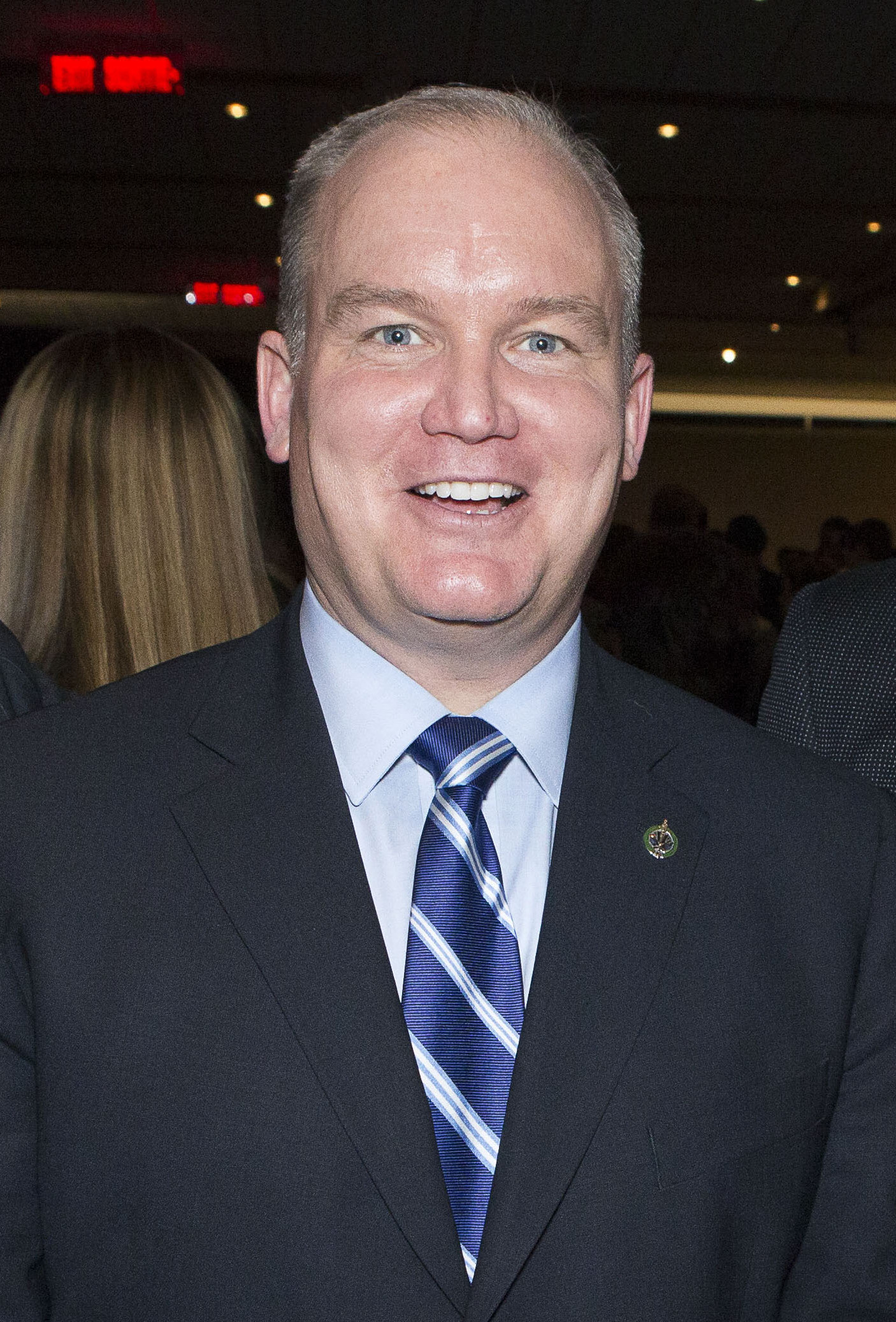
Erin O'Toole, former Leader of the Conservative Party of Canada

=== Parties ===
- The Conservative Party of Canada, a centre-right to right-wing federal political party in Canada
- The Canadian Future Party, a centrist federal political party in Canada

=== MPs ===
- Mark Carney, Prime Minister of Canada since 2025, MP for Nepean
- Andrew Scheer, Leader of the Official Opposition from 2017 to 2020, MP for Regina—Qu'Appelle
- Dean Allison, Official Opposition Critic for International Trade since 2017, MP for Niagara West
- John Brassard, Deputy Opposition Whip since 2017, MP for Barrie—Innisfil
- Kelly McCauley, Opposition Deputy Critic for Public Services and Procurement since 2018, MP for Edmonton West
- Michael Chong, Shadow Minister for Infrastructure, Communities and Urban Affairs since 2017, MP for Wellington—Halton Hills
- Pierre Poilievre, leader of the Conservative Party since 2022, MP for Carleton from 2004 to 2025
- Todd Doherty, Opposition Critic for Fisheries & Oceans since 2017, MP for Cariboo—Prince George
- Stephanie Kusie, MP for Calgary Midnapore

=== Former MPs ===
- Ed Fast, Official Opposition Critic for the Environment since 2015, former MP for Abbotsford
- Erin O'Toole, Leader of the Official Opposition from 2020 to 2022, former MP for Durham
- Frank Baylis, former MP for Pierrefonds—Dollard and candidate in the 2025 Liberal Party of Canada leadership election
- Lisa Raitt, former MP for Milton and the Conservative Party deputy leader from 2017 to 2019
- Peter Kent, former MP for Thornhill

=== Organisations ===
- The Young Liberals of Canada, the youth-wing of Liberal Party of Canada

== New Zealand ==
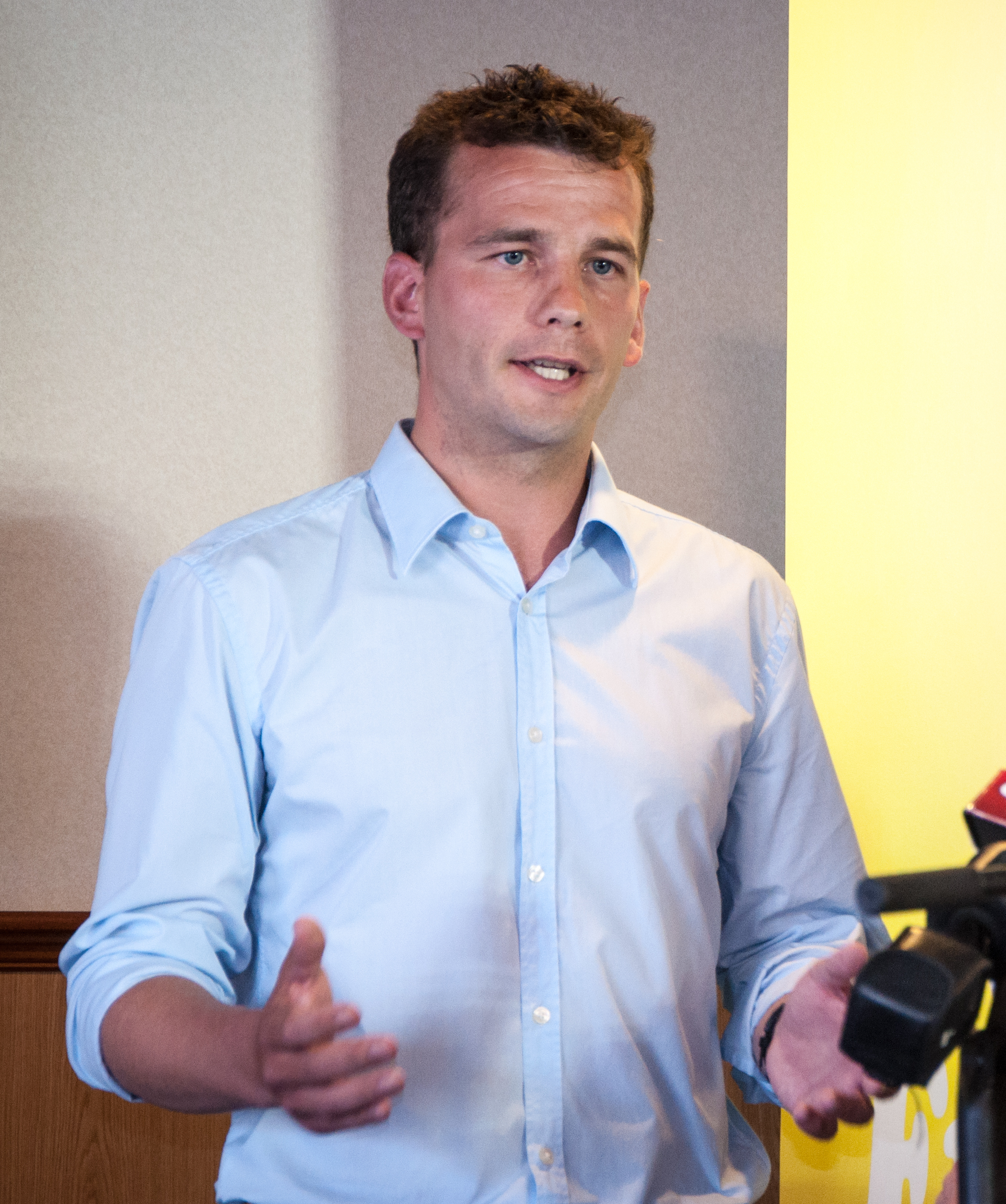
David Seymour

=== Parties ===
- ACT New Zealand, a right-wing, classical-liberal political party in New Zealand

=== MPs ===
- David Seymour, Leader of ACT New Zealand, Minister for Regulation, MP for Epsom
- Winston Peters, Minister of Foreign Affairs, Minister for Racing, MP for New Zealand First List and three-time Deputy Prime Minister of New Zealand

=== Former MPs ===
- Simon Bridges, then Leader of the Opposition, former MP for Tauranga

=== Academics ===
- Noel Cox, lawyer, legal scholar, and Anglican priest

== United Kingdom ==
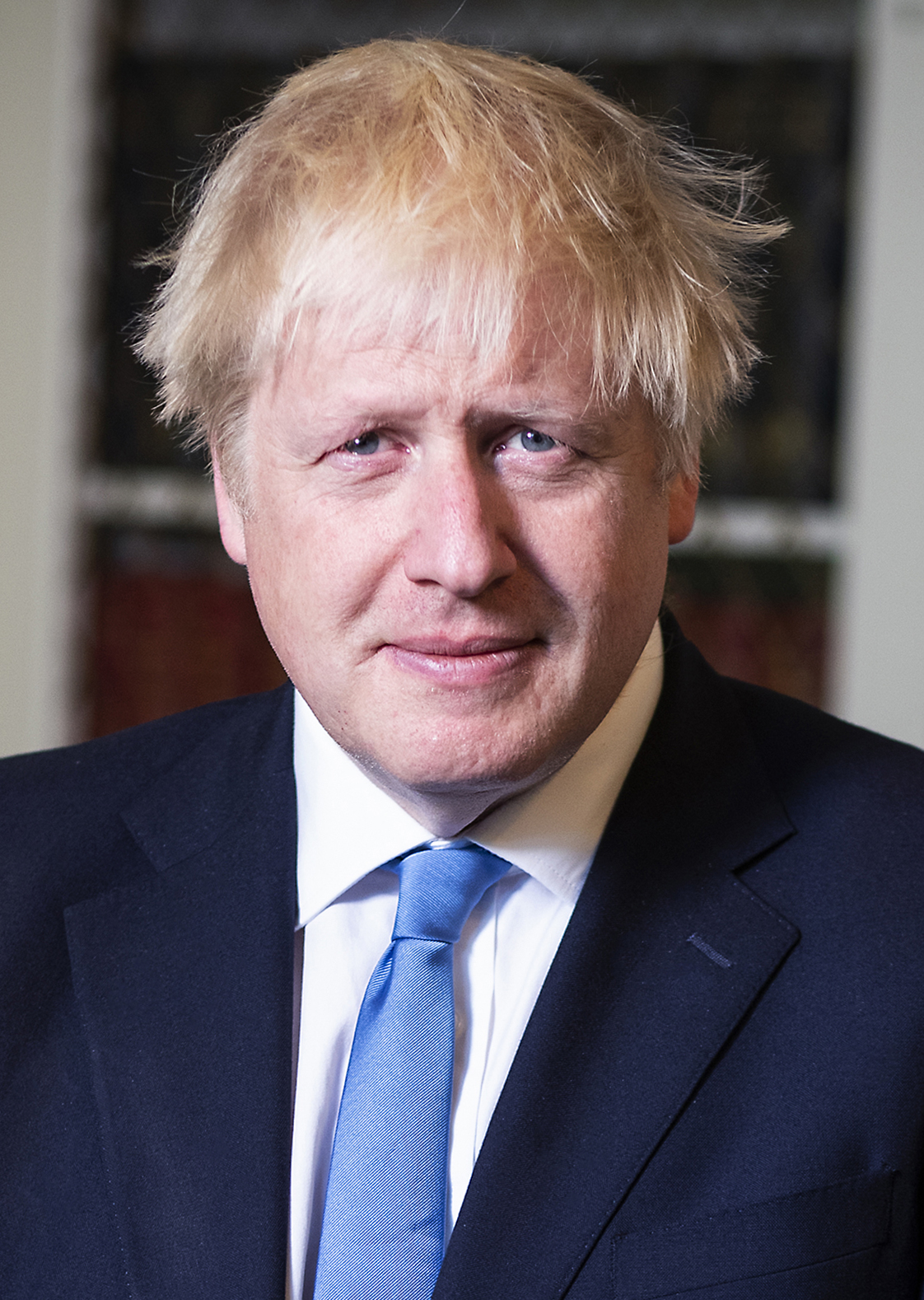
Boris Johnson

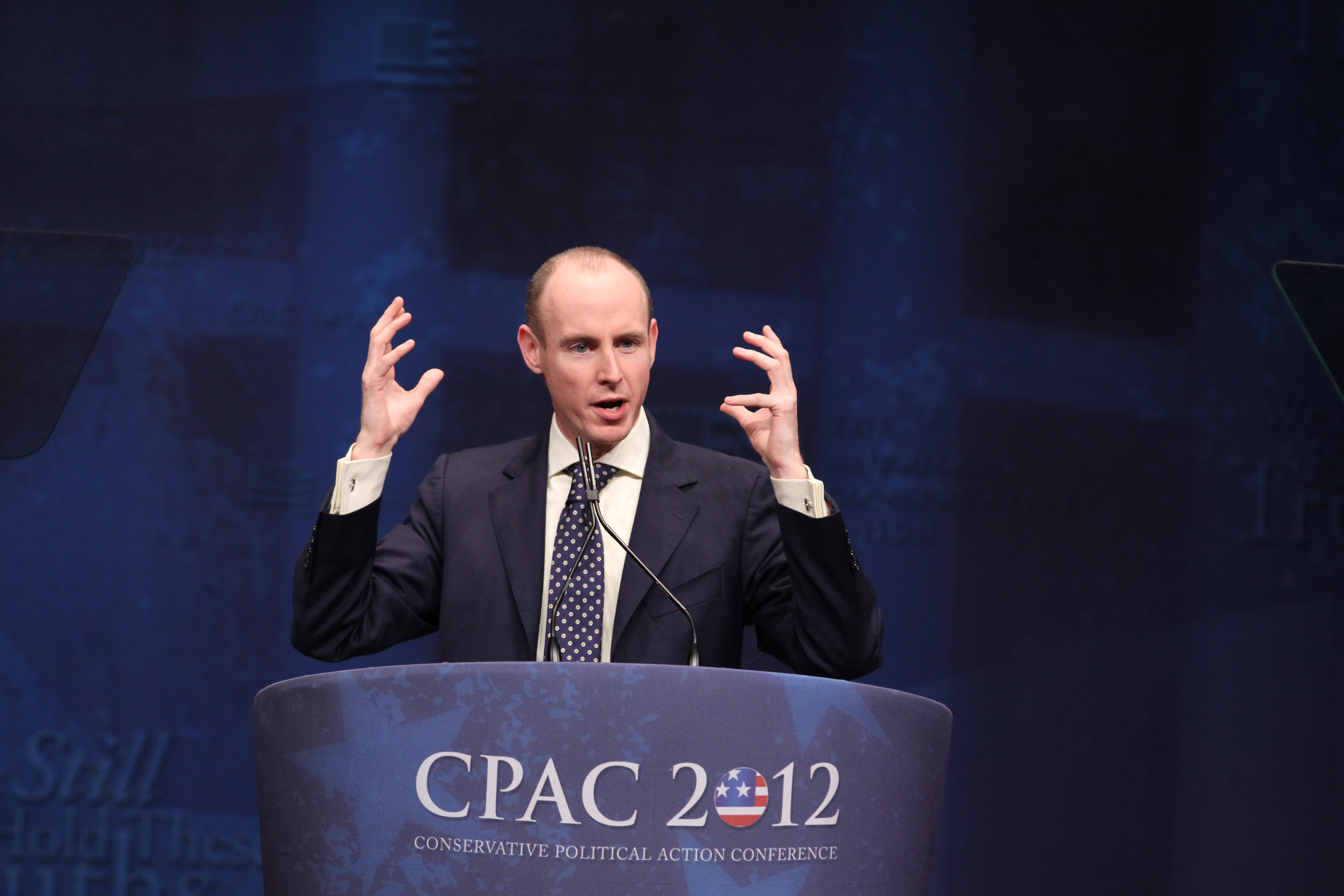
Daniel Hannan

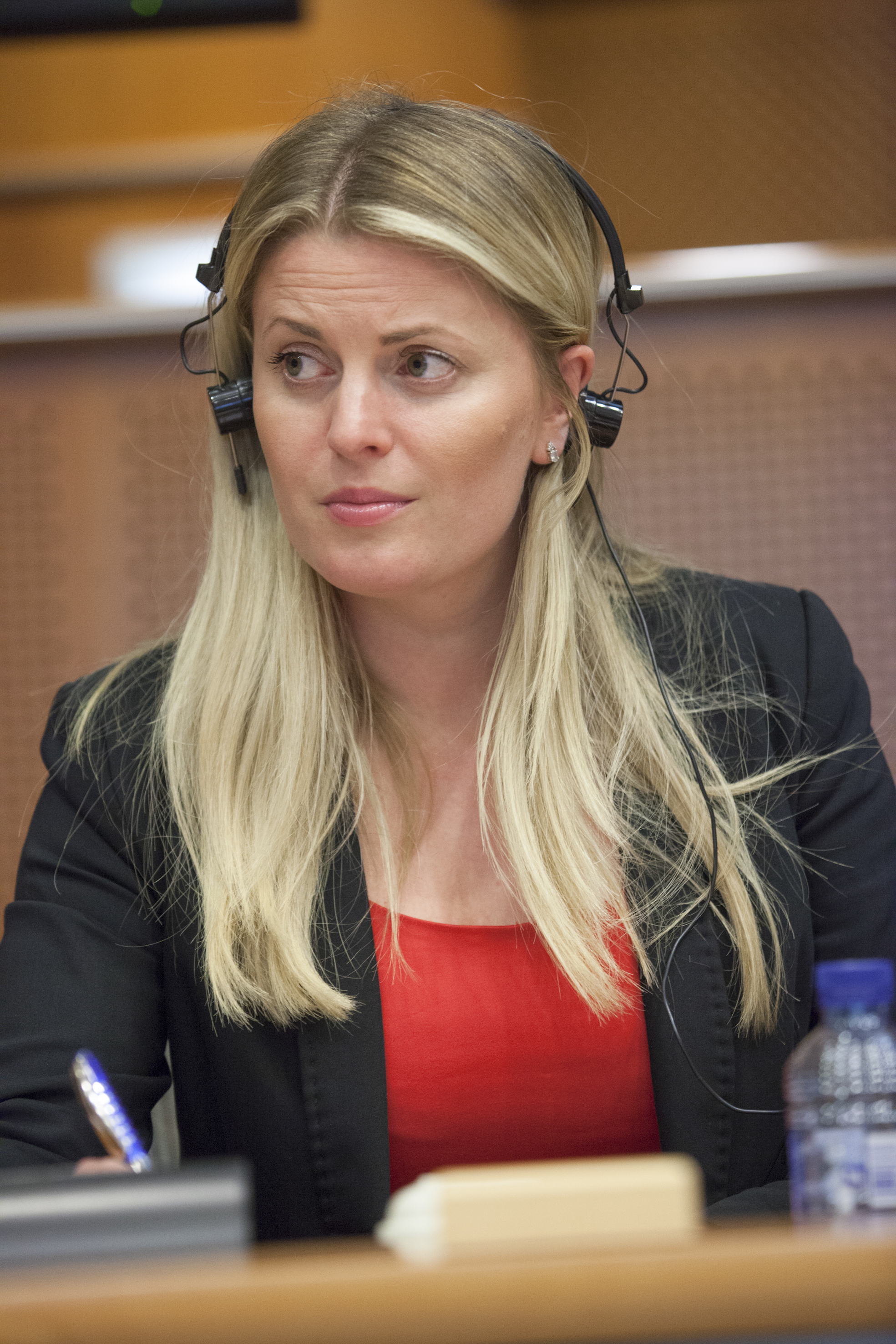
Emma McClarkin

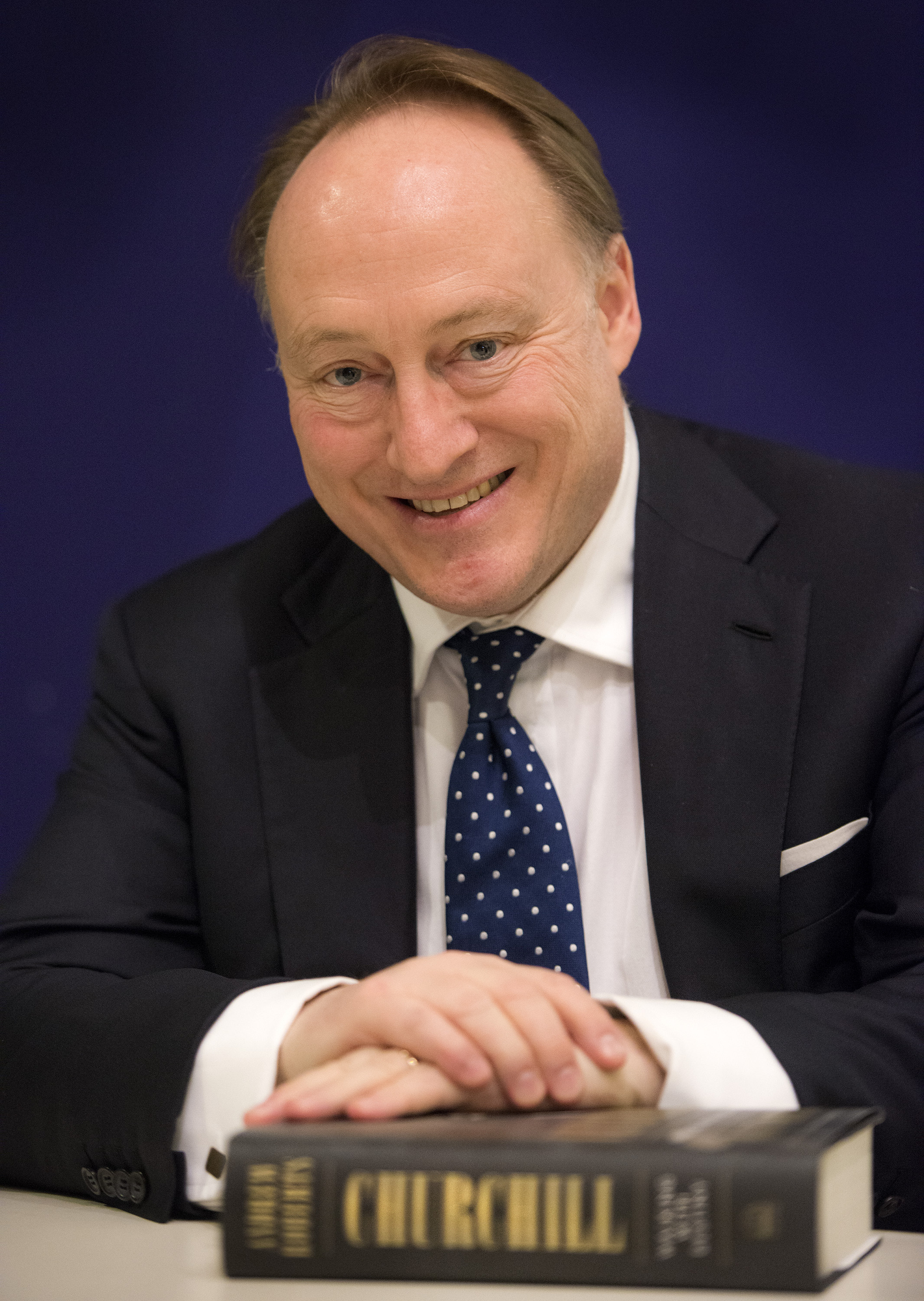
Andrew Roberts

=== Parties ===
- British Unionist Party, a Scottish unionist political party
- Libertarian Party, a libertarian political party
- Conservative and Unionist Party, a centre-right to right-wing political party
- The Social Democratic Party, a left-wing nationalist political party

=== Current MPs ===
- Alex Davies-Jones, MP for Pontypridd
- Antony Higginbotham, MP for Burnley
- Andrew Rosindell, MP for Romford
- Ed Davey, MP for Kingston and Surbiton, former Energy Secretary, and Leader of the Liberal Democrats.

=== Former MPs ===
- Boris Johnson, former MP for Uxbridge and South Ruislip, former mayor of London, former Prime Minister of the United Kingdom (2019–2022).
- Richard Bacon, MP for South Norfolk
- Brendan Clarke-Smith, MP for Bassetlaw
- David Howell, former Secretary of State for Energy, for Transport, Minister of State in the Foreign Office, former MP for Guildford
- Julian Brazier, former MP for Canterbury from 1987 to 2017
- John Redwood, MP for Wokingham
- Dehenna Davison
- Katherine Fletcher, MP for South Ribble
- Michael Fabricant, MP for Lichfield
- Bill Grant, MP for Ayr, Carrick and Cumnock
- Bob Seely, MP for Isle of Wight
- Virendra Sharma, MP for Ealing Southall
- Paul Bristow MP for Peterborough and formerly Chair of the All-Parliamentary Group for CANZUK.

=== Former MEPs ===
- Emma McClarkin, former Conservative MEP for East Midlands
- Jonathan Arnott, former Brexit Party MEP for North East England

=== Mayors ===
- Ben Houchen, Conservative Mayor of the Tees Valley

=== Lords Temporal ===
- Conrad Black, former newspaper publisher
- Stewart Jackson, former MP for Peterborough
- Daniel Hannan, Conservative MEP for South East England, founder of Vote Leave and President of Conservative Friends of CANZUK
- David Frost, Baron Frost

=== Academics ===
- Andrew Roberts, historian, journalist, and visiting professor at the Department of War Studies, King's College London and a Lehrman Institute Distinguished Lecturer at the New York Historical Society
- Jeremy Black, historian and a professor of history
- Madsen Pirie, researcher and author

=== Journalists ===
- John O'Sullivan, conservative political commentator, journalist, and a senior policywriter and speechwriter in 10 Downing Street for Margaret Thatcher
- Tim Montgomerie, political activist, blogger, and columnist

=== Organisations ===
- Adam Smith Institute
- The Bruges Group
- Institute of Economic Affairs
- Royal Commonwealth Society
- The Freedom Association
- Conservative Friends of CANZUK
- Conservatives for CANZUK

== International ==
=== Academics ===
- Derrick Gosselin, chairman of the Belgian Nuclear Research Center SCK-CEN, vice chairman of the von Karman Institute for Fluid Dynamics, fellow of the Royal Academy of Belgium

=== Activists ===
- Maajid Nawaz, author and founder of the Quilliam Foundation think-tank.

=== Journalists ===
- James C. Bennett, fellow at the Hudson Institute
- Roger Kimball, editor and publisher of The New Criterion

=== Organisations ===
- CANZUK International
