= Rodney Davis (politician) =

American politician (born 1970)

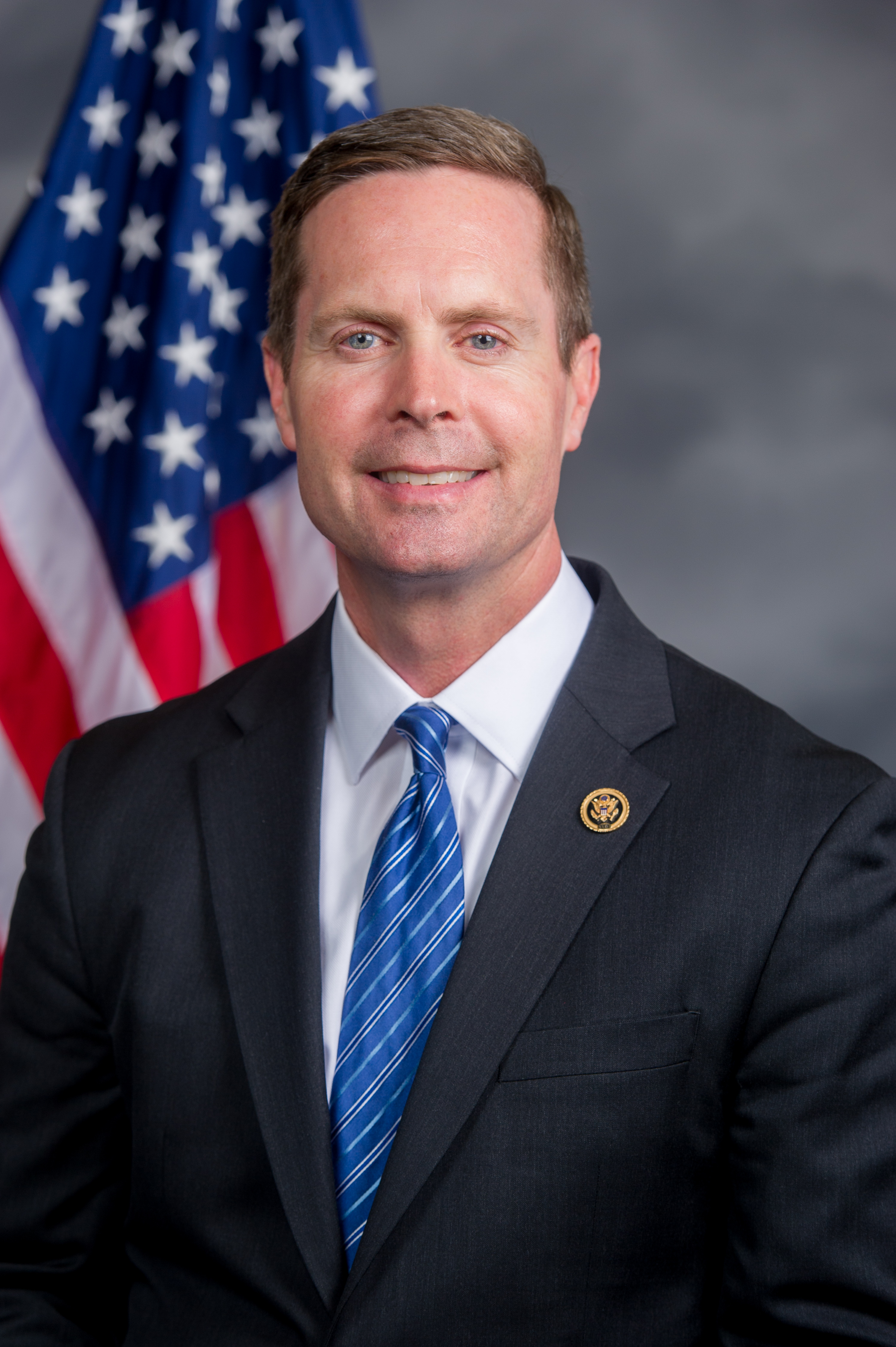
- Official portrait, 2016

Ranking Member of the House Administration Committee
- In office January 3, 2019 – January 3, 2023
- Preceded by: Bob Brady
- Succeeded by: Joseph Morelle

Member of the U.S. House of Representatives from Illinois's 13th district
- In office January 3, 2013 – January 3, 2023
- Preceded by: Tim Johnson (redistricted)
- Succeeded by: Mary Miller (redistricted)

Personal details
- Born: Rodney Lee Davis; January 5, 1970 (age 56) Des Moines, Iowa, U.S.
- Party: Republican
- Spouse: Shannon Davis (m. 1995)
- Children: 3
- Education: Millikin University (BA)
- Davis's voice Davis supporting the Postal Service Reform Act. Recorded February 8, 2022

Rodney Lee Davis (born January 5, 1970) is an American politician and lobbyist who served as the U.S. representative for Illinois's 13th congressional district from 2013 to 2023. Davis's tenure ended when redistricting led to a primary race in the Illinois's 15th against fellow incumbent Mary Miller.

In July 2024, Davis joined the U.S. Chamber of Commerce as their head of governmental affairs.

== Early life and education ==
Davis was born in Des Moines, Iowa. He graduated from Millikin University in 1992 with a degree in political science.

== Early political career ==
In 1996, he lost a race for the state legislature. In 1998, Davis managed Illinois Congressman John Shimkus's first reelection campaign. After the successful campaign, he accepted a position on Shimkus's congressional staff.

In 2000, Davis lost his campaign for mayor of Taylorville, Illinois. Davis served as Shimkus's projects director while running for Congress.

== U.S. House of Representatives ==
=== Elections ===
==== 2012 ====
On May 19, 2012, the Republican County Chairmen for the 14 Illinois counties the 13th district comprises nominated Davis as the Republican candidate for Congress. This district had previously been the 15th, represented by six-term incumbent Republican Tim Johnson. Johnson had announced in April that he would not seek reelection, just days after winning the Republican primary. Other finalists for the nomination were Jerry Clarke, chief of staff to fellow U.S. Representative Randy Hultgren and Johnson's former chief of staff; Erika Harold, a lawyer and winner of Miss America in 2003; and Kathy Wassink, a businesswoman. Davis was coaching his sons' little league baseball game when he was informed that he had been nominated. His home in Taylorville had previously been in Shimkus's 19th District (which had been renumbered as the 15th). But the new 13th had absorbed much of the old 19th's northern portion, including Taylorville.

In the general election, Davis defeated Democratic nominee David M. Gill by 1,002 votes (0.3%). Independent candidate John Hartman received around 21,000 votes (7.2%).

==== 2014 ====
On June 13, 2013, former Miss America Erika Harold announced she would run against Davis in the March 18 Republican primary.

The Republican field included Davis, Harold, and Michael Firsching. Davis won the primary with 55% of the vote.

Davis faced Democratic nominee Ann Callis in the November 4 general election. He was reportedly a top target for the Democrats but won with 59% of the vote.

==== 2016 ====
Davis was reelected in 2016, defeating Ethan Vandersand in the primary and Democratic nominee Mark Wicklund and independent David Gill in the general election. He received 59.7% of the vote.

==== 2018 ====
On March 20, 2018, Betsy Londrigan won the Democratic primary in District 13 with over 45% of the vote, beating Erik Jones, David Gill, Jonathan Ebel, and Angel Sides.

In May 2018, the American Federation of Government Employees endorsed Davis for reelection. AFGE District 7 National Vice President Dorothy James said, "We hope that Representative Davis will continue his good work on Capitol Hill for years to come and are happy to announce our support for him today."

On November 6, Davis was reelected, 50.4% to 49.6%. He lost the district's shares of Champaign, McLean, and Sangamon Counties, but carried Christian and Macon Counties. His margins in both far exceeded his overall margin of 2,058 votes.

During a debate, Davis said that The Washington Post fact-checker had found Londrigan's claims about the impact of Obamacare's repeal on preexisting conditions to be false. The Washington Post fact-checker responded, "Republicans are twisting an unrelated fact check and are misleading voters."

==== 2020 ====
Davis ran for a fifth term and was unopposed in the Republican primary. Londrigan ran again, and easily won the Democratic primary. Although most forecasters considered the race a tossup due to the close margin in 2018, Davis won reelection by 9 points. His larger margin of victory was attributed to both an increase in turnout from the district's Republican-leaning rural counties, and a decrease in the district's college campuses. Londrigan attempted to tie Davis to President Trump, and he linked her to Illinois House Speaker and state Democratic Party chair Mike Madigan, who was broadly unpopular.

Trump's 2020 presidential campaign named Davis one of four "honorary state chairs."

==== 2022 ====
After the 2020 United States census, new congressional maps were drawn, eliminating Republican-leaning districts. Davis' old district was made significantly more Democratic by adding most of the core of Metro-East, the Illinois side of the St. Louis area. At the same time, his home in Taylorville was drawn back into the 15th district, represented by Shimkus' successor, Mary Miller. Although Davis' home was drawn into the district while Miller's home was drawn just outside of it, Miller handily defeated Davis in the Republican primary.

=== Tenure ===
On June 14, 2017, Davis was one of several Republicans who were practicing for the Congressional Baseball Game for Charity at a baseball field in Alexandria, Virginia, when a gunman opened fire, wounding Representative Steve Scalise and several others. Since the shooting, Davis has made it his mission to promote more civility in politics.

Since 2019, the Lugar Center and Georgetown University McCourt School of Public Policy's Bipartisan Index has rated Davis the most bipartisan member of Congress from Illinois. For the First Session (2021) of the 117th Congress, he was rated the 22nd most bipartisan member of Congress nationwide. In the 116th Congress (2019–2020), he was rated the 14th most bipartisan member of Congress nationwide.

Davis introduced the Hire More Heroes Act of 2013 into the House on November 13, 2013. The bill would allow employers to exclude veterans receiving health insurance from the United States Department of Defense or the United States Department of Veterans' Affairs from their list of employees. This would have kept their list of employees shorter, allowing some small businesses to fall underneath the 50 full-time employees line that would require them to provide their employees with healthcare under the Affordable Care Act. Davis said that the bill "gives our small businesses another incentive to hire veterans, which helps to address the increasing number of unemployed veterans, while providing them with some relief from Obamacare."

Davis voted to repeal the Affordable Care Act. He voted to reauthorize the Violence Against Women Act.

Davis voted for H.J.Res.59 – Continuing Appropriations Resolution, 2014, which resulted in the government shutdown of 2013. After the vote, Politico reported that Davis also intended to vote for a bill that would end the shutdown, stressing that an agreement needed to be made and that "Like most of those I represent, I remain opposed to Obamacare, but a government shutdown is absolutely unacceptable."

Davis voted to lift a ban on travel to Cuba. In June 2016, he cast the deciding vote on a bill to continue to allow undocumented immigrants brought to the U.S. as children to join the U.S. military. The program would give those who serve a quicker pathway to citizenship.

During the 115th Congress, Davis was a member of the Republican Main Street Partnership and chaired the Republican Main Street Caucus.

During the presidency of Donald Trump, Davis voted in line with Trump's stated position 88.8% of the time. As of September 2021, Davis had voted in line with Joe Biden's stated position 25.7% of the time.

On May 4, 2017, Davis voted again to repeal the Affordable Care Act and pass the American Health Care Act (AHCA).

Davis voted for the Tax Cuts and Jobs Act of 2017. He said the bill would improve the economy without increasing the deficit, and that Americans would see "more money in the pockets" by February 2018 as a result of the bill.

In June 2018, Davis said, "we've got to stop this politicizing everything like dinner", adding, "Donald Trump was elected, in my opinion, because of this move toward making everything politically correct in this country."

On December 18, 2019, Davis voted against both articles of impeachment against Trump.

On January 6, 2021, Davis was at the U.S. Capitol to certify the Electoral College vote count when Trump supporters stormed the building. Davis and his staff went into hiding under police lockdown for over four hours during the attack. After the Capitol was secure and Congress resumed session, Davis certified the election without objection. As a result of the attack, Trump was impeached a second time. Davis voted against impeachment, saying, "there must be accountability for leaders who deliberately misled the public, but I fear that without thoughtful and clear-eyed leadership from both sides of the aisle, we are in danger of further violence and political unrest." In the wake of the attack, Davis objected to metal detectors which were placed outside the House chamber.

On May 19, 2021, Davis was one of 35 Republicans who joined all Democrats in voting to approve legislation to establish the January 6 commission meant to investigate the storming of the U.S. Capitol.

In July 2021, Davis was among five Republicans Minority Leader Kevin McCarthy selected to serve on the Select Committee on the January 6 Attack on the Capitol. After Speaker Nancy Pelosi rejected two of the selections, McCarthy pulled all five, including Davis.

In November 2021, Davis voted against censuring Paul Gosar, a House member who had shared an animated video of himself killing a fellow member of Congress and assaulting the president. When a majority of the House voted to censure Gosar, Davis criticized Pelosi, saying she had "torn the fabric of this House apart".

=== Committee memberships ===
- Committee on Agriculture
  - Subcommittee on Biotechnology, Horticulture, and Research
  - Subcommittee on Commodity Exchanges, Energy, and Credit
- Committee on House Administration
- Committee on Transportation and Infrastructure
  - Subcommittee on Highways and Transit
  - Subcommittee on Railroads, Pipelines, and Hazardous Materials

=== Caucus memberships ===
- Climate Solutions Caucus
- Republican Governance Group
- Veterinary Medicine Caucus

== Political positions ==
=== Defense ===
In 2020, Davis introduced the Counting All Military Votes Act, which is to ensure the absentee votes of active-duty and deployed military personnel are returned by election day.

=== Agriculture ===
Davis served on both the 2014 and 2018 Farm Bill conference committees. He authored a section of the latter bill which allowed farmers to choice between two risk management programs.

Davis supports increased federal agricultural research funding.

=== Economy ===
In April 2018, Davis expressed concern about the impact of proposed tariffs on Illinois soybean farmers and other Illinois agricultural workers, but was glad that Trump had given Secretary of Agriculture Sonny Perdue "a lot of free rein". Davis highlighted unfair Chinese trade practices and noted the adverse effect on the domestic steel industry. In June, he reiterated concern about some of Trump's proposed tariffs' impact on his constituents as well as their impact on certain foreign countries. Although he felt "the president was right to actually address the steel discrepancy that he saw from countries like China", he wished that Trump "would focus on...actors like China rather than punishing our allies".

=== Gun policy ===
In March 2018, in the wake of the Stoneman Douglas High School shooting, Davis said the shooting could have been prevented if the perpetrator had been charged with a felony for bringing a gun to school earlier. Davis said he believed more funding should be directed to mental health programs and that loopholes in background checks should be closed, but that he did not see banning guns as a solution.

=== Immigration ===
In June 2018, Davis said he hoped to co-sponsor a bill that would address the separation of adult illegal immigrants at the Mexican border from the children accompanying them. He expressed optimism that Congress could come up with a compromise on the issue.

In 2021, Davis voted for the Farm Workforce Modernization Act of 2021, which passes work visas for farm workers.

Davis supports DACA.

Davis voted for the Further Consolidated Appropriations Act of 2020, which authorizes DHS to nearly double the available H-2B visas for the remainder of FY 2020.

Davis voted for the Consolidated Appropriations Act (H.R. 1158), which effectively prohibits Immigration and Customs Enforcement from cooperating with the Department of Health and Human Services to detain or remove illegal alien sponsors of Unaccompanied Alien Children.

=== Abortion ===
Davis opposes abortion except in cases of rape or incest or to protect the health of the mother.

=== Foreign policy ===
Davis was one of 129 House Republicans who voted to condemn President Donald Trump's withdrawal from Syria.

In 2021, Davis voted against the repeal of the 2002 Authorization of Military Force against Iraq.

=== Vaccination ===
Davis voted for the Immunization Infrastructure Modernization Act of 2021. The bill helps create confidential, population-based databases that maintain a record of vaccine administrations.

=== LGBT rights ===
In 2019 and in 2021, Davis voted against the Equality Act.

In 2015, Davis was one of 60 Republicans voting to uphold President Barack Obama's 2014 executive order banning federal contractors from making hiring decisions that discriminate based on sexual orientation or gender identity.

In 2016, Davis was one of 43 Republicans to vote for the Maloney Amendment to H.R. 5055, which would prohibit the use of funds for government contractors who discriminate against LGBT employees.

In 2021, Davis was one of 29 Republicans to vote to reauthorize the Violence Against Women Act. This bill expanded legal protections for transgender people, and contained provisions allowing transgender women to use women's shelters and serve time in prisons matching their gender identity.

In 2021, Davis was one of 33 Republicans to vote for the LGBTQ Business Equal Credit Enforcement and Investment Act.

On July 19, 2022, Davis was one of 47 House Republicans who voted for the Respect for Marriage Act, which would codify the right to same-sex marriage in federal law.

== Electoral history ==
2012 Illinois's 13th congressional district election
Party	Candidate	Votes	%
Republican	Rodney Davis	137,034	46.55
Democratic	David M. Gill	136,032	46.21
Independent	John Hartman	21,319	7.24
Total votes		294,385	100.0

2014 Illinois's 13th congressional district election – Republican primary
Party	Candidate	Votes	%
Republican	Rodney Davis (incumbent)	27,816	54.63
Republican	Erika Harold	20,951	41.15
Republican	Michael Firsching	2,147	4.22
Total votes		50,914	100.0

2014 Illinois's 13th congressional district election
Party	Candidate	Votes	%
Republican	Rodney Davis (incumbent)	123,337	58.66
Democratic	Ann E. Callis	86,935	41.34
Total votes		210,272	100.0

2016 Illinois's 13th congressional district election – Republican primary
Party	Candidate	Votes	%
Republican	Rodney Davis (incumbent)	71,447	76.95
Republican	Ethan Vandersand	21,401	23.05
Total votes		92,848	100.0

2016 Illinois's 13th congressional district election
Party	Candidate	Votes	%
Republican	Rodney Davis (incumbent)	187,583	59.66
Democratic	Mark D. Wicklund	126,811	40.34
Total votes		314,394	100.0

2018 Illinois's 13th congressional district election
Party	Candidate	Votes	%
Republican	Rodney Davis (incumbent)	136,516	50.38
Democratic	Betsy Dirksen Londrigan	134,458	49.62
Write-in votes	Thomas J. Kuna (Jacob)	7	0.00
Total votes		270,981	100.0

2020 Illinois's 13th congressional district election
Party	Candidate	Votes	%
Republican	Rodney Davis (incumbent)	181,373	54.46
Democratic	Betsy Dirksen Londrigan	151,648	45.54
Total votes		333,021	100.0

2022 Illinois's 15th congressional district election – Republican primary
Party	Candidate	Votes	%
Republican	Mary Miller (incumbent)	64,549	57.4
Republican	Rodney Davis (incumbent)	47,852	42.6
Total votes		112,401	100.0

== Personal life ==
Davis and his wife Shannon wed in 1995, and live in Taylorville, Illinois. They have three children.

Davis coached Taylorville Junior Football, is a member of the Taylorville Optimist Club, and serves on the Christian County Senior Center's board of directors. He played catcher for the GOP team in the Congressional Baseball Game.

After leaving Congress, Davis joined Cozen O'Connor Public Strategies.

U.S. House of Representatives
Preceded by Judy Biggert	Member of the U.S. House of Representatives from Illinois's 13th congressional district 2013–2023	Succeeded by Nikki Budzinski
Preceded by Bob Brady	Ranking Member of the House Administration Committee; 2019–2023	Succeeded by Joseph Morelle
Party political offices
Preceded by Pat Tiberi	Chair of the Republican Main Street Caucus; 2017–2021	Succeeded by Don Bacon; Mike Bost; Pete Stauber
U.S. order of precedence (ceremonial)
Preceded by Cheri Bustos as Former U.S. Representative	Order of precedence of the United States as Former U.S. Representative	Succeeded by Ben Erdreich as Former U.S. Representative
