= John Berthoud =

American taxpayer advocate

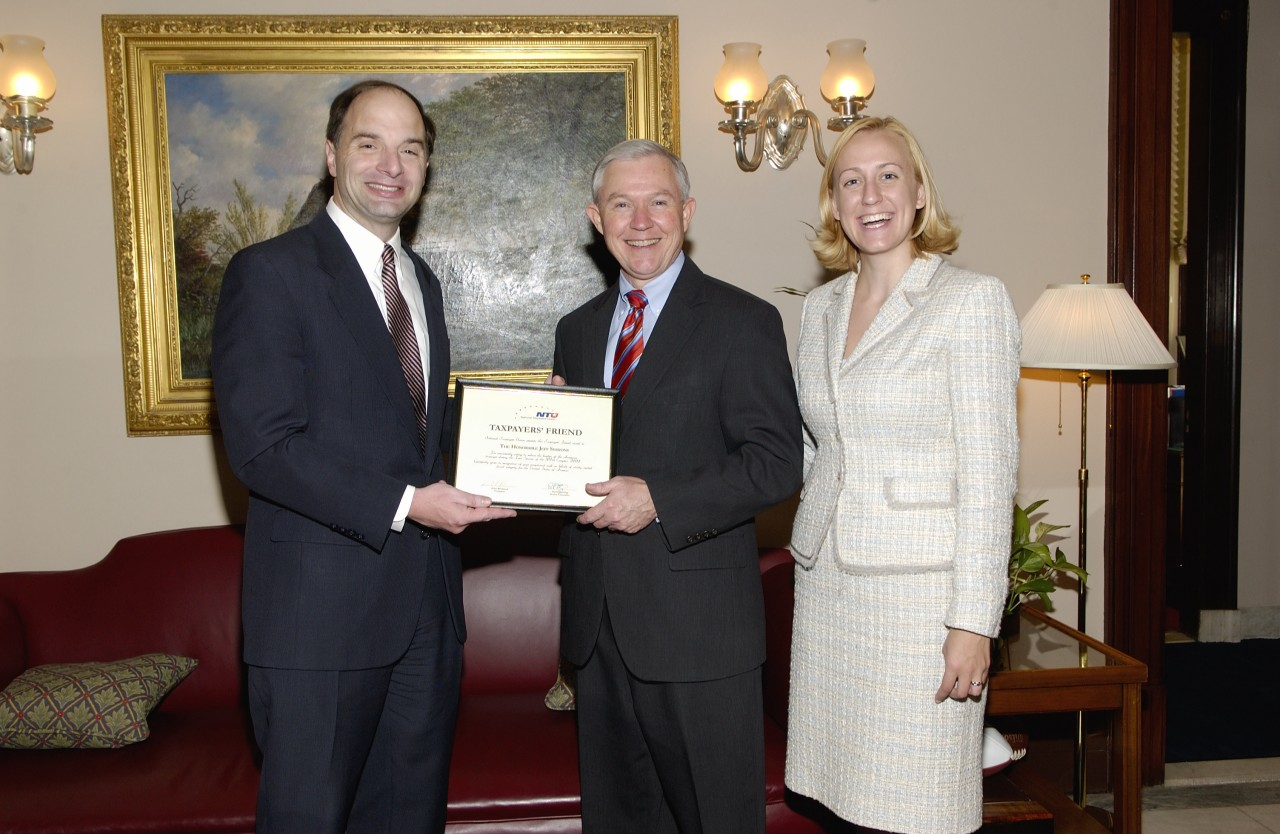
- Berthoud with Jeff Sessions and Kristina Rasmussen in 2006
- Born: May 23, 1962; West Hartford, Connecticut, U.S.
- Died: September 27, 2007 (aged 45)
- Education: Georgetown University (BA); Columbia University (MA); Yale University (PhD)
- Organization: National Taxpayers Union

John E. Berthoud was president of the National Taxpayers Union from 1997 until his death on September 27, 2007.

== Education and career ==
Berthoud was born in West Hartford, Connecticut on May 23, 1962. Berthoud earned a B.A. in government from Georgetown University, a M.A. in international affairs from Columbia University, and a Ph.D. in political economy from Yale University.

Berthoud served as vice president and senior fellow at the Alexis de Tocqueville Institution. Berthoud was an adjunct lecturer at George Washington University, teaching budgetary policy and politics. In the early 1990s, Berthoud served as legislative director for tax and fiscal policy at the American Legislative Exchange Council (ALEC).

Berthoud served on the board of the World Taxpayers Associations and the American Conservative Union. He was a contributing editor to Human Events.

== National Taxpayers Union ==
Berthoud was best known for his leadership of the National Taxpayers Union (NTU) and National Taxpayers Union Foundation (NTUF). He authored NTUF's first Issue Brief in 1998, which concluded that had term limits been in place for the U.S. Senate, the Balanced Budget Amendment would have easily passed instead of falling just one vote short. Subsequently, Berthoud would conduct analyses concluding, among other things, that tax relief opponents in Congress were motivated by the desire to spend more money on federal programs than any concern over budget deficits.

== Death ==
Berthoud died of natural causes on September 27, 2007. The Washington Times obituary quoted former House Majority Leader Dick Armey, chairman of FreedomWorks, saying "We fought a number of important battles side by side with John over the years...Freedom has lost a champion."
