= Kepner Income Tax =

Proposed tax system in the United States

The Kepner Income Tax is an approach to taxation, suggested in the United States, that would collect on a progressive income tax with no deductions, credits or exemptions, and an estate tax. It would repeal the corporate tax and payroll taxes, including Federal Insurance Contributions Act tax (FICA). All income, from any source, would be taxed the same (i.e., whether income from wages, dividends, interest or capital gains). The plan was proposed by Hayden Kepner of the law firm Arnall Golden Gregory.

Kepner states that such a tax system would be transparent, easily understandable, could fit on a post-card, and everyone who earns an income would pay taxes. The plan would expand the tax base and he suggests that it would have an incentive to keep federal spending at modest levels (under our current system, approximately 50% pay no income taxes and may not have the incentive to try to keep federal spending in control). The personal income tax would be made up of three progressive rates: 15%, 25%, and 35% (locked together to prevent raising of one rate without raising the others). The estate tax would apply an annual wealth tax of 1-2%, which would be similar to property taxes currently administered at the state level, but would include all property (i.e., stocks, bonds, real property) above a threshold amount.

== Predicted effects ==
=== Tax burden visibility ===
Supporters assert that the proposal would make the cost of federal government visible. Under the current tax system, the federal government collects revenue through a wide variety of taxes on individuals and businesses. Thus the cost of government is spread out among many different avenues and may not be fully visible to individual citizens. For example, corporate taxes and compliance costs are passed partially from producers to final consumers when producers include those costs in the retail price of goods and services. Proponents claim that the Kepner income tax would reduce the "K Street tax lobbyist's" ability to influence legislators to manipulate the U.S. tax code for the benefit of their clients. The plan does not prevent future changes by Congress; however, due to the transparency of the tax, the American people would be aware of changes to the tax base from exemptions because a change in tax rate would likely be reflected. Politicians would have to justify to the American people any tax increase or decrease. In addition, the Kepner tax would remove the use of tax exemptions for corporate welfare.

=== Effect on international business locality ===
Global corporations consider local tax structures when making planning and capital investment decisions. Lower corporate tax rates and favorable transfer pricing regulations can induce higher corporate investment in a given locality. Such investment translates into higher economic growth. Ireland's real GDP growth was almost three times higher than the European Union average between 1991 and 2000. During the decade, Ireland taxed corporate profits from manufacturing at 10%, the lowest in the EU. The United States currently has the highest combined statutory corporate income tax rate among OECD countries. The Kepner tax would eliminate the corporate income tax, which supporters argue would make the United States a tax haven and boost the economy.

== Critique ==
Critics claim that the Kepner Income Tax system could penalize work and discourage saving and investment. Phil Hinson stated that the Kepner tax would provide many benefits over the current system; however, Hinson argued that the tax rates would need to be higher than the FairTax proposal (often criticized by Kepner), that special interests would manipulate the tax, and that no formal proposal or research exists. The principles of an income tax are also argued by critics. Frank Chodorov wrote "... you come up with the fact that it gives the government a prior lien on all the property produced by its subjects." The government "unashamedly proclaims the doctrine of collectivized wealth. ... That which it does not take is a concession."

== See also ==
- Income tax in the United States
- Tax reform
