= Americans Standing for the Simplification of the Estate Tax =

American advocacy group

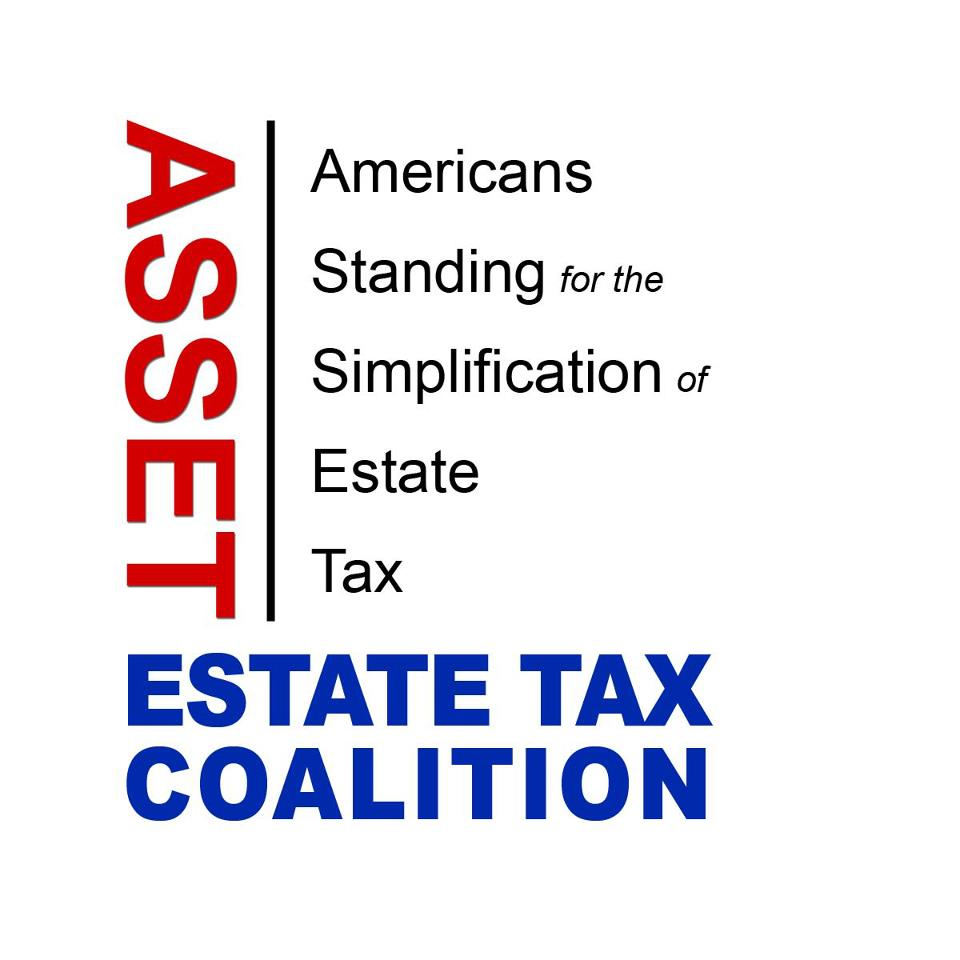
- Abbreviation: ASSET
- Formation: 2010
- Type: Advocacy group
- Headquarters: 11411 Rockville Pike
- Location: Kensington, Maryland
- Region served: United States
- President: Rob Smith
- Website: estatetaxsimplification.org

Americans Standing for the Simplification of the Estate Tax (ASSET) is a lobbying group of individuals and private businesses, which advocates changing the collection method for the estate tax in the United States. ASSET works with think tanks, elected officials and lobbyists on Capitol Hill to bring about an option that would change the existing estate tax laws.

== History ==
The group was founded in 2010 by Jack Fitzgerald, an entrepreneur and chairman of a chain of dealerships called Fitzgerald Auto Malls, which is based in Kensington, Maryland. Fitzgerald created ASSET after building a network of active car dealerships after the 2009 bankruptcy of General Motors and Chrysler. ASSET has conducted meetings and briefings with lawmakers on Capitol Hill in addition to two major studies on what they claim to be the economic benefits of the ASSET proposal to change the collection method for the estate tax.

ASSET advocates for a collection of state tax revenues for the Internal Revenue Service (IRS). Fitzgerald's original plan called for eliminating the estate tax upon death and instead enacting an annual 1.77% surcharge on the adjusted gross income of the wealthiest 1% of the population. The group claims that the IRS would achieve the same amount of annual revenue that the IRS receives from the collection of the estate tax. In 2013, the ASSET proposal was changed to an entirely voluntary system in which taxpayers would opt-in to pay a 1% surcharge on annual income while they are alive and no estate tax would be owed upon their death, but for capital gains on inherited assets. The group claims that their proposal for estate tax reform would eliminate the need for sheltering assets in unproductive trusts to avoid the tax as well as the need to over-purchase life insurance, which they say diverts resources away from investment and job creation.

The proposal by ASSET has been guided by Rep. Steny Hoyer, Rep. Chris Van Hollen, and Senator Ben Cardin in Maryland. In late September 2013, ASSET hosted a discussion panel on the estate tax that was moderated by Tax Foundation President Scott Hodge, with panelists Grover Norquist from Americans for Tax Reform (ATR), Chuck Marr from the Center for Budget and Policy Priorities, and former Senator Bob Bennett (R-UT). At the panel, Bennett stated that ASSET's plan for reforming the estate tax offered the best solution for all worlds, saying that it offered a voluntary collection method and did not force itself upon the taxpayers. Also at the panel, Norquist, who is an advocate for full repeal of the estate tax, added that he approved of ASSET's proposal, and that it should be part of the discussion on estate tax reform. In April 2014, ASSET called on the federal Ways and Means Committee to include estate tax reform as a part of a more comprehensive reform effort.

On Thursday, December 11, 2014, Rep. Andy Harris (R-MD) introduced the American Solution for Simplifying the Estate Tax Act, or ‘ASSET Act', of 2014 (H.R. 5872). The bill was introduced into the U.S. House of Representatives in the 113th Congress and has since been referred to the House Committee on Ways and Means.

== Structure ==
ASSET is a 501 (c)(4) non-profit organization, which was founded in 2010 in order to advocate for a change in the collection method for the federal estate tax. Fitzgerald remains in the role of chairman of ASSET. In 2011, ASSET hired former U.S. Representative Phil English, a Pennsylvania Republican who was a member of the tax-writing House Ways and Means Committee, as a lobbyist. The day-to-day functions and activities conducted by ASSET are led by its president, Rob Smith, and Jordan Silverman, a former researcher at Adventist HealthCare who joined in 2014.

== The ASSET proposal ==
Under the ASSET proposal the value of an estate is determined by economic and market conditions. Death is not treated as an economic event as it is under current federal tax law. The ASSET proposal eliminates death as a taxable event by allowing individuals to make what the group describes as a down payment on their estate taxes during their earning years. The assets in these individuals' estates would later be taxed at the capital gains rate at the time of the actual sale, regardless of how long the individual has been deceased. This program would be completely voluntary and therefore would not involve a new tax being imposed by the United States Congress. Those taxpayers who opt in to the ASSET plan would pay surcharge on their annual income while they are alive and no estate tax would be assessed once they have died, only when an heir sells an asset.

Diana Furchgott-Roth, former chief economist for the U.S. Department of Labor and a senior fellow at the Manhattan Institute, mentioned the ASSET proposal as one to be considered when discussing estate tax reform. She said that state taxes levied on family farms and businesses could necessitate the sale of those entities to pay the tax, so changing the timing of taxation would enable families to pass their business on rather than sell.

Since 2000, high earners in the U.S. have been able to avoid an estimated $100 billion in gift (taxes) and estate taxes through tax code loopholes. ASSET claims that their plan would eliminate loopholes in the current estate tax code, as well as the need for wealthy taxpayers to shelter their assets in trusts to avoid estate taxes upon death. By eliminating incentives for the high earners to hide assets from the IRS through unproductive tax avoidance schemes, ASSET says that such individuals will therefore have to contribute their fair share of taxes to the U.S. Treasury. The group says that its plan is revenue neutral, and described it as permanent solution to the problems of the current estate tax collection method. The group asserts that the proposal would cost the taxpayers nothing.
