= National Taxpayers Union =

American conservative advocacy organization

- Abbreviation: NTU
- Formation: 1977
- Founder: James Dale Davidson
- Tax ID no.: 52-1009116
- Legal status: 501(c)(4)
- Headquarters: Washington, DC, U.S.
- Coordinates: 38.898359°N 77.010754°W
- Members: 362,000
- President: Pete Sepp
- Vice presidents: Brandon Arnold, Andrew Moylan, Leah Vukmir, Rob Shrum, Kevin Glass
- Chairman: Robert Solt
- Subsidiaries: National Taxpayers Union Foundation, Investor Protection
- Revenue: $4.99 million (2024)
- Expenses: $3.52 million (2024)
- Endowment: $1.4 million (2024)
- Employees: 30 (2024)
- Volunteers: 40 (2024)
- Website: www.ntu.org

The National Taxpayers Union (NTU) is a taxpayer advocacy organization and taxpayers union in the United States, founded in 1977 by James Dale Davidson. NTU says that it is the oldest taxpayer advocacy organization in the nation. It is closely affiliated with a non-profit foundation, the National Taxpayers Union Foundation (NTUF). The organization has ranked politicians on their perceived fiscal responsibility, supporting lower taxes and other forms of limited government.

== Overview ==
The National Taxpayers Union has worked to enact constitutional limits on government taxes, spending and debt. The organization also played a role in federal income tax indexing and the passage of a Taxpayer Bill of Rights.

The NTU favors either a Flat Tax or the FairTax (a national sales tax with rebate) for the United States, as opposed to the current income tax system. The organization argues in favor of the line-item veto for the president. NTU generally opposes crop subsidies by the government (such as for sugar and ethanol). The organization's briefs and policy papers oppose the federal estate tax and support deregulation. NTU also provides information on "Congressional & Executive Pay/Perks" (e.g., NTU estimates the public pensions payments for Members of Congress), and NTU has called for reforms to deny a publicly funded pension to Members of Congress convicted of a felony.

According to the Institute for Justice, NTU has a staff of about two dozen employees.

== Legislation ==
=== Opposed ===
- Temporary Debt Limit Extension Act (S. 540; 113th Congress) – a bill that would suspend the United States debt ceiling until March 15, 2015. The National Taxpayers Union opposed this bill and criticised politicians from both parties saying, "this year, as the limit approached, most Democrats refused to discuss the debt problem at all. Republicans opted to stress important, though mostly unrelated policy goals, thus failing to focus on the key issue at hand." NTU expressed the opinion that spending reforms should be dealt with, instead of just increasing the debt limit.

=== Supported ===
- Digital Accountability and Transparency Act of 2014 (S. 994; 113th Congress) – a bill that aims to make information on federal expenditures more easily accessible and transparent. The bill would require the U.S. Department of the Treasury to establish common standards for financial data provided by all government agencies and to expand the amount of data that agencies must provide to the government website, USASpending. The NTU urged Representatives to vote in favor of the bill, saying that "this legislation would take an important step toward greater accountability to taxpayers by providing more information on how their hard-earned dollars are spent." The NTU argued that "the DATA Act would bring increased transparency to a system that is too often rife with favoritism, waste, and fraud. As the federal government continues to make heavy demands on the public's paychecks, taxpayers deserve the opportunity to find out more details about how the money they send to Washington is being spent."
- American Research and Competitiveness Act of 2014 (H.R. 4438; 113th Congress) – a bill that would amend the Internal Revenue Code to modify the calculation method and the rate for the tax credit for qualified research expenses that expired at the end of 2013 and would make that modified credit permanent. NTU "urged" Representatives to vote in favor of the bill because it "would simplify and make permanent the 20 percent tax credit for research and development expenses." The NTU argued that making this tax credit permanent was "an important step toward creating a healthier business climate, providing broad-based relief, and promoting economic growth." The NTU also argued that it was important for the credit to become permanent because major research and development investments often take multiple years to do and it can be difficult to plan them when a tax credit is only going to last for one or two years.

== Activities ==
- Balanced Budget Amendment – NTU has been a proponent for a Balanced Budget Amendment (BBA) to the Constitution.
- Government Spending Transparency – The National Taxpayers Union has been a proponent of the "Google Government" movement. More specifically, the organization calls for the creation of searchable Internet databases that provide information on state government grant and contract expenditures.

NTU is a founding sponsor of www.ShowMeTheSpending.org, a website dedicated to online government spending transparency.

- NTU Rates Congress – NTU rates U.S. Representatives and Senators on their congressional votes. NTU Rates Congress includes "every vote that significantly affects taxes, spending, debt, and regulatory burdens on consumers and taxpayers." NTU then assigns weights to the votes, reflecting the importance of each vote's effect on federal spending, when calculating each officials score.

A grade of "A" indicates the organization views the member as a strong supporter of responsible tax and spending policies. The organization gives these members of Congress the "Taxpayers' Friend Award."

Senator Jim DeMint receives Taxpayers' Friend Award, 2007

- Research – NTU writes policy papers on many subjects they view as important to taxpayers. The organization also sends issue briefs to its members throughout the country outlining topics and issues that might be of interest to them.
- NoTaxHikers.org – NTU launched www.NoTaxHikers.org in fall 2008. The site asks visitors to pledge not to vote for tax hikers.
- Keep The Caps – NTU launched www.KeepTheCaps.com and BillionDollarBaseball.org in fall 2013. The campaign sought to foster grassroots support and pressure Congress to maintain the spending caps created in the Budget Control Act two years prior.

== History ==
James Dale Davidson began the organization in 1969. In 1970, Davidson hired A. Earnest Fitzgerald, a United States Air Force analyst, as the president of NTU.

In 1977, the National Taxpayers Union Foundation was chartered to be the educational affiliate of the National Taxpayers Union in order to provide information about the benefits of lower taxes and limited government. In 1978, Grover Norquist was named executive director; after his departure in 1982, he was replaced by former Maryland State Senate Majority Leader George Snyder.

In 1991, The National Taxpayers Union Foundation's signature project, the BillTally, was started to reveal the legislative spending agendas of Members of Congress by analyzing the costs and savings of nearly every bill that they sponsor and cosponsor. BillTally provides the public and media with the only comprehensive look at how individual Members of Congress want to spend your tax dollars.

In 1997, Davidson left NTU; John Berthoud was named president and served until his death in late 2007. Duane Parde was named president of the organization following the death of Berthoud.

The current President of the National Taxpayers Union is Pete Sepp. Taking over the position in 1988, Sepp has made Congressional testimonies, policy papers, initiated tax revolts and played a role in the creation of the Balanced Budget Constitutional Amendment. Through appearances on Fox, CNN and CNBC as well as publications such as the Wall Street Journal and USA Today, Sepp has made a large impact over his time in the Presidency. He states, "We here at NTU promise to fight for taxpayers, so as to ensure that all Americans are able to pursue their dreams without the heavy hand of government holding them back." Together with board chair Rob Solt, and executive vice-president Brandon Arnold, the operations team of the National Taxpayers Union work towards favorable legislative outcomes for America's taxpayers such as less unnecessary government spending, tax reforms and free enterprise.

There was a National Taxpayers Union conference held from June 11–13 in 2009 held in Arlington, VA at the Hyatt Regency Crystal City Hotel. The convention was geared toward taxpayer activists who were working on taxpayer initiatives at a local and state level. The purpose of this conference was to keep the initiatives of the National Taxpayers Union alive and to get more of the public to understand their ideas.

== See also ==
- Americans For Fair Taxation
- Americans for Tax Reform
- Citizens for Tax Justice
- Leah Vukmir, vice president of state affairs for the NTU
- State Policy Network – a U.S. national network of free-market oriented think tanks of which NTU is an associate member
- Tax Foundation
