= Research & Experimentation Tax Credit =

General business tax credit

The Credit For Increasing Research Activities (R&D Tax Credit) is a general business tax credit under Internal Revenue Code Section 41 for companies that incur research and development (R&D) costs in the United States. The R&D Tax Credit was originally introduced in the Economic Recovery Tax Act of 1981 sponsored by U.S. Representative Jack Kemp and U.S. Senator William Roth. Since the credit's original expiration date of December 31, 1985, the credit has expired eight times and has been extended fifteen times. The last extension expired on December 31, 2014. In 2015, Congress made permanent the research and development tax credit in a measure of the government spending bill.

== Qualified research, history and definitions ==
With widespread concern that U.S. economic performance had fallen well below its potential, Congress passed 'The Economic Recovery Tax Act' (ERTA) of 1981. The ERTA was intended to act as an economic stimulus that would encourage investment within the United States. Congress perceived that research spending declines had adversely affected the Country's economic growth, productivity gains, and competitiveness within the global marketplace (defined by the fall of the U.S. automaker). Included within the ERTA was a provision called the 'Credit for Increasing Research Activities' (the Credit). The Credit was tailored to reverse the decline in U.S. research spending by providing an incentive that was premised on benefiting increases in (as opposed to total) year over year research spending.

Originally embodied within House Report No. 97-201 (H.R. 4242) and then later codified by The Tax Reform Act of 1986, 'Qualified Research' generally constitutes private sector or commercially driven development effort intended to yield innovation within a scientific or technological field. However, administrative difficulties coupled with divergent interpretations by the IRS and Taxpayers have led to a series of revisions to the Code Section and related Treasury Regulations.

In practice, 'Qualified Research' is often reduced to a "Four Part Test" to provide a frame of reference. However, this can be misleading due to the number of requirements or elements within each "Test" and the extensive Regulations that were provided to supplement some parts of Section 41 with examples. This convention belies the need for fact intensive evaluations and documentation of taxpayer research efforts over a period of time on the business component level (see below). This evaluation can be further complicated by a large body of case law and the need to reconcile research activities with allowable expenditures.

=== Four-part test ===
Generally, qualified research is an activity or project undertaken by a taxpayer (directly or through direct funding of a third party on the taxpayers behalf) that comprises each of the four distinct elements:

Permitted Purpose: The purpose of the activity or project must be to create new (or improve existing) functionality, performance, reliability, or quality of a business component. A business component is defined as any product, process, technique, invention, formula, or computer software (see exclusion for internal use software below) that the taxpayer intends to hold for sale, lease, license, or actual use in the taxpayer's trade or business.

Elimination of Uncertainty: The taxpayer must intend to discover information that would eliminate uncertainty concerning the development or improvement of the business component. Uncertainty exists if the information available to the taxpayer does not establish the capability of development or improvement, method of development or improvement, or the appropriateness of the business component's design.

Process of Experimentation: The taxpayer must undergo a systematic process designed to evaluate one or more alternatives to achieve a result where the capability or the method of achieving that result, or the appropriate design of that result, is uncertain as of the beginning of the taxpayer's research activities. Treasury Regulations define this as broadly as conventional implementation of the scientific method to something as informal as systematic trial and error process.

Technological in Nature: The process of experimentation used to discover information must fundamentally rely on principles of the physical or biological sciences, engineering, or computer science. A taxpayer may employ existing technologies and may rely on existing principles of the physical or biological sciences, engineering, or computer science to satisfy this requirement.

=== Exclusions ===
Notwithstanding the general application and evaluation of the requirements stated above, the following do not constitute qualified research.

- Research conducted after the beginning of commercial production of the business component;
- Adaptation of existing business components;
- Duplication of existing business components;
- Reverse Engineering;
- Surveys, studies, activity relating to management function/technique, market research, routine data collection, or routine testing/quality control;
- Software developed for internal use except software developed by (or for the benefit of) the taxpayer primarily for the taxpayer's use in selling, general, and administrative expenses and limited to financial management functions, human resources management functions, and support service functions.
- Foreign research conducted outside the United States, the Commonwealth of Puerto Rico, or any possession of the United States;
- Research related to social sciences, arts, or humanities;
- Research to the extent funded by any grant, contract, or otherwise by another person (or governmental entity).

== Research & Experimentation Tax Credit Calculation ==
The Research and Experimentation Tax Credit hinges on the quantification of eligible expenses during one of three possible base periods. The three base period calculation methods are referred to as the Traditional Credit Calculation, Start-Up Credit Calculation, and Alternative Simplified Credit.

=== Eligible expenses ===
The eligible expenses or qualified research expenditures include four types of expenses. The quantification of each of these varies based on each company's accounting methodologies.

==== Wages ====
41(b)(2)(D)Wages for in-house research and development activities usually constitute the majority of expenses eligible for the credit. The research expenditure is only eligible if the wage is paid to the employee for the performance of a qualified service. Qualified Services consist of:

- engaging in qualified research
- directly supervising qualified research
- supporting qualified research

"Engaging in qualified research" means the direct conduct of research and development. "Directly supervising qualified research" is the first-line supervision of qualified research. This does not include the higher-level managers to whom the first-line supervisors report. "Supporting qualified research" includes an employee's time spent aiding the direct conduct of research and development. This includes data recording, prototype building, and performing test/trials.

Companies must provide contemporaneous documentation that links an employee's time directly to a project or activity. This documentation takes the form of two methods; Project Approach and Departmental Approach. The project approach relies on a taxpayer's time tracking documentation to directly link an employee's hours to a specific qualified R&D project. The departmental approach relies on oral testimony, contemporaneous engineering documentation, job descriptions, educational background, and other information to develop a time estimate.

==== Supplies ====
I.R.C. §41(b)(2)(C) defines the term supply to mean any tangible property other than land or land improvements, and property subject to depreciation. Supply expense must be directly linked to qualified research activities using the taxpayer's accounting system. This can include using general ledgers or job summary reports. Qualified supplies include prototypes and testing materials. The taxpayer cannot include travel, shipping, or royalty expenses as supply expenses.

==== Contract research ====
I.R.C. §41(b)(2)(B) and Treasury Regulation §1.41-2(e) requires a third party to perform a qualified research service on behalf of the taxpayer; and requires the taxpayer to make payment to the third party regardless of success. The "on behalf of" is refined by I.R.C. §1.41-2(e)(3), which requires the taxpayer to have rights into the research results. The contract research payments are included at 65% of the actual expense.

==== Basic research payments ====
I.R.C. §41(e)(2) qualifies basic research payments made to qualified non-profit organizations and institutions. Basic research refers to fundamental research that focuses on evaluating theories and hypotheses regardless of an application. Basic research payments are included at 75% of the actual expense.

=== Credit calculation ===
The R&D Tax Credit allows for three calculation methods based on the taxpayer's date of incorporation, initiation of qualified research, and ability to collect required contemporaneous documentation. The Traditional Credit Calculation and Start-Up Credit Calculation provide a credit of 20% of the taxpayers qualified research expenditures that exceed a calculated base amount. The Alternative Simplified Credit Calculation provides a credit of 14% of the taxpayer's qualified research expenditures that exceed a calculated base amount. Regardless of calculation method the base amount cannot be less than 50% of the taxpayer's current year qualified expenditures. The following sections describe the three calculation methods; Traditional Credit Calculation, Start-Up Credit Calculation, and Alternative Simplified Credit.

==== Traditional credit calculation ====
I.R.C. §41(c)(3)(A) establishes a fixed-base percentage calculation for companies that incorporated prior to January 1, 1984, and had 3 or more tax years with qualified research expenditures and revenue between January 1, 1984, and December 31, 1988. The fixed-base percentage is calculated by dividing the taxpayer's aggregate qualified research expenses by the aggregate gross receipts for taxable years beginning after December 31, 1983, and before January 1, 1989.

For purposes of the calculation, the resulting fixed-base percentage is multiplied by the average of the taxpayer's gross revenue for the 4 years prior to the calculation year. The fixed-base percentage should only change for purposes of meeting the consistency rule or adjusting for an acquisition or disposition.

==== Start-up credit calculation ====
I.R.C. §41(c)(3)(B) establishes a fixed-base percentage calculation for companies that incorporated after December 31, 1983, or had fewer than 3 years with qualified research expenditures and revenue between January 1, 1984, and December 31, 1988. The fixed-base percentage is calculated according to the code as follows.

§41(c)(3)(B)(ii)(I) 3 percent for each of the taxpayer's 1st 5 taxable years beginning after December 31, 1993, for which the taxpayer has qualified research expenses,

§41(c)(3)(B)(ii)(II) in the case of the taxpayer's 6th such taxable year, 1/6 of the percentage which the aggregate qualified research expenses of the taxpayer for the 4th and 5th such taxable years is of the aggregate gross receipts of the taxpayer for such years,

§41(c)(3)(B)(ii)(III) in the case of the taxpayer's 7th such taxable year, 1/3 of the percentage which the aggregate qualified research expenses of the taxpayer for the 5th and 6th such taxable years is of the aggregate gross receipts of the taxpayer for such years,

§41(c)(3)(B)(ii)(IV) in the case of the taxpayer's 8th such taxable year, 1/2 of the percentage which the aggregate qualified research expenses of the taxpayer for the 5th, 6th, and 7th such taxable years is of the aggregate gross receipts of the taxpayer for such years,

§41(c)(3)(B)(ii)(V) in the case of the taxpayer's 9th such taxable year, 2/3 of the percentage which the aggregate qualified research expenses of the taxpayer for the 5th, 6th, 7th, and 8th such taxable years is of the aggregate gross receipts of the taxpayer for such years,

§41(c)(3)(B)(ii)(VI) in the case of the taxpayer's 10th such taxable year, 5/6 of the percentage which the aggregate qualified research expenses of the taxpayer for the 5th, 6th, 7th, 8th, and 9th such taxable years is of the aggregate gross receipts of the taxpayer for such years, and

§41(c)(3)(B)(ii)(VII) for taxable years thereafter, the percentage which the aggregate qualified research expenses for any 5 taxable years selected by the taxpayer from among the 5th through the 10th such taxable years is of the aggregate gross receipts of the taxpayer for such selected years.

For purposes of the calculation, the resulting fixed-base percentage is multiplied by the average of the taxpayer's gross revenue for the 4 years prior to the calculation year. The fixed-base percentage should only change for purposes of meeting the consistency rule or adjusting for an acquisition or disposition.

==== Alternative simplified credit ====
For those companies that cannot adequately substantiate qualified research expenditures for the Traditional or Start-Up calculation methods, or generate fixed-base-percentages that significantly limit the credit, the I.R.C. §41(c)(5) provides an alternative calculation method. This calculation provides a credit equal to 14 percent of the current year qualified research expenses that exceed 50 percent of the average qualified research expenses for the 3 preceding taxable years. As of January 1, 2009, this calculation supplanted the Alternative Incremental Research Credit election.

Since this calculation method is an election, a taxpayer may not apply for this calculation method retroactively. Additionally, I.R.C. §41(c)(5)(C) states this election applies to all of the taxpayer's future claims unless revoked with the consent of the Secretary.

=== Special rules ===
To further supplement the calculation methods and definitions of qualified research and experimentation, the R&D Tax Credit provides special rules for various situations. The following sections briefly describe some of these special rules.

==== Consistency rule ====
In order to accurately calculate a credit, the taxpayer is required to define qualified research expenditures the same from year to year, per I.R.C. §41(c)(5)(A). If a taxpayer changes their definition of qualified expenditures due to the results of an audit, tax court case ruling, or publication of an IRS document, the tax payer must accordingly change their definition for prior years that will affect the results of one of the three calculation methods.

==== I.R.C. §280C election ====
I.R.C. §280C(c)(3) allows the taxpayer to elect a reduced credit amount thereby eliminating the requirement to deduct qualified research expenditures claimed for the R&D Tax Credit. This election can only be made on a timely return.

==== Controlled groups ====
A group of corporations that maintain more than 50% common ownership are treated as one taxpayer for purposes of the R&D Tax Credit. Special brother/sister and spouse rules factor into determining ownership.

==== Carry-forward and carry-back ====
The credits generated for the I.R.C. §41 can be carried forward 20 years and may be carried back 1 year.

== R&D Tax Credit Monetization ==
Companies can monetize the federal R&D tax credit in a few different ways. Traditionally, it is taken against income taxes. However, qualified small businesses can apply up to $500,000 to payroll and Medicare taxes each year. To qualify for the payroll tax offset, a business must have less than $5 million in revenue and be within five years of its first gross receipt.

== Legislation ==
The legislative intent for the R&D Tax Credit is to increase R&D spending in the United States. Currently separate bills are being proposed in the House of Representatives and the Senate. The House of Representatives bill, cosponsored by U.S. Representatives Kendrick Meek and Kevin Brady, H.R. 422 proposes to make the credit permanent and increase the Alternative Simplified Credit from 14% to 20%. Senators Max Baucus and Orrin Hatch are cosponsoring bill S. 1203. This bill proposes to make the credit permanent, increase the Alternative Simplified Credit from 14% to 20%, and terminate the other calculation methods.

In the 112th Congress, Representative Rush Holt is sponsoring H.R. 134 to make the R&D Tax Credit permanent.

The American Research and Competitiveness Act of 2014 (H.R. 4438; 113th Congress) was introduced into the House of Representatives during the 113th United States Congress. The bill would amend the Internal Revenue Code to modify the calculation method and the rate for the tax credit for qualified research expenses that expired at the end of 2013 and would make that modified credit permanent. The bill was supported by organizations such as the National Taxpayers Union and Americans for Tax Reform, but was opposed by the Obama Administration because it did not pay for the credits with any offsets.

== Economic effect of the credit ==
The magnitude of the R&D Tax Credit's economic effects are debated by many economists but a majority of them agree the credit does increase R&D spending in the United States. While measuring the actual effect of the credit is difficult, a 2005 study by Ernst & Young measured the amount of dollars returned to companies in the form of the R&D Tax Credit.

- 17,700 corporations claimed $6.6 billion in R&D Tax Credits on their tax returns in 2005. Approximately 11,300 C corporations and 6,400 S corporations claimed the credit.
- Corporations claiming the R&D Tax Credit in 2005 divided up by size are 29% had $1 million in assets or less, 25% with assets of $1–$5 million, 25% with assets of $5–$25 million, and 21% with assets of $25 million or more.
- 14,953 corporations with less than $50 million in total assets claimed more than $891 million in Federal Research and Experimentation Tax Credits.
- 71.2% of these corporations had a Standard Industrial Classification in some type of Manufacturing, the remaining 28.8% include Services, Information, and Agriculture.

== R&D Tax Credit Available by State ==
Many states offer the R&D tax credit which generally follows the federal regulations and IRS guidance on what constitutes Qualified Research expenditures (QREs). However, there are some states that are an exception to the federal guidelines, such as Connecticut and California. For example, Connecticut has a lower threshold defining expenditures under Section 174 which allows a greater amount of expenditures to qualify as for the R&D tax credit. California utilizes a different definition of gross receipts and only includes sales of real, tangible, or intangible property held for sale to customers in the ordinary course of the taxpayer's trade or business delivered or shipped to a purchaser within California and does not include service-related receipts, rents or interest.

== U.S. Tax Court cases ==
- Norwest v. Commissioner, 110 T.C. 454 (1998)
- Fairchild Industries, Inc. v. United States, 71 F.3d 868 (Fed. Cir. 1995), rev'd, 30 Fed. Cl. 839 (1994)
- Lockheed Martin Corp. v. United States, 210 F.3d 1366 (Fed. Cir. 2000), rev'd, 42 Fed. Cl. 485 (1998)
- Apple Computer, Inc. v. Commissioner, 98 T.C. 232 (1992), acq. in result, 1992-2 C.B. 1
- Fudim v. Commissioner, 67 T.C.M. (CCH) 3011 (1994)
- Eustace v. Commissioner. T.C. Memo 2001-66, aff'd, 312 F.3d 1254 (7th Cir. 2002)
- Union Carbide Corporation v. Commissioner, 97 T.C.M. (CCH) 1207 (2009)
- United States v. McFerrin, 570 F.3d 672, 675 (5th Cir. 2009), rev'd, 492 F. Supp. 2d 695 (2007)
- FedEx Corp. v. United States, No. 08-2423 (W.D. Tenn. 2009)
- Procter & Gamble Co. v. United States, 733 F. Supp. 2d 857 (S.D. Ohio 2010)
- Trinity Industries, Inc. v. United States, 691 F. Supp. 2d 688 (2010)
- TG Missouri Corp. v. Commissioner, 133 T.C. 278 (2009)
- Populous Holdings, Inc. v. Commissioner, Tax Court Docket No. 405-17 (December 6, 2019).
- George v. Commissioner, Tax Court Docket Nos. 27494-16, 21889-21, (Filed February 3, 2026).

== See also ==
- Canadian Scientific Research and Experimental Development Tax Credit Program
