= American Research and Competitiveness Act of 2014 =

Proposed United States law

- Long title: To amend the Internal Revenue Code of 1986 to simplify and make permanent the research credit.
- Announced in: the 113th United States Congress
- Sponsored by: Rep. Kevin Brady (R, TX-8)
- Number of co-sponsors: 8

Legislative history
- Introduced in the House as H.R. 4438 by Rep. Kevin Brady (R, TX-8) on April 9, 2014; Committee consideration by United States House Committee on Ways and Means

The American Research and Competitiveness Act of 2014 (H.R. 4438) is a bill that would amend the Internal Revenue Code to modify the calculation method and the rate for the tax credit for qualified research expenses that expired at the end of 2013 and would make that modified credit permanent.

The bill was introduced into the United States House of Representatives during the 113th United States Congress.

On May 9, 2014, the bill passed the House. It was received by the Senate on May 12, 2014, but as of December 21 it had not been placed on the calendar.

In 2015, Congress made permanent the research and development tax credit.

== Background ==
The Research & Experimentation Tax Credit or the R&D Tax Credit is a general business tax credit for companies that are incurring R&D expenses in the United States. The R&D Tax Credit was originally introduced in the Economic Recovery Tax Act of 1981 sponsored by U.S. Representative Jack Kemp and U.S. Senator William Roth. Since the credit's original expiration date of December 31, 1985, the credit has expired eight times and has been extended fifteen times. The last extension expired on December 31, 2014, and In 2015, Congress made permanent the research and development tax credit in a measure of the government spending bill.

== Provisions of the bill ==
This summary is based largely on the summary provided by the Congressional Research Service, a public domain source.

The American Research and Competitiveness Act of 2014 would amend the Internal Revenue Code to establish a permanent research tax credit that allows for: (1) 20% of the qualified or basic research expenses that exceed 50% of the average qualified or basic research expenses for the 3 preceding taxable years, and (2) 20% of amounts paid to an energy research consortium for energy research. The bill would reduce such credit rate to 10% if a taxpayer has no qualified research expenses in any one of the 3 preceding taxable years.

== Congressional Budget Office report ==
This summary is based largely on the summary provided by the Congressional Budget Office, as ordered reported by the House Committee on Ways and Means on April 29, 2014. This is a public domain source.

H.R. 4438 would amend the Internal Revenue Code to modify the calculation method and the rate for the tax credit for qualified research expenses that expired at the end of 2013. The modified credit would be made permanent. The bill would not extend the traditional calculation method and its associated 20 percent credit. It would, however, make permanent the “alternative simplified method” for calculating the tax credit for qualified research expenses and generally increase the associated credit to 20 percent of those expenses that exceed 50 percent of the average qualified research expenses for the three preceding taxable years. It also makes permanent a tax credit for basic research and energy research and changes the base period for the basic research credit from a fixed period to a three-year rolling average.

The staff of the Joint Committee on Taxation (JCT) estimates that enacting H.R. 4438 would reduce revenues, thus increasing federal deficits, by about $156 billion over the 2014-2024 period.

The Statutory Pay-As-You-Go Act of 2010 establishes budget-reporting and enforcement procedures for legislation affecting direct spending and revenues. Enacting H.R. 4438 would result in revenue losses in each year beginning in 2014.

The JCT has determined that the bill contains no intergovernmental or private-sector mandates as defined in the Unfunded Mandates Reform Act.

== Procedural history ==
The American Research and Competitiveness Act of 2014 was introduced into the United States House of Representatives on April 9, 2014 by Rep. Kevin Brady (R, TX-8). The bill was referred to the United States House Committee on Ways and Means. The bill was reported (amended) on May 2, 2014 alongside House Report 113-431.

On May 6, 2014, the Obama Administration released a statement that "if the President were presented with H.R. 4438, his senior advisors would recommend that he veto the bill."

== Debate and discussion ==
President Obama's office released a statement that said that the Administration "supports enhancing, simplifying, and making permanent the Research and Experimentation Credit... and offsetting the cost by closing tax loopholes," but that it "strongly opposes House passage of H.R. 4438, which would permanently extend and expand the R&D credit without offsetting the cost, adding to long-run deficits."

The National Taxpayers Union (NTU) "urged" Representatives to vote in favor of the bill because it "would simplify and make permanent the 20 percent tax credit for research and development expenses." The NTU argued that making this tax credit permanent was "an important step toward creating a healthier business climate, providing broad-based relief, and promoting economic growth." The NTU also argued that it was important for the credit to become permanent because major research and development investments often take multiple years to do and it can be difficult to plan them when a tax credit is only going to last for one or two years.

Americans for Tax Reform (ATR) also supported the bill, arguing that it would be "permanent tax relief for American employers" and pointing to the fact that the credit has been in existence since 1981, but businesses have always faced uncertainty about it due to Congress being forced to renew it 14 times. ATR also argued that businesses already face high corporate income tax rates and that "investment in new technologies and sources of capital is under pressure from other areas of the tax code."

== See also ==
- List of bills in the 113th United States Congress
