= Americans for Tax Reform =

Political advocacy group

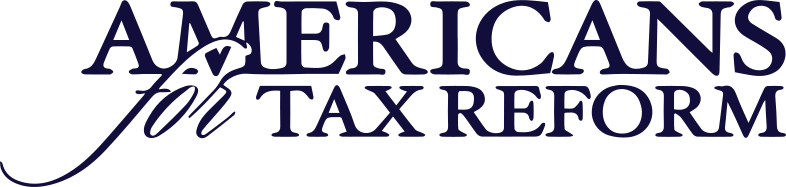
- Abbreviation: ATR
- Formation: 1985
- Type: Advocacy group
- Legal status: 501(c)(4) organization
- Headquarters: 722 12th Street NW
- Location: Washington, D.C.
- Region served: United States
- President & Founder: Grover Norquist
- Director: Michael Palicz
- Executive Director: Christopher Butler
- Revenue: $6.5 million (2024)
- Expenses: $3.6 million (2024)
- Staff: 45 (2023)
- Website: www.atr.org

Americans for Tax Reform (ATR) is a U.S. advocacy group whose stated goal is "a system in which taxes are simpler, flatter, more visible, and lower than they are today." According to ATR, "The government's power to control one's life derives from its power to tax. We believe that power should be minimized." The organization is known for its "Taxpayer Protection Pledge", which asks candidates for federal and state office to commit themselves in writing to oppose all tax increases. The founder and president of ATR is Grover Norquist, a conservative tax activist.

== Structure ==
Americans for Tax Reform is a 501(c)(4) organization with 14 employees, finances of $3,912,958, and a membership of 60,000 (as of 2004). It was founded by Grover Norquist in 1985.

The associated educational wing is the Americans for Tax Reform Foundation, which is classified as a 501(c)(3) research and educational organization. The purpose of both entities is to educate and/or lobby against all tax increases.

=== Affiliated organizations ===
Americans for Tax Reform is an associate member of the State Policy Network, a U.S. national network of free-market oriented think tanks. Americans for Tax Reform is a grantee of the Donors Trust, a nonprofit donor-advised fund.

== Projects ==
=== Taxpayer Protection Pledge ===
Since 1986, ATR has sponsored the Taxpayer Protection Pledge, a written promise by legislators and candidates for office that commits them to oppose tax increases. All candidates for state and federal office, and all incumbents are offered the Pledge. Nearly 1,400 elected officials, from state representatives, to governors, to US senators, have signed the Pledge. There are separate versions at the national and state level.

In the version for the U.S. House of Representatives, the signer pledges to:

ONE, oppose any and all efforts to increase the marginal income tax rates for individuals and/or businesses; and TWO, oppose any net reduction or elimination of deductions and credits, unless matched dollar for dollar by further reducing tax rates.

In the version for state legislators, the signer pledges that:

I will oppose and vote against any and all efforts to increase taxes.

In the 112th Congress serving in years 2011 and 2012, all but six of the 242 Republican members plus two Democratic members of the U.S. House of Representatives, for a total of 238 – a majority of that body – as well as all but seven of the 47 Republican members plus one Democratic member of the U.S. Senate, for a total of 41, have signed the Taxpayer Protection Pledge. All except 13 sitting Republicans have signed the pledge, while three Democrats have signed it (outgoing-Sen. Ben Nelson (NE) and House members Robert Andrews (NJ) and Ben Chandler (KY)).

ATR's president Grover Norquist has written about the importance of the "Taxpayer Protection Pledge" for many publications including Human Events in June 2010. In this article, Norquist writes,

Raising taxes is what politicians do when they don't have the strength to actually govern. The taxpayer protection pledge was created in 1986 by Americans for Tax Reform as part of the effort to protect the lower marginal tax rates of Reagan's Tax Reform Act of 1986. It has grown in importance as one of the few black-and-white, yes or no, answers that politicians are forced to give to voters before they ask for their vote.

The Democratic Congressional Campaign Committee (DCCC) and individual Democratic candidates began attacking "The Taxpayer Protection Pledge" and its signers during the 2010 cycle with charges that the pledge protected tax breaks for companies shipping jobs overseas. The first appearance of the argument arose in the HI-01 special election. Americans for Tax Reform responded by calling the attack ad "blatantly false." They pointed out that the Pledge does not prohibit any deduction or credit from being eliminated. It only prevents individuals and/or businesses from experiencing an overall increase in income taxes and allows for revenue-neutral tax reform.

The non-partisan, nonprofit Factcheck.org reviewed the DCCC's ad and agreed with ATR that the ad was "blatantly false." The director of Factcheck.org, Brooks Jackson, wrote

It was called "blatantly false" by Americans for Tax Reform, the Republican-leaning group that got Djou's signature on its anti-tax pledge. We agree. ATR's tax pledge does protect corporations in general – but only from an overall increase in taxes. It says nothing about jobs at all. More important, it does not rule out an overhaul of the tax code. Signers agree to oppose any "net" reduction of deductions or credits "unless matched dollar for dollar by further reducing tax rates."

According to The Hill, the Democrats' net pickup of eight seats in the House of Representatives in the November 2012 election, combined with several Republicans' disavowal of the pledge, means that the pledge will no longer have the support of a majority of that chamber when the new Congress convenes in January 2013. Norquist claims that 219 Republicans support the pledge; this figure, however, includes several Republicans who have signed the pledge only to disavow it later.

=== Ronald Reagan Legacy Project ===
Created in 1997, ATR's Ronald Reagan Legacy Project, has worked toward seeing each county in the United States commemorate the former president in a "significant" and "public" way, such as the naming of a public building. The project has also supported efforts to place Reagan on the ten-dollar bill. The project has also encouraged state governors declare February 6 to be "Ronald Reagan Day"; as of 2006, 40 governors have done so.

=== Center for Fiscal Accountability ===
Since 2008, ATR has sought to encourage transparency and accountability in government through the Center for Fiscal Accountability. The organization's mission includes supporting the creation of searchable online databases of government spending, among other initiatives.

=== Cost of Government Day ===
ATR sponsors the calculation of "Cost of Government Day", the day on which, by its calculations, "Americans stop working to pay the costs of taxation, deficit spending, and regulations by federal and state governments." Since 2008 the event has been sponsored by the Center for Fiscal Accountability.

=== Property Rights Alliance ===
The Property Rights Alliance is a project of Americans for Tax Reform. It produces the International Property Rights Index annually, ranking individual rights to own private property in countries worldwide. The index focuses on three main factors. These include: Legal and Political environment (LP), Physical Property Rights (PPR), and Intellectual Property rights (IPR). In 2021 it published a Trade Barrier Index.

=== Failure of IRS to protect confidential tax information ===
In October 2014 the ATR said that a report by the Treasury Inspector General for Tax Administration (TIGTA) found that the IRS has not been safeguarding federal tax information properly. The tax information is gathered by the IRS from the tax returns filed in the United States.

The IRS provides confidential information to over 280 federal, state and local agencies. According to this TIGTA report the IRS's Internal Revenue Manual does not require on-site validation of an agency's ability to protect federal tax information and does not set any guidelines for an agency's background investigation for accessing this information.

The TIGTA report surveyed 15 agencies that receive federal tax information and found that none of them conducted sufficient background checks on employees handling the data: one agency conducted national background investigations, four agencies fingerprint employees and only one checks the sex offender registry. Almost half of the agencies hire convicted criminals.

Federal tax information provided to other agencies must remain confidential by federal law.

=== Other projects ===
ATR has several special project lines dedicated to specific issues including The American Shareholders Association (ASA), Alliance for Worker Freedom (AWF), and The Media Freedom Project (MFP).

In October 2010 ATR began mailing fliers to voters in Florida directing them to call Florida governor and Independent candidate for Senate, Charlie Crist. ATR's mailers included pictures of Crist with Obama and quotes from right wing authors.

== Wednesday meetings ==
Shortly after Bill Clinton's 1992 election, ATR headquarters became the site of a weekly, off-the-record get-together of conservatives to coordinate activities and strategy. The "Wednesday Meeting" of the Leave Us Alone Coalition soon became an important hub of conservative political organizing. Participants each week include Republican congressional leaders, right-leaning think tanks, conservative advocacy groups and K Street lobbyists. George W. Bush began sending a representative to the Wednesday Meeting even before he formally announced his candidacy for president in 1999, and continued to send representatives after his election in 2000.

ATR has helped to establish regular meetings for conservatives nationwide, modeled after the Wednesday meetings in Washington, with the goal of creating a nationwide network of conservative activists to help support initiatives such as tax cuts and deregulation. There are now meetings in 48 states and more internationally, with meetings in Canada, Austria, Belgium, Croatia, France, Italy, Japan, Spain, and the United Kingdom.

The significance of the Wednesday meeting has influenced liberals and Democrats to organize similar meetings to coordinate activities about their shared agenda. In 2001, USA Today reported that Rep. Rosa DeLauro initiated such a meeting at the urging of then-House Democratic leader Richard Gephardt, even holding it on a Wednesday.

== Political positions ==
The primary policy goal of Americans for Tax Reform is to reduce the percentage of the GDP consumed by the government. ATR states that it "opposes all tax increases as a matter of principle." Americans for Tax Reform seeks to curtail government spending by supporting Taxpayer Bill of Rights (TABOR) legislation and transparency initiatives, and opposing Democratic efforts to overhaul health care.

ATR is a member of the Cooler Heads Coalition, which denies the scientific consensus on climate change, saying that "the science of global warming is uncertain, but the negative impacts of global warming policies on consumers are all too real." ATR supported the Comprehensive Immigration Reform Act of 2006 and continues to favor a comprehensive immigration reform bill.

ATR has called for cuts in the defense budget in order to reduce deficit spending.

=== Legislation ===
ATR supported the American Research and Competitiveness Act of 2014 (H.R. 4438; 113th Congress), a bill that would amend the Internal Revenue Code to modify the calculation method and the rate for the tax credit for qualified research expenses that expired at the end of 2013 and would make that modified credit permanent. ATR argued that the bill would be "permanent tax relief for American employers" and pointed to the fact that the credit has been in existence since 1981, but businesses had always faced uncertainty about it due to Congress being forced to renew it 14 times. ATR also argued that businesses already face high corporate income tax rates and that "investment in new technologies and sources of capital is under pressure from other areas of the tax code."

ATR supports H.R. 6246, the Retirement Inflation Protection Act of 2016. This act is designed to reduce the capital gains tax by reducing the tax on capital gains by the standardized inflation rate over the time period in which the capital was invested. ATR argues that by taxing the capital gains without taking into account the gains that occurred simply due to inflation, that investors are being punished for investing over a long period of time. The organization published an open letter to congressman urging them to vote in favor of the bill, which focuses on the harm that occurs to seniors due to the lack of protections that this bill would provide. This bill was introduced on September 28, 2016 into the U.S. Congress and as of November 2, 2016 has not been voted upon.

=== Opposition to free automatic tax return filing and other efforts to make tax filing easier ===
Tax preparation in the United States is different from that of many other countries in the world, in that the United States does not provide for taxes to be automatically filed by the tax authority. When it comes time to file taxes, the taxpayer must do it themselves personally, or pay to engage the services of a third-party tax preparer such as Intuit, even though in most cases the IRS already possesses all the information necessary to correctly file taxes for the taxpayer.

For decades, for-profit tax-preparation companies have lobbied Congress to oppose any efforts that make taxes and tax filing simpler or easier for the tax payer. ATR typically joins these efforts to oppose making taxes easier for Americans.

The average taxpayer of Europe spends 15 minutes and no money to file their annual personal taxes, whereas the average American taxpayer spends 8 hours per year and US$115. Tax preparers have a vested financial interest in taxes being difficult, with Intuit even going so far as to say in a filing with the U.S. Securities and Exchange Commission that federal and local governments making taxes easier to file was a "a continued competitive threat to our business." ATR's interests align with this in that they desire to keep taxes difficult to stoke anti-tax sentiment. That is to say, if paying taxes is "too easy", then people will be less likely to fight taxes in the way ATR wants.

Norquist and the ATR have publicly argued that things that make tax filing easier on taxpayers constitute an automatic income tax audit on every taxpayer, and serves to keep people uninformed about how taxes work, and was an attempt by the IRS to "socialize all tax preparation in America." In a 2005 presentation to the President's Advisory Panel on Federal Tax Reform, Norquist representing the ATR argued that if taxpayers did not have to prepare their own taxes, it "would allow the government to raise revenues invisibly." While the ATR has argued against efforts that would eliminate reliance on third-party preparers, they have also argued that most Americans should not be required to pay for these third-party services.

=== CARES Act ===
During the 2020 COVID-19 pandemic, the group received assistance between $150,000 and $350,000 in federally backed small business loans from PNC Bank as part of the Paycheck Protection Program. The group stated it would allow them to retain 33 jobs. Their loan was seen as notable, since they (and especially Norquist) campaign against excess government spending and are small-government advocates.

Highlighting the loan amount, Roll Call noted that ATR and ATR Foundation pay Norquist a combined $250,000 annual salary. Norquist also previously criticized the unemployment protection of the CARES Act as "delaying recovery".

== Involvement with Jack Abramoff ==
According to an investigative report from the Senate Indian Affairs Committee on the Jack Abramoff scandal, released in June 2006, ATR served as a "conduit" for funds that flowed from Abramoff's clients to finance surreptitiously grass-roots lobbying campaigns. Records show that donations from the Choctaw and Kickapoo tribes to ATR were coordinated in part by Abramoff, and in some cases preceded meetings between the tribes and the White House.

== See also ==
- Americans for Fair Taxation
- Balanced budget
- Citizens for Tax Justice
- Fiscal conservatism
- National Taxpayers Union
- Tax Foundation
- Americans Standing for the Simplification of the Estate Tax
