= Managerial economics =

Application of economics in a business

Managerial economics is a branch of economics involving the application of economic methods in organizational decision-making process. Economics is the study of the production, distribution, and consumption of goods and services. Managerial economics involves the use of economic theories and principles to make decisions regarding the allocation of scarce resources. It guides managers in making decisions relating to the company's customers, competitors, suppliers, and internal operations.

Managers use economic frameworks in order to optimize profits, resource allocation and the overall output of the firm, whilst improving efficiency and minimizing unproductive activities. These frameworks assist organizations to make rational, progressive decisions, by analyzing practical problems at both micro and macroeconomic levels. Managerial decisions involve forecasting (making decisions about the future), which involve levels of risk and uncertainty. However, the assistance of managerial economic techniques aid in informing managers in these decisions.

Managerial economists define managerial economics in several ways:

1. It is the application of economic theory and methodology in business management practice.
2. Focus on business efficiency.
3. Defined as "combining economic theory with business practice to facilitate management's decision-making and forward-looking planning."
4. Includes the use of an economic mindset to analyze business situations.
5. Described as "a fundamental discipline aimed at understanding and analyzing business decision problems".
6. Is the study of the allocation of available resources by enterprises of other management units in the activities of that unit.
7. Deal almost exclusively with those business situations that can be quantified and handled, or at least quantitatively approximated, in a model.

The two main purposes of managerial economics are:

1. To optimize decision making when the firm is faced with problems or obstacles, with the consideration and application of macro and microeconomic theories and principles.
2. To analyze the possible effects and implications of both short and long-term planning decisions on the revenue and profitability of the business.

The core principles that managerial economist use to achieve the above purposes are:

- monitoring operations management and performance,
- target or goal setting
- talent management and development.

In order to optimize economic decisions, the use of operations research, mathematical programming, strategic decision making, game theory and other computational methods are often involved. The methods listed above are typically used for making quantitate decisions by data analysis techniques.

The theory of Managerial Economics includes a focus on; incentives, business organization, biases, advertising, innovation, uncertainty, pricing, analytics, and competition. In other words, managerial economics is a combination of economics and managerial theory. It helps the manager in decision-making and acts as a link between practice and theory. Furthermore, managerial economics provides the tools and techniques that allow managers to make the optimal decisions for any scenario.

Some examples of the types of problems that the tools provided by managerial economics can answer are:

- The price and quantity of a good or service that a business should produce.
- Whether to invest in training current staff or to look into the market.
- When to purchase or retire fleet equipment.
- Decisions regarding understanding the competition between two firms based on the motive of profit maximization.
- The impacts of consumer and competitor incentives on business decisions

Managerial economics is sometimes referred to as business economics and is a branch of economics that applies microeconomic analysis to decision methods of businesses or other management units to assist managers to make a wide array of multifaceted decisions. The calculation and quantitative analysis draws heavily from techniques such as regression analysis, correlation and calculus.

== Economic theories relevant to managerial economics ==
Microeconomics is the dominant focus behind managerial economics, some of the key aspects include:

- Supply and Demand

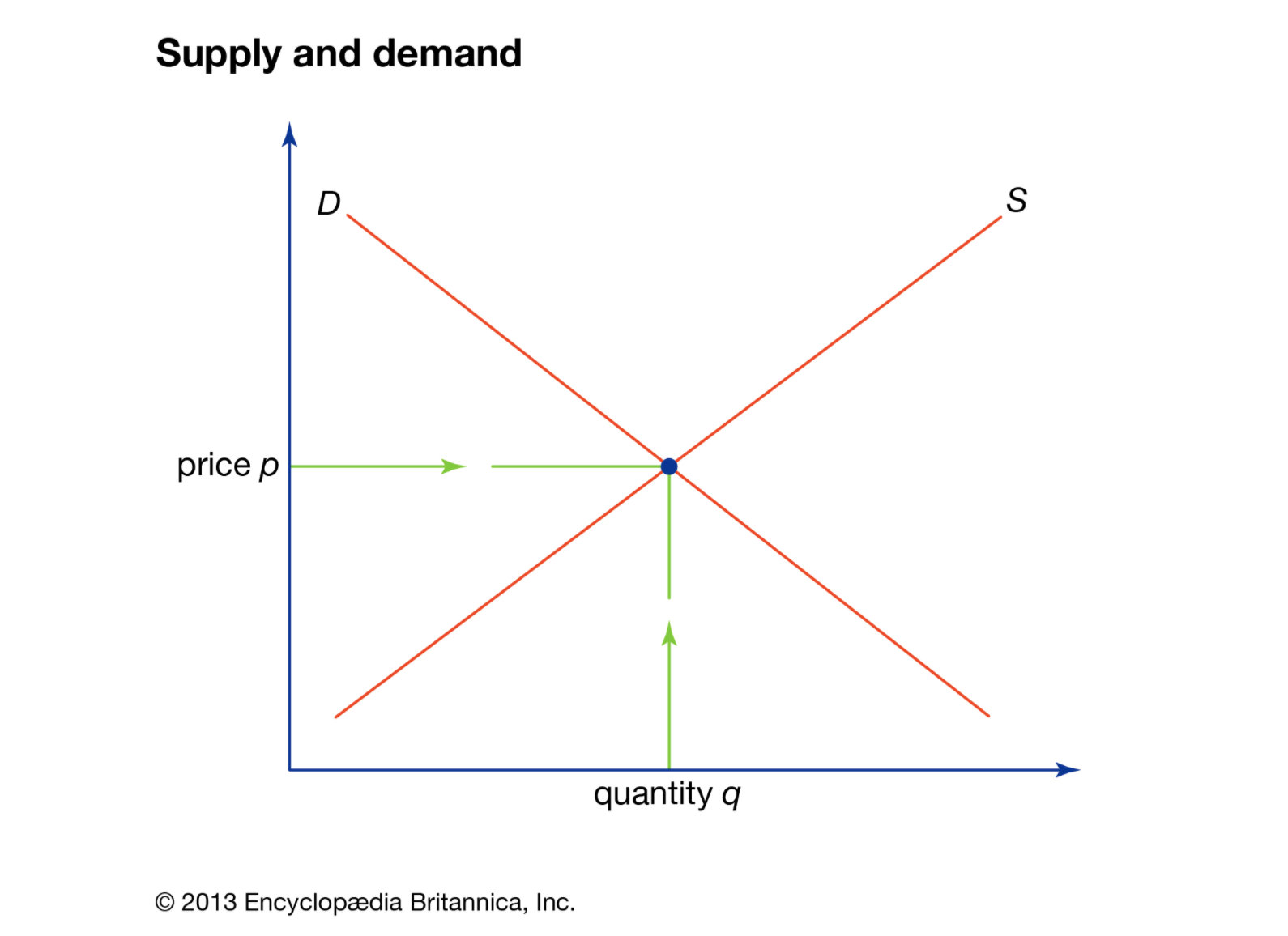
Supply and Demand Relationship

The law of supply and demand describes the relationship between producers and consumers of a product. The law suggests that price set by the producer and quantity demanded by a consumer are inversely proportional, meaning an increase in the price set is met by a reduction in demand by the consumer. The law further describes that sellers will produce a larger quantity of the good if it sells at a higher price.

Excess demand exists when the quantity of a good demanded is greater than the quantity supplied. Where there is excess demand, sellers can benefit by increasing the price. The inverse applies to excess supply.

- Production theory

Production theory describes the quantity of a good a business chooses to produce. This decision is informed by a variety of factors, including raw material inputs, labor, and capital costs like machinery. The production theory states that a business will strive to employ the cheapest combination of inputs to produce the quantity demanded. The production function can be described in its simplest form by the function $Q = F[L,K]$ where Q denotes the firm's production, L is the variable inputs and K is the fixed inputs.

- Opportunity cost

The opportunity cost of a choice is the foregone benefit of the second best choice. Determining the opportunity cost requires detailing the costs and benefits of each action the business is considering to pursue, and the cost of choosing one activity over another. The decision-maker is then in the position to choose the action with the highest payoff.

- Theory of Exchange or Price Theory

The principle uses the conjecture of supply and demand to set an accurate price for a good. The aim of price theory is to allocate a price for a good such that the supply of a good is met with equal demand for the product. If a manager sets the price of a good too high, the consumer may think it is not worth the cost and decide not to purchase the good, hence creating excess supply. The opposite occurs when the price is set too low, causing demand for a good to be greater than supply.

- Theory of Capital and Investment Decisions

Capital investment decisions are a critical factor in an enterprise. They involve determining the rational allocation of funds that will enable an organization to invest in profitable projects or enterprises to improve the efficiency of organizations. The rational allocation of funds may include acquiring business, investing in equipment, or determining whether an investment will improve the business at all.

- Elasticity of demand

The elasticity of demand is a prominent concept in managerial economics. Established by Alfred Marshall, elasticity of demand describes how sensitive a change in the quantity demanded is to a unit change in price. In his own words, Marshall describes the concept as: "The elasticity of demand in a market is great or small according to whether the amount demanded increases much or little for a given fall in price, and diminishes much or little for a given rise in price."

Microeconomic principles are useful in informing managers' decision-making. Managerial economics draws upon all of these analytical tools to make informed business decisions.

== Analytical methods used in managerial economics ==
- Price Elasticity of Demand Analysis

The price elasticity of demand is a highly useful tool in managerial economics as it provides managers with the predicted change in demand associated with an increase in the price charged for its goods and services. The price elasticity principle also outlines the changes in demand for goods with changes in the income of a populous.

$Elasticity(p) = E_{\langle p \rangle} = \frac{\Delta Q/Q}{\Delta P/P}$

Where $\Delta Q$ is the change in quantity demand for the respective change in price $\Delta P$, with Q and P representing the quantity and price of the good before a change was made. The price elasticity is important for managerial economics as it aids in the optimization of marginal revenue of firms.

- Marginal analysis

In economics, marginal refers to the change in revenue and cost by producing one extra unit of output. Both the marginal cost and marginal revenue are extremely important in economics as a firm's profit is maximized when the marginal cost is equal to the marginal revenue. Managers can make business decisions on the output level based on this analysis in order to maximize the profit of the firm.

Marginal Analysis is considered one of the chief tools in managerial economics, as it involves a comparison between marginal benefits and marginal costs to arrive at optimal variable decisions. Managerial economics uses explanatory variables such as output, price, product quality, advertising, and research and development to maximise net benefits.

- Mathematical model analysis

The use of econometric analysis has grown with the development of economics and management, as has the use of differential calculus to determine profit maximisation.

By taking the derivative of a function, the maximum and minimum values of the function are easily determined by setting the derivative equal to zero. This can be applied to a production function to find the quantity of production that maximizes the profit of the firm. This concept is important for managers to understand in order to minimize costs or maximize profits.

The main applications of mathematical models are:

- Demand forecasting. Before determining the scale of production of a certain product, enterprises need to forecast the development potential of the market. Relevant mathematical models can be created to represent the quantitative changes in the various factors affecting the development of the market, and then analyse the magnitude of the impact of these changes on demand.
- Production analysis. The input of production factors, the choice of the form of production organisation and the determination of the product structure can all be analysed and decided by creating mathematical models.
- Cost decision. Cost is a factor that directly affects profit, and is one of the most important concerns for enterprise development. An enterprise's cost level can be determined by applying mathematical models. When an enterprise changes the direction of production and operation, or expands its scale these methods can help determine the optimal level under the goal of maximising profit.
- Market analysis. The market is a fundamental concept in economics and in practice manifests itself in many different forms. Mathematical models can be created to analyse the size, price and competitive strategies that a company may choose under various market conditions.
- Risk analysis. Risk analysis is the prediction of future states. Mathematical models can be created to represent the magnitude of the various factors involved in an investment and the impact that changes in magnitude may have on the benefits.

== Decision making in managerial economics ==
As "the application of economic theory and methods to business decision-making", managerial economics is fundamentally about making decisions. The discipline is partially prescriptive in nature because it suggests a course of action to a managerial problem. Managerial economics aims to provide the tools and techniques to make informed decisions to maximize the profits and minimize the losses of a firm. Managerial economics has use in many different business applications, although the most common focus areas are related to the risk, pricing, production and capital decisions a manager makes. Managers study managerial economics because it gives them the insight to control the operations of their organizations. Organizations will function well if managers rationally apply the principles that apply to economic behavior.

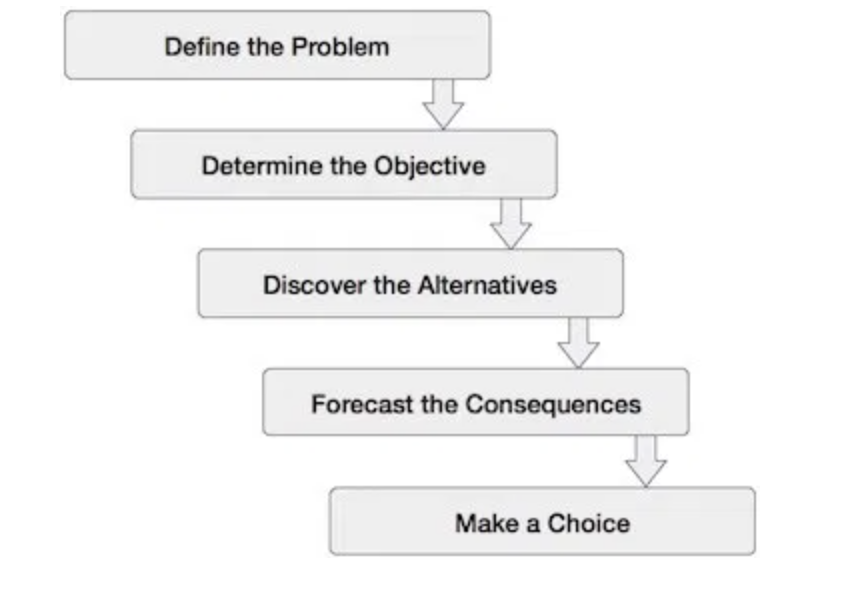

Managerial economics as a science

1. Define the Problem
  The first step in making a business decision is to understand the problem in its entirety. Without correct analysis of the problem, any solution developed will be inadequate.
  Incorrect problem identification can sometimes cause the problem that is trying to be solved.
2. Determine the Objective
  The second step is evaluating the objective of the decision, or what the decision is trying to achieve.
  This step is determining a possible solution to the problem defined in step 1. Multiple possible solutions to the problem previously identified may be established.
3. Discover the Alternatives
  After in depth analysis into what is required to solve the problem faced by a business, options for potential solutions can be collated.
  In most cases, more than one possible solution to the problem exists. For example, a business striving to gain more attraction on social media could improve the quality of their content, collaborate with other creators or a combination of the two.
4. Forecast the Consequences
  This step involves assessing the consequences of the problem's solutions detailed in step 3. Possible consequences of a business decisions could include; productivity, health, environmental impacts and risk.
  Here, managerial economics is used to determine the risks and potential financial consequences of an action.
5. Make a Decision
  After the consequences and potential solutions to the problem at hand have been analyzed, a decision can be made. At this point, the potential decisions should be measurable values which have been quantified by managerial economics to maximise profits and minimise risk and adverse outcomes of the firm. This step includes a sensitivity analysis of the solution. A sensitivity analysis of the selected solution details how the output of the solution changes with changes to the inputs. The sensitivity analysis allows the strengths and weaknesses of the designed solution to be analyzed.

== Pricing ==
It is important to understand what pricing decisions should be made regarding the products and services of the firm. Efficient pricing is required to maintain desired levels of revenue and profit, whilst also maintaining customer satisfaction. Setting a price too low reduces profitability, negatively affects the perceived quality of the product, and sets an expectation of price for the consumer. Setting a price too high may negatively affect the image of an organisation from the perspective of the consumer.

Managers may price using intuitive or technocratic decision-making styles. A technocratic approach relies on quantitative analysis and optimisation, and typically involves a compensatory method of evaluation. Compensatory evaluation allows one attribute to compensate for another attribute. For example, a manager may price a product at a lower price to compensate for its lower quality. Intuitive decision-making relies on consumer heuristics, defined as cognitive processes of fast decision-making, which occur by limiting the amount of information analysed.

Economic concepts such as competitive advantage, market segmentation, and price discrimination are relevant to pricing strategy. In order to set a price that drives sales and firm performance, managers must understand the economic environment in which they are operating.

=== Price discrimination ===
Price discrimination involves selling the same or similar good at different prices to different consumer segments. Consumer segments are separated by a significant variation in the amount they are willing to pay. In order for price discrimination to occur, firms must be able to separate customer segments according to differing price elasticities, have some market power and prevent customers from re-selling the product.

There are three classic types of price discrimination.

- First-degree price discrimination or perfect price discrimination occurs when firm's can accurately determine what each buyer is willing to pay. However, in practice this strategy is difficult to achieve as it requires full knowledge of the demand curve.
- Second-degree price discrimination occurs when firms can price products or services differently according to the number of units bought. Examples include quantity discounting, bulk pricing and two-for-one offers.
- Third-degree price discrimination prices products or services differently based on the unique demographic of different groups. Examples of third-degree price discrimination are student or senior discounts, or discounted travel tickets for last-minute buys.

Additional forms of price discrimination include bundling, intrapersonal price discrimination and purchase-history price discrimination. A firm's ability to price discriminate effectively can improve their profitability and/or increase their customer base, but only if the conditions required for price discrimination are met.

=== Psychology of pricing ===
The Psychology of Pricing is used to understand how pricing affects consumers perception of goods and their willingness to consume. The way a good is priced has implications for the perceived value of that good. Firms can capitalise on consumers willingness to pay by influencing their price perception, reducing the pain of paying and exploiting switching costs.

Consumer's price perception can be altered by priming a smaller number (e.g. pricing a good as $4.99 instead of $5), anchoring to a high reference price or separating costs into individual components (e.g. the price of the good and shipping cost).

Reducing the pain of paying involves strategies to minimise the psychological "pain" individuals feel when spending, due to human's loss averse nature. These include timing strategies, like block payments or charging before consumption, and salience strategies like digital or artificial (e.g. tokens) payments.

Finally, by exploiting switching costs, firms can increase producer surplus and/or keep a larger market share. Switching costs "result from a consumers desire for compatibility between a current purchase and previous investment". However, often consumers fail to switch to the optimal choice because of loss aversion, information deficiencies, procrastination, status-quo bias or endowment effects. This allows firms to exploit this behaviour through strategies such as honeymoon pricing (or introductory rates) and add-on pricing, which involves a cheaper initial purchase but more expensive replacement (like printers and cartridges).

The psychology of pricing provides an explanation for why consumption patterns don't always cohere with the neoclassical understanding, which assumes price and consumption have an inverse relationship. The Snob Effect, Bandwagon Effect and Veblen Effect are three counter-examples to this assumption.

- The Snob Effect occurs when consumers reduce their consumption of a good when others begin consuming it. Have attached unique perceived value to the good, this value erodes as demand increases.
- The Bandwagon Effect is the inverse. Consumers want to consume what everyone else is and therefore value goods by perceived social value rather than price.
- Under the Veblen Effect, consumers accept price as an indication of value, and therefore consume more as the price increases.

== Consumer decision making (Theories and Biases) ==
In order to successfully make organisational decisions, management must have an understanding of consumer behaviour and decision-making. Consumer behaviour relates to buying, using and selling goods, services, time and ideas by decision-making units.

=== Rational choice theory ===
Rational Choice Theory is a decision-making theory, also known as the law-and-economics theory, which applies the assumption that people will try and maximise their outcomes, have well-defined preferences and are consistently rational decision-makers. This theory develops on the Economic Man Theory, which assumed that people respond to stimuli (external factors) to generate a response (outcome). Rational Choice Theory builds on this theory by understanding that the consumer is an information processing decision-maker, however, it fails to incorporate psychological literature and empirical findings on the psychology of human-behaviour.

Rational Choice Theory makes the following assumptions:

1. Objective criteria exist to enable a consumer to determine rational choices from irrational choices.
2. Organisations and Consumers have negligible behavioural differences.
3. Consumers make decisions based on conscious consideration of factors.
4. Consumers make decisions using rational considerations.
5. Consumers decide from a stable set of preferences.
6. Consumers aim to maximise their circumstances.
7. In maximising their circumstances, consumers perform a risk assessment.
8. Satisfaction is easily assessable.

These assumptions do not account for circumstances of human error where consumers misinterpret information, or only consider portions of relevant information. The assumption of rational choice theory that when provided with all the required information, consumers will make a rational decision is limited. Instead, understanding bounded rationality, a concept explored in behavioural economics, can assist firms and managers in decision making.

=== State-dependent preferences ===
Consumer preferences depend on the state the consumer is in when making the decision. For example, food tastes better when you are hungry or attending a concert is more enjoyable if you are not injured. Most models of state-dependant preferences assume people are aware of the effect their current state has on preference formation in that moment. However, empirical studies suggest this is not always true. Several biases help explain this incongruence.

- Projection bias occurs when consumers predict that their future tastes will represent their current tastes.
- Attribution bias occurs when consumers consider past experiences in deciding whether to repeat a previously performed consumption activity. This bias can lead to systematic errors in economic decisions.
- Status quo bias occurs when consumers would rather follow previous procedures, or buy previously used products, without evidence that this choice is better than alternatives. This bias opposes the basic law of human nature, that the most adaptable species is the one to survive, and is in opposition with positive views on change expressed in business literature.

=== Cognitive biases ===
Beyond biases that influence state-dependent preferences, there is a whole host of cognitive biases that can shape consumer preferences and influence decision making. See cognitive biases for a full list. These biases can have real implications for the effectiveness of firms, public policies and choices generally.

== Incentives ==
Monetary and non-monetary incentives are used by managers to motivate employees to achieve results aligned with firms' objectives. The outcome of incentives depends on the design and the implementation process of the incentives, their interaction with intrinsic and social motivations, and the behavioural effects of their removal.

In a field experiment analyzing the effects of performance-based monetary incentives, it was shown that productivity improved in line with employees' ability, however, there was an increase in neglect of non-incentivised tasks.

Monetary incentives generally have two kinds of effects, known as the standard direct price effect, and the indirect psychological effect. The standard direct price effect makes incentivised behavior more attractive; and the indirect psychological effect makes incentivised behavior less appealing by relaying important information from principals (manager) to agents (worker) surrounding quality expectations, which can provoke unexpected behavioural outcomes.

Agents receive information from both the size and existence of incentives. For example, offering members of the community high monetary compensation to be in the presence of a nuclear waste site, indicates that there are high risks involved with the plant, making community members less willing to accept the plant even in the presence of monetary incentives. Contrarily, in a famous experiment, a childcare centre introduced a fee of $3 for parents who picked their children up late. The information conveyed to the parents from this incentive was that the small fine indicated being late is not too bad, and in the short run the number of late pick-ups increased. This information persisted when the fee was removed, and parents who had experienced the fine were more likely to pick their child up late than those who had not received the information given by the incentive.

As a general rule however, when incentives are high enough, the standard direct price effect tends to take precedence over the indirect psychological effect, unless incentives are so high that agents form a negative inference of the circumstances.

=== Pay disparity ===
Where workers are paid at a substantially lower rate to their peers, outputs and attendance can fall out of alignment with organisational objectives. Pay disparity can cause harm to an organisations social culture, cohesion and cooperation, and alter the workplace dynamic significantly. In developing countries where social interactions are heavily relied upon for economic activity, these effects are particularly undesirable. Evidence suggests these consequences can be avoided by clearly justifying pay inequality to workers. Potentially due to self-serving bias, workers are often unwilling to believe they perform at a lower standard than their peers unless shown undeniable evidence. Particularly in settings where employees do not trust their managers, workers may be inclined to suspect favouritism until they are given evidence and justifications.

Tournament theory is used to describe why different pay levels exist between different roles in the business hierarchy. The idea of tournament theory is that agents who put in effort to achieve promotions are rewarded with a higher, non-incremental, pay rate. The reward of a higher pay rate incentivizes behaviour that leads to promotions. This behaviour is often lucrative and therefore ideal for the business. Tournaments can be very powerful at incentivizing performance. Empirical research in economics and managements have shown that tournament-like incentive structure increases the individual performance of workers and managers in the workplace.

However, research has also shown that tournaments consistently disadvantage certain groups, such as women. The prevalence of tournament structured competitions for career progression provides an explanation for why women are often underrepresented in high positions. Other studies have investigated gender discrepancies in risk aversion, feedback aversion, overconfidence, self-perception of ability, negotiation skills and self-promotion as further explanations that can contribute to differences in pay despite uniform performance. Managers ability to identify the role of biases in perpetuating inequalities within the workplace can be instrumental in improving firm outcomes.

=== Game Theory ===
Game theory is the study where individuals study the different choices agents make with respect to their personal preferences, incentives and benefits.

==== Assumptions of game theory ====
1. Common Knowledge: Common knowledge is the assumption that information presented in the game is known by all players taking part in the game.
2. Rationality: The rational assumption is one where players are able to accurately weigh the cost and benefits of all the information presented subsequently making their decisions based on their assessment. Economic rationality in game theory is the assumption that the player ranks their assessments based on what would benefit them the most. Subsequently the player will choose the outcome as well as paths that best benefit themselves.

===== Strategies in game theory =====
1. Best response: The best response is the strategy (or strategies) that yields the most favourable outcome for players, with the assumption that the players have been given other strategies.
2. Nash Equilibrium: The nash equilibrium is the strategy where players have no incentive to deviate from their choices or behaviours.
3. Dominant Strategy: The strategy where no matter what the other player plays the dominant strategy will always be superior producing and dictating the outcome. Strictly dominated strategy is a strategy where the other strategy chosen always results in a lousier outcome. Weakly dominated strategy is a strategy where it produces the lousier or equivalent outcome when compared to the outcome of the alternate strategy.

===== Examples of games in game theory =====
1. Prisoners dilemma: The prisoner dilemma game provides economists with insights on disputes between individuals and group incentives that result in the outcomes being less than optimal.
2. Simultaneous games: The simultaneous game is one where players make decisions at the same time.

== Demand analysis and forecasting ==
Demand forecasting assists management in predicting future sales and revenue projection, which inform operations and marketing decisions as well future financial planning. The process of demand forecasting often uses business analytics, particularly predictive analytics, with respect to historical data and other analytical information, to make an accurate estimation. For example, using an estimate of a firm's capital expenditure and cash flow, managers can create forecasts that assist in financial planning and improve the financial health of the firm.

Effective demand management considers factors which are both within and beyond the firm's control, such as disposable income, competition, price, advertising and customer service.

Consumer choice is highly influential on demand analysis, as each consumer aims to maximise their satisfaction with a combination of goods and services, subject to their personal budget constraint. Costs of production

Production costs directly affect a firm's profitability. In order to maximise profits, firms identify the cost minimising output level for a firm where marginal cost equals marginal revenue. The most common types of costs that are factored into this decision include:

- Fixed costs
- Variable costs
- Marginal cost
- Average total cost
- Sunk costs

The impact of short-run and long run costs are important in determining production in a certain firm . It is assumed some costs are fixed in the short-run and are thus considered "fixed costs". Thus production costs are determined by variable costs. However, in the long run, all costs are variable, which allows more flexibility in changing inputs to determine the optimal level of inputs for a profit maximising output.

== Profitability management ==
Profitability management is understanding what makes a firm profitable, and what can be done to improve its profitability. It integrates finance and sales, and aims to optimize sales revenue and marginal cost of the firm. Profit management is technology enabled, as firms must be quick to respond to rapid changing market and to know the true economic cost of its products and services. Management needs to drive cooperation between different functions of the firm such as sales, marketing, and finance, to ensure the teams recognize the importance of coordinated effort. Proper planning and profitability management is key to good business management.

== Capital management ==
Capital management is the planning, monitoring, and controlling of the assets and liabilities of a firm, particularly, in an effort to maintain cash flow to meet the firm's short-term and long-term financial obligations. Proper capital management is important to the financial health of a firm, with efficient resource allocation through capital management, firms can improve its cash flow and profitability. Capital management involves tracking various ratios within the firm, most important ones include:

- Capital ratio
- Inventory turnover ratio
- Collection ratio

Rate of return and cost of capital (i.e. interest rate) are important factors of capital management.

== Implications of macroeconomics and microeconomics ==
When making decisions, managerial economics is used to analyze the micro and macroeconomic environments relating to an organization. Microeconomics considers the actions of individual firms surrounding utility maximization, whilst Macroeconomics considers the actions and behaviour of the economy as a whole. As such, both area of economics have influence in the development of managerial economic frameworks.

=== Macroeconomics ===
With regard to macroeconomic trends, the forecasting and analysis of areas such as output, unemployment, inflation and societal issues are essential in managerial economics. This is because these areas in the macroeconomy have the ability to provide an overview of global market conditions, which can be imperative for managers to understand. An example of managerial economics using macroeconomic principles is a manager choosing to hire new staff rather than training old ones in a time when the rate of unemployment is high, as the possible talent pool would be very large. The political structure of a country (whether authoritarian or democratic), political stability and attitudes towards the private sector can also affect the growth and development of organizations. This can be seen through the influence different government policies can have on management quality. In particular, policies around product market competition has been seen to significantly impact collective management practices in countries by either reducing or supporting poorly managed firms. A clear understanding of relevant markets and their different conditions is a vital task for a managerial economist, as even with market instability and fluctuations the goal is to always steer the company to profits.

Managerial economics has components of microeconomics

Managers study and manage the internal environment of organisations and work for the profitability and long-term operation of the organisation. This aspect refers to the study of microeconomics. Managerial economics deals with the problems individual organisations face, such as the organisation's main objectives, the demand for its products, the organisation's price and output decisions, available substitutes and giveaways, the supply of inputs and raw materials, the target or potential consumers of its products, etc.

=== Microeconomics ===
Microeconomics is closely related to Managerial economics through areas such as; consumer demand and supply, opportunity cost, revenue creation and cost minimization. Managerial economics inculcates the application of microeconomics application and makes use of economic theories and methods in analyzing a business and its management. Moreover, managerial economics combines economic tool and technique to solve the managerial problems.

Microeconomics also gives indication on the most effective allocation of resources the business has available. These microeconomic theories and considerations are used via managerial economics to make decisions regarding the business. By understanding the principles of microeconomics, managers can be well informed to make accurate decisions regarding the firm.

An example of managerial economics using microeconomic principles is the decision of a manager to increase the price of the goods being sold. A manager should evaluate the price elasticity of the product to equate the respective demand of the product after the price change.

== Managerial economics in practice ==
From a management perspective, managerial economics techniques are useful in many areas regarding business decision-making, most commonly including:

- Risk analysis – various models are used to quantify risk and asymmetric information and to employ them in decision rules to manage risk.
- Production analysis – microeconomic techniques are used to analyze production efficiency, optimum factor allocation, costs, economies of scale and to estimate the firm's cost function.
- Pricing analysis – microeconomic techniques are used to analyze various pricing decisions including transfer pricing, joint product pricing, price discrimination, price elasticity estimations, and choosing the optimum pricing method.
- Capital budgeting – investment theory is used to examine a firm's capital purchasing decisions.

== See also ==
- Business economics
- Personnel economics
- Management science
- Managerial finance
- Outline of management

== Journals ==
- Computational Economics. Aims and scope.
- Journal of Economics & Management Strategy. Aims and scope.
- Managerial and Decision Economics
