= Kathryn Shaw (disambiguation) =

Kathryn Shaw is a Canadian director, actor, and writer.

Kathryn, Catherine or Katherine Shaw may also refer to:

- Kathryn L. Shaw economics professor
- Katherine Shaw, lawyer
- Catherine Shaw, mathematician and fiction writer
- Catherine Shaw (curler)

== See also ==
- Kathy Shaw, American politician
- Katie Shaw (disambiguation) for those named Kate or Katie/Katy Shaw
