= M. Ishaq Nadiri =

Afghan American (born 1935)

Academic background
- Doctoral advisor: Dale W. Jorgenson

Mohammed Ishaq Nadiri (born 1935) is an Afghan American who is the Jay Gould Professor of Economics at New York University. A former department chair, he was also founder and first director of the C.V. Starr Center for Applied Economics. Professor Nadiri was a signatory of the 2001 Bonn meetings where the interim government of Afghanistan was created; a participant in the Tokyo meeting focused on funding Afghanistan's reconstruction, the White House and UN Security Council meetings during Hamid Karzai’s visit in January 2002, and the Loya Jirga in Kabul in June 2002 that resulted in Mr. Karzai's election as president. Nadiri served as Senior Economic Advisor to President Karzai. For his services and accomplishments, President Karzai awarded Nadiri with the Ghazi Amanullah Khan, the highest civilian award of Afghanistan.

== Early years ==
Nadiri emigrated from Afghanistan to the United States at the age of 19 and received his B.S. from the University of Nebraska, and his M.A. and Ph.D. from the University of California, Berkeley. He has taught at UC Berkeley, Northwestern University, University of Chicago and Columbia University. He joined New York University in 1970, has been the chairperson of the Economics Department, and founder and director of the C.V. Starr Center for Applied Economics. He was the Jay Gould Professor of Economics in 1975.

== National Bureau of Economic Research (NBER) ==
Nadiri has actively been involved with the National Bureau of Economic Research (NBER). After joining NBER in 1967 as a Research Fellow, he was promoted to Research Associate in 1969, and is currently a member of the Program in Productivity.

== Professional memberships and achievements ==
Nadiri has served as a consultant to a number of corporations, governments and international organizations. He is a member of Council on Foreign Relations, American Economic Association, C.V. Starr Center for Applied Economics, Center for Japan-U.S. Business & Economic Studies, Committee for Economic Development, Editorial Board Member of the Annals of Economics & Social Measurement. He is listed in Who's Who in Economics, Who's Who in America, Who's Who in the East, Who's Who in Finance & Industry, Who's Who in Science & Engineering, Who's Who in American Education, the Dictionary of Distinguished Leadership, Men of Achievement, 5,000 Personalities of the World, and Personalities of the Americas.

== Fields of specialization ==
Nadiri's fields of specialization are the economics of technical change and productivity growth, investment theory and modeling, monetary economics, and quantitative analysis and applied economics. He has served as a consultant to a number of corporations and organizations, including the Ford Foundation, the United Nations Conference on Trade and Development, several governmental agencies and foreign governments, and the United Nations Agencies Association.

== Publications ==
Nadiri has had more than 100 papers published in leading professional journals and several books on productivity, technological change and economic growth.

== Senior Economic Advisor to the President (SEAP) ==
Nadiri served as the Senior Economic Advisor to the President of Afghanistan (SEAP) from 2005 to 2008. He also served as Chairman of the Afghanistan National Development Strategy (ANDS) and co-chair of the Joint Coordination and Monitoring Board (JCMB). As the SEAP, Nadiri was responsible for the preparation and publication of many of the most important documents relating to development of Afghanistan, including the Interim-ANDS, the Progress Report on Preparation of the ANDS, the ANDS, the Afghanistan Compact, Afghanistan's Millennium Development Goals Report, and Reports to the JCMB. Nadiri also helped raise $32 Billion in pledges of support from the international community for the development of Afghanistan at conferences in London and Paris.

== Bibliography ==
- M. Ishaq Nadiri; Sherwin Rosen (1973). A Disequilibrium Model of Demand for Factors of Production. National Bureau of Economic Research. ISBN 978-0-87014-261-1.
- Walter C. Labys; M. Ishaq Nadiri; José Núñez de Arco (1980). Commodity Markets and Latin American Development, a Modeling Approach: Conference on Commodity Models in Latin America. National Bureau of Economic Research. ISBN 978-0-88410-481-0.
- Edward N. Wolff; M. Ishaq Nadiri (1980). A simulation model of the effects of an increase in the minimum wage on employment, output and the price level. Dept. of Economics, New York University.
- "M. Ishaq Nadiri". JSTOR.
