= German Journal of Human Resource Management =

German-language journal

- Discipline: Human resource management
- Language: English
- Edited by: Julia Brandl and Tanja Rabl

Publication details
- Former name: Zeitschrift für Personalforschung
- History: 1987–present
- Publisher: SAGE Publications
- Frequency: Quarterly
- Impact factor: 3.5 (2024)

Standard abbreviations
- ISO 4: Ger. J. Hum. Resour. Manag.

Indexing
- ISSN: 2397-0022

Links
- Journal homepage

The German Journal of Human Resource Management (GHRM, formerly: Zeitschrift für Personalforschung, ZfP) is a quarterly academic journal. It was founded in 1987 by a group of academics from German-speaking countries with the aim of strengthening the theoretical foundations and methodological rigor of the field.

The journal publishes original conceptual and empirical articles that deal with all aspects of human resource management from a variety of disciplinary perspectives, including personnel economics, industrial relations, and organizational behavior, following a double-blind review process. By promoting a multidisciplinary understanding of the management of people, work, and employment, the GHRM provides a platform for research in human resource management, personnel economics, industrial relations, and organizational behaviour.

== History and positioning ==
Originally founded as a German-language journal for human resource research, the journal is an international journal for research on human resource management. Since volume 30 (2016), the journal has been published by SAGE Publications entirely in English under the title German Journal of Human Resource Management.

The current editors describe the strategic positioning of GHRM as a permeable enclave. GHRM pursues a dual mission of local anchoring and global reach. It emphasizes local roots by inviting contributions that are rooted in German-speaking countries, examine local institutional, cultural, technological, and economic conditions (e.g., labor law, co-determination, dual vocational training system), and use these local phenomena to challenge established assumptions. At the same time, it emphasizes global reach and welcomes contributions from around the world, actively engages with human resource management research from different global contexts, enriches international human resource management debates with new and original insights, and is guided by international standards of scientific quality. GHRM serves as a social space for specific research on human resource management in the German-speaking context (e.g., dual training, co-determination).

To this end, in addition to regular research articles, the journal also publishes “Perspective Papers” and “Practice Forums.” The journal also regularly publishes special issues. Topics covered in recent years include: Pay Disclosure (2025), Common Good HRM (2024), Working from Home (2022), Always On, Never Done? (2021), and Research Paradigms in International HRM (2020).

== Editorial board ==
Since October 2025, the editors-in-chief have been Julia Brandl (University of Innsbruck) and Tanja Rabl (RPTU Rhineland-Palatinate Technical University Kaiserslautern-Landau). Over the years, the journal has been managed by various teams. The editors-in-chief are supported by an international team of associate editors and editorial board members.

== Reception and rankings ==
The journal is listed in major international databases, including the Social Science Citation Index (SSCI). In 2024, the two-year Impact Factor was 3.5 (five-year impact factor: 4.4). This places the journal in the second quartile (Q2) of the Management and Applied Psychology categories in the Web of Science. Other rankings include: The GHRM is also listed in the following rankings:

- VHB (Association of University Professors of Business Administration) Rating 2024: Category B
- WU (Vienna University of Economics and Business) Journal Rating: Category A
- ABDC (Australian Business Deans Council) List: Category B
