= Katie Shaw =

Katie, Katy or Kate Shaw may refer to:

- Katie Shaw, character in The Brotherhood of Poland, New Hampshire
- Katie Shaw, character in The Cool Mikado
- Katy Shaw, character in General Hospital (British TV series)
- Kate Shaw (Australian academic), Australian academic
- Kate Shaw, American academic

== See also ==
- Kathryn Shaw (disambiguation)
