= Kathryn L. Shaw =

American economist

Member of the Council of Economic Advisers
- In office 2000–2001
- President: Bill Clinton
- Preceded by: Cecilia Rouse
- Succeeded by: Mark B. McClellan
- Scientific career
- Education: Occidental College (BA); Harvard University (PhD)
- Children: 3
- Fields: labor economics, personnel economics
- Workplaces: Graduate School of Business, Stanford University, Tepper School of Business, Carnegie Mellon University

Kathryn L. Shaw is the Ernest C. Arbuckle Professor of Economics at the Graduate School of Business, Stanford University. Previously, she was the Ford Distinguished Research Chair and Professor of Economics at Tepper School of Business, Carnegie Mellon University. From 1999 to 2001, she served as a Senate-confirmed Member of President Bill Clinton's Council of Economic Advisers.

== Education ==
Shaw graduated from Occidental College in 1976, and completed her PhD in economics at Harvard University in 1981.

== Research ==
Shaw is the co-developer of the field of "insider econometrics," a research field within personnel economics in which researchers go within companies and use insider knowledge and data to identify the performance gains from management practices. In early work, she (and her co-authors) use production-level data from firms in the steel industry to model the effects of alternative management strategies on productivity. Recently, she has turned to studying the performance gains from new information technologies and the changes in management strategy towards product customization that enhance returns to investment. In related work on incentives in franchising, she shows how the optimal use of franchise contracts can increase brand value for franchise companies. In recent work, Shaw and her co-authors have discovered that a good boss can significantly increase the output of subordinates. This kind of promotion will continue into the future. Shaw also finds that serial entrepreneurs carry intangible capital with them when moving to a new more productive company. Her research has been extensively funded by the National Science Foundation (NSF), the Alfred P. Sloan Foundation, the Russell Sage and Rockefeller Foundations, and the Department of Labor, and has been published in the American Economic Review, as well as Management Science, among other publications.

== Recognition ==
In 1998, Shaw was the recipient of the Minnesota Award for Employment Research for the best paper in 1997–98 on the topic of employment issues. In 2001, she received the Columbia University award for the best paper on international business. From 1999 to 2001, Shaw's expertise in labor economics was recognised by an appointment as a Senate-Confirmed member of Clinton's Council of Economic Advisors. At Carnegie Mellon University, Shaw received the Award for Sustained Teaching Excellence, the Economics Department Teaching Award, was Chair of the Faculty Senate, and was Head of the Department of Industrial Management. Shaw's work has earned her the Xerox Research Chair, and she has served on a Research Panel of the NSF. She has been an editor of several academic journals, including the Journal of Labor Economics, and the Review of Economics and Statistics.

== Selected works ==
- Edward P. Lazear; Kathryn L. Shaw (2009). The Structure of Wages: An International Comparison. University of Chicago Press. ISBN 978-0-226-47051-1.
- Richard B. Freeman; Kathryn L. Shaw (2009). International Differences in the Business Practices and Productivity of Firms. University of Chicago Press. ISBN 9780226261959.
- Lafontaine, Francine, and Kathryn L. Shaw (1999). "The dynamics of franchise contracting: Evidence from panel data" (PDF). Journal of Political Economy. 107 (5): 1041–1080. doi:10.1086/250090. S2CID 154199895.
- Lazear, Edward P., and Kathryn L. Shaw (2007). "Personnel economics: The economist's view of human resources" (PDF). Journal of Economic Perspectives. 21 (4): 91–114. doi:10.1257/jep.21.4.91.
- Shaw, Kathryn L (1996). "An empirical analysis of risk aversion and income growth". Journal of Labor Economics. 14 (4): 626–653. doi:10.1086/209825. S2CID 154191374.
