= Edward Lazear =

American economist and academic (1948–2020)

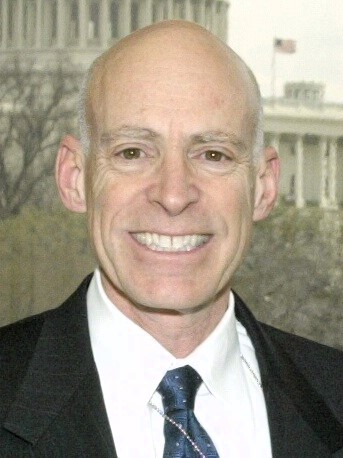

Chair of the Council of Economic Advisers
- In office February 27, 2006 – January 20, 2009
- President: George W. Bush
- Preceded by: Ben Bernanke
- Succeeded by: Christina Romer

Personal details
- Born: Edward Paul Lazear; August 17, 1948 New York City, New York, U.S.
- Died: November 23, 2020 (aged 72)
- Party: Republican
- Spouse: Victoria Lazear
- Education: University of California, Los Angeles (BA, MA); Harvard University (PhD)

Edward Paul Lazear (/ləˈzɪər/, lə-ZEER; August 17, 1948 – November 23, 2020) was an American economist, the Morris Arnold and Nona Jean Cox Senior Fellow at the Hoover Institution at Stanford University and the Davies Family Professor of Economics at Stanford Graduate School of Business.

Lazear served as chairman of the Council of Economic Advisers from 2006 to 2009. As chairman, he was the chief economic advisor to President George W. Bush, holding a cabinet-level post as part of the White House team that led the response to the 2008 financial crisis. Lazear has been called the founder of personnel economics, a field of economics that applies economic models to the study of the management of human resources in the firm. His research advanced new models of employee incentives, promotions, compensation and productivity in firms. He is also credited with developing a theory of entrepreneurship and leadership that emphasizes skill acquisition. In addition to personnel economics, Lazear was a labor economist known for his work on the educational production function, and the importance of culture and language in explaining the rise of multiculturalism.

== Early life and education ==
Lazear was born on August 17, 1948, in New York City. He grew up in a Jewish family in Brooklyn, New York, before moving to Los Altos, California. His father was a shipyard worker during World War II, and had also been a janitor at a hospital, while his mother was a salesperson at a jewelry shop. As a high school student, he worked at a hospital mailroom and was also a member of the school cross-country running team.

Lazear received a Bachelor of Arts and a Master of Arts in economics from the University of California, Los Angeles in 1971. His wife said he struggled at first, until he took an economics course and did well. He received a Doctor of Philosophy in economics from Harvard University in 1974.

== Career ==
Lazear began his career in 1974 at the University of Chicago School of Business as an assistant professor. He went on to be the Gladys J. Brown Professor of Urban and Labor Economics from 1985 to 1992. During his time at the University of Chicago, he collaborated with Gary Becker in applying economic tools to alternate domains. He worked here for twenty years before joining the faculty of the Stanford Graduate School of Business.

At Stanford University, he was the Jack Steele Parker Professor of Human Resources Management and Economics from 1995 to 2017, and he went on to be the Davies Family Professor of Economics in 2017. He had also been the Morris A. Cox Senior Fellow at the Hoover Institution since 1985. During his time here, he was the founding editor of the Journal of Labor Economics, and the founder of the Society of Labor Economists.

He served as a research fellow at the Stanford Institute for Economic Policy Research, Center for Corporate Performance at the Copenhagen Business School in Copenhagen, Denmark, and the IZA Institute for the Study of Labor in Bonn, Germany. He was the Astra-Erikkson Lecturer and the 1993 Wicksell Lecturer in Stockholm, Sweden. He had also been a research associate at the National Bureau of Economic Research since 1974. He had also been a visiting professor at the Center for the Study of New Institutional Economics at the University of the Saarland in Germany, the Institut d'Etudes Politiques in Paris, and at the Institutes for Advanced Study in Vienna and Jerusalem. He had delivered lectures across Australia, England, India, Finland, the Netherlands, Norway, and Spain.

Since leaving his post as chairman of the Bush Council of Economic Advisors, Lazear made regular appearances on CNBC and Fox Business News. He was a frequent contributor to the Wall Street Journal op-ed pages.

=== Labor and personnel economics ===
Lazear was considered one of the pioneers of labor economics, and personnel economics, branches of economics that studies market dynamics between wages and labor. His 1995 book, Personnel Economics, was a seminal work that in addition to introducing the topic, encouraged a wave of subsequent research into labor and management relations.

In a transformative paper in the American Economic Review, in 2000, he studied the relationship between incentive-based pay and productivity and concluded that a shift towards incentive-based attracted more efficient workers and contributed to an increased worker output. In a case study that examined management and workers at Safelight Glass Company, he noted that when the company moved towards a variable and incentive based pay from the earlier hourly pay, the company saw an increase in worker output and productivity by about 44%. He argued that this increase in productivity and output was not driven by workers just working harder, but, it also included substitution of the labor force, with the company attracting and holding on to more efficient workers.

In a paper earlier in his career in 1979 in the Journal of Political Economy, titled, "Why is there Mandatory Retirement?," he had explored the driving motivations behind mandatory retirement. In this paper he argued that companies should adjust the payout structures to pay less during workers' younger days when their productivity is presumably higher and they are worth more to businesses, and pay more to workers in their older days. He goes on to say that while this would mean that employees would hold on to their jobs, mandatory retirement would help solve this problem. The Congress outlawed this practice in 1986.

Lazear built on the lifetime payout thinking, and working with Professor Sherwin Rosen from the University of Chicago, introduced tournament theory as a way to allocate wages and compensation where wage differences are based not on marginal productivity but instead upon relative differences between the individuals. In a paper titled "Rank-Order Tournaments as Optimum Labor Contracts" in Journal of Political Economy in 1981, Lazear and Rosen analyzed compensation schemes in which workers' compensations are determined not by their output, but by their rank in their organization. They go on to show that in certain conditions compensation based on rank can result in efficient allocation of resources and also serve as an incentive for workers as they look to advancing through the ranks.

He was a proponent of market dynamics and efficiency and argued in favor of market-driven actions rather than wage guarantees like minimum wages and other governmental interventions. At the same time, he also argued that European state policies toward job stability among workers did not necessarily mean higher unemployment and lower productivity levels in the European labor markets. He further went on to make the case that free markets contribute to increased well-being of the poor. In an article for National Review's "Capital Matters" two months prior to his death, he goes on to quote President Kennedy to state, "a rising tide lifts all boats," implying that general economic growth benefits all population. His study also found interesting findings including the fact that when a country changes its name to drop terms like "democratic", "people's", or "socialist", there is a corresponding 18% increase in incomes of the poor.

In a commentary on the job growth in 2018, when the jobless growth rate was below 4%, he had said that the Federal Reserve did not need to intervene on fears of the economy overheating, and had suggested that economists didn't need to worry if the job growth could continue much further. The job growth went on for an additional year and a half before the coronavirus disease 2019 pandemic hit the world.

=== Role during the 2008 financial crisis ===
Lazear served as the chairman of the Council of Economic Advisors during the 2008 financial crisis and through the Great Recession. As the chief economic advisor to President Bush, he joined the White House economic team that orchestrated the policy response to the 2008 financial crisis and that restructured the financial system. Lazear's team developed the Economic Stimulus Act of 2008 which provided the first rounds of economic stimuli intended to boost the United States economy in the face of unprecedented shocks to the financial and housing sectors. The bill was implemented rapidly: passing the U.S. House of Representatives on January 29, 2008, and then the U.S. Senate on February 7, 2008, to be signed into law on February 13, 2008, by President Bush with bi-partisan support. During this period it is mentioned that he was a regular at Camp David, and accompanied President George W. Bush on bike rides in the country retreat, and had been nicknamed as 'stork' by the president.

Prior to serving as chairman of the Council of Economic Advisors, Lazear was a member of Bush's President's Advisory Panel for Federal Tax Reform, established in 2005. He had worked with nine other members on reforms to the Internal Revenue Code to provide policy options without impacting the revenue collections.

=== Other research ===
==== Educational production ====
In a paper in 2001, in the Quarterly Journal of Economics, Lazear introduced the idea of an education production function in a classroom. He stated that an optimal classroom size is larger for well behaved students, with the argument that classrooms had a public good element to them and when one student disrupts the class, learning is reduced for all students. He introduces an educational production function that maps student discipline to class size and says that this may explain why Catholic schools despite their larger sizes might outperform public schools.

Lazear also studied high-stakes testing, and educator fears that high-stakes testing will create incentives to focus on learning to the tests at the cost of not learning aspects that are less likely to be included in the tests. In a paper in the Quarterly Journal of Economics in 2006, he compares this to deterrents that deter drivers from speeding, and emphasizes the costs of learning and of monitoring. When police locations are mentioned to drivers on a freeway, speeding occurrences are reduced. So, when the fines from speeding tickets are higher relative to benefits from speeding and there are sufficient police personnel, it is better to keep the locations a secret, resulting in higher compliance levels across all locations. Similarly, with the introduction of costs of learning and costs of monitoring, he goes on to say that high cost learners will learn more when they are told of the contents of the exam. He further goes on to make a case that tests should be well defined for younger students and more amorphous for advanced students.

==== Culture and language ====
Lazear also attempted to study the rise of multiculturalism and linked it to the importance of the linkages between culture and language to the overall population. In a paper in the Journal of Political Economy, he considers culture and language as means to facilitate trade between people and goes on to state that minority populations have incentives to be better assimilated to the larger society and learn the majority language and cultural elements so as to have a larger pool of potential trading partners. Assimilation is less likely when the incoming population's culture and language is broadly represented in the larger society. He goes on to say that in a pluralistic society, governmental actions that encourage diverse cultural-immigration over concentrated immigration can increase societal welfare.

==== Entrepreneurship and skill acquisition ====
Attempting to identify attributes that enable entrepreneurship, Lazear drew a correlation between successful entrepreneurs and skill acquisition. In a paper in the Journal of Labor Economics in 2005, he states that successful entrepreneurs would need to be broad based in their skills or 'jacks-of-all-trades,' rather than excelling in any one specific skill. With data from Stanford alumni, he draws a correlation between students who have had a diverse work and educational backgrounds being more likely to be successful entrepreneurs than those who have focused on one role or on one subject.

== Awards and recognition ==
Lazear won a number of awards over his career. Among those are:

- 1994 Distinguished Teaching Award, Graduate School of Business, Stanford University
- 1998 Leo Melamed Biennial Prize, for the best research by a business school professor.
- 2003 Adam Smith Prize, European Association of Labor Economists.
- 2004 IZA Prize in Labor Economics, Institute for the Study of Labor.
- 2006 Jacob Mincer Award for Lifetime Contributions to the Field of Labor Economics.
- 2019 Elected Distinguished Fellow of the American Economic Association.

His book, Personnel Economics (MIT Press, 1995) was selected as a MIT Press Outstanding Book in 1996, and as one of the ten most important books in Labor Economics by Princeton in 1996. Professor Lazear had also received honorary degrees from Albertson College of Idaho (1997), Aarhus School of Business (2006), the University of Zurich (2010), and Copenhagen Business School (2013). Lazear was an elected fellow of the American Academy of Arts and Sciences, the American Association for the Advancement of Science, the Econometric Society, and the Society of Labor Economists. He had also been the recipient of numerous National Science Foundation grants.

== Personal life ==
Lazear was married to his wife Victoria, a litigation consultant, and had a daughter. He was known to enjoy outdoor activities, and was an avid traveler, skier and mountain biker.

Lazear died from pancreatic cancer on November 23, 2020.

== Publications ==
=== Books ===
- Lazear, Edward P. (1995). Personnel Economics. MIT Press. ISBN 978-0-262-12188-0. Chapter-preview links.
- Edward Lazear, ed. (1996). Culture Wars in America. Hoover Institution Press. ISBN 978-0-8179-5762-9.
- Lazear, Edward (1995). Economic Transition in Eastern Europe and Russia: Realities of Reform. Hoover Institution Press. ISBN 978-0-8179-9332-0.
- Lazear, Edward (2002). Education in the Twenty-first Century. Hoover Institution Press. ISBN 978-0-8179-2892-6.
- Lazear, Edward and Michael Gibbs (2009). Personnel Economics in Practice. 4th ed., Wiley. ISBN 978-0-471-67592-1. Description and preview.
- Lazear, Edward et al., ed. (2004). Personnel Economics, Elgar, with 43 articles dating from 1962 to 2000 (link to contents link here).

=== Articles/research papers ===
- Lazear, Edward P. (1979). "Why Is There Mandatory Retirement?" Journal of Political Economy, 87(6), pp. 1261-1284.
- Lazear, Edward P., and Sherwin Rosen (1981). "Rank-Order Tournaments as Optimum Labor Contracts," Journal of Political Economy, 89(5), pp. 841-864.
- Lazear, Edward P. (1986). "Salaries and Piece Rates," Journal of Business, 59(3), pp. 405-431.
- Lazear, Edward P. (1999). "Personnel Economics: Past Lessons and Future Directions," Journal of Labor Economics, 17(2), p. 233 [pp. 199-236. (Presidential address to the Society of Labor Economists.)
- Lazear, Edward P. (1999). "Culture and Language". Journal of Political Economy. 107 (S6): 95–126. doi:10.1086/250105. ISSN 0022-3808. S2CID 153720804.
- Lazear, Edward P. (2000a). "Economic Imperialism," Quarterly Journal of Economics, 115(1), pp. 99-146.
- Lazear, Edward P. (2000b). "The Future of Personnel Economics," Economic Journal, 110(467), pp. F611-F639.
- Lazear, Edward P. (2000c). "Performance Pay and Productivity," American Economic Review, 90(5), pp. 1346-1361.
- Lazear, Edward P., and Kathryn L. Shaw (2007). "Personnel Economics: The Economist's View of Human Resources," Journal of Economic Perspectives, 21(4), pp. 91-114.
- Lazear, Edward P. (2005). "Entrepreneurship". Journal of Labor Economics. 23 (4): 649–680. doi:10.1086/491605. ISSN 0734-306X.
- Lazear, Edward P. (2006). "Speeding, Terrorism, and Teaching to the Test". The Quarterly Journal of Economics. 121 (3): 1029–1061. doi:10.1162/qjec.121.3.1029. ISSN 0033-5533.
- Lazear, Edward, P. (2008). "personnel economics," The New Palgrave Dictionary of Economics, 2nd Edition, v. 6, pp. 380–84]. Abstract.

Political offices
Preceded by Ben Bernanke	Chair of the Council of Economic Advisers; 2006–2009	Succeeded by Christina Romer
