= Dale W. Jorgenson =

American economist (1933–2022)

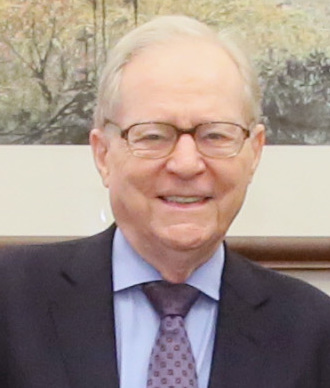
- Jorgenson in 2015
- Born: May 7, 1933; Bozeman, Montana, U.S.
- Died: June 8, 2022 (aged 89); Cambridge, Massachusetts, U.S.

Academic background
- Education: Harvard University (Ph.D., 1959); Reed College (B.A., 1955)
- Doctoral advisor: Wassily Leontief

Academic work
- Discipline: Economic theory Information technology Economic growth Energy and the environment Tax policy Investment behavior Applied econometrics
- Institutions: Harvard University
- Doctoral students: Robert Lucas Jr. M. Ishaq Nadiri Lawrence Lau; Ajit Singh; Fumio Hayashi; Charles Horioka; William Perraudin
- Awards: John Bates Clark Medal (1971)
- Website: Information at IDEAS / RePEc

Dale Weldeau Jorgenson (May 7, 1933 – June 8, 2022) was an American economist who served as the Samuel W. Morris University Professor at Harvard University. An influential econometric scholar, he was famed for his work on the relationship between productivity and economic growth, the economics of climate change, and the intersection between economics and statistics. Described as a "master" of his field, he received the John Bates Clark Medal in 1971, and was described as a worthy contender for the Nobel Memorial Prize in Economic Sciences.

== Life and career ==
Jorgenson was born in 1933 in Bozeman, Montana. He received a BA in economics from Reed College in 1955, an AM in economics from Harvard University in 1957, and a PhD in economics from Harvard in 1959. He became an assistant professor of economics at the University of California, Berkeley, in 1959, where he was appointed an associate professor in 1961, and a full professor in 1963. He returned to his alma mater, Harvard, in 1969, where he was appointed the Frederic Eaton Abbe Professor of Economics in 1980, and the Samuel W. Morris University Professor in 2002. Between 1962 and 1963, he served as the Ford Foundation Research Professor of Economics at the University of Chicago, and was the Frank William Taussig Research Professor of Economics at Harvard from 1992 to 1994. He taught as a visiting professor at several universities throughout his career, including Oxford, Stanford, and the Hebrew University of Jerusalem.

Jorgenson was elected a Fellow of the Econometric Society in 1964, a Fellow of the American Statistical Association the following year, and a Fellow of the American Academy of Arts and Sciences in 1969. He was elected to the National Academy of Sciences in 1978, and to the American Philosophical Society in 1998. He was elected a Foreign Member of the Royal Swedish Academy of Sciences in 1989, and was the recipient of nine honorary doctorates. He received the John Bates Clark Medal in 1971, and served as President of the American Economic Association in 2000.

Jorgenson was an advocate of a carbon tax on greenhouse gas emissions, as a means of reducing global warming; he testified to that end before Congress in 1997. His research has also been used to advocate for the FairTax, a proposal for tax reform in the United States which advocates replacing all federal payroll and income taxes (both corporate and personal) with a national sales tax and a monthly tax rebate to households of citizens and legal resident aliens. Jorgenson also designed a tax plan of his own, called the Efficient Taxation of Income, which he described in his book Investment, Vol. 3: Lifting the Burden: Tax Reform, the Cost of Capital, and U.S. Economic Growth. The approach would introduce different tax rates for property-type income and earned income from work.

== Research ==
Jorgenson's 1963 paper, “Capital Theory and Investment Behavior,” introduced the important features of the cost of capital employed in subsequent literature. His principal innovations were the derivation of investment demand from a model of capital as a factor of production, the incorporation of the tax treatment of income from capital into the price of capital input, and the econometric modelling of gestation lags in the investment process. In 1971, Jorgenson surveyed empirical research on investment in the Journal of Economic Literature. In the same year, he was awarded the John Bates Clark Medal for his research on investment behavior. In 2011 Jorgenson's paper was chosen as one of the 20 best papers published in the first 100 years of the American Economic Review.

=== Predominant role of investment ===
In 2005 Jorgenson traced the American growth resurgence to its sources in individual industries in his book, Information Technology and the American Growth Resurgence, co-authored with Mun S. Ho and Kevin J. Stiroh. This book employed the framework originated by Jorgenson, Frank M. Gollop, and Barbara M. Fraumeni, but added detailed information about investments in information technology equipment and software. Jorgenson and his co-authors demonstrated that input growth, due to investments in human and non-human capital, was the source of more than 80 percent of U.S. economic growth over the past half century, while growth in total factor productivity accounted for only 20 percent. Jorgenson and Khuong Vu (2005) established similar results for the world economy.

=== National accounts ===
Jorgenson and Steven Landefeld, director of the U.S. Bureau of Economic Analysis, have proposed a new system of national accounts that incorporates the cost of capital for all assets, including information technology equipment and software. The new system is presented in their book with William Nordhaus, published in 2006. In March 2007 Jorgenson's cost of capital was recommended by the United Nations Statistical Commission for incorporation into the United Nations’ 2008 System of National Accounts. Paul Schreyer (2009) has published an OECD Manual, Measuring Capital, to serve as a guide to practitioners. The “new architecture” was endorsed by the Advisory Committee on Measuring Innovation in the 21st Century to the Secretary of Commerce in 2008. Jorgenson (2009) has presented an updated version of the “new architecture” in his Richard and Nancy Ruggles Memorial Lecture to the International Association for Research in Income and Wealth.

The World KLEMS Initiative was established at Harvard University on August 19–20, 2010. This will ultimately include industry-level production accounts, incorporating capital (K), labor (L), energy (E), materials (M) and services (S) inputs, for more than forty countries. Accounts for 25 or the 27 EU members, assembled by 18 EU-based research teams, were completed on June 30, 2008, and are presented by Marcel P. Timmer, Robert Inklaar, Mary O’Mahony, and Bart van Ark (2010). This landmark study also provides industry-level accounts for Australia, Canada, Japan, and Korea, as well as the U.S., based on the methodology of Jorgenson, Ho, and Stiroh (2005). These industry-level production accounts are now included in the official national accounts for Australia, Canada, and five European countries. The World KLEMS initiative will extend these efforts to important emerging and transition economies, including Argentina, Brazil, Chile, China, India, Indonesia, Mexico, Russia, Turkey, and Taiwan.

=== Welfare measurement ===
In 1990 Jorgenson presented econometric methods for welfare measurement in his Presidential Address to the Econometric Society. These methods have generated a new approach to cost of living measurement and new measures of the standard of living, inequality, and poverty. This has required dispensing with ordinal measures of individual welfare that are not comparable among individuals, as persuasively argued by Amartya Sen in 1977. Jorgenson and Daniel T. Slesnick have met this requirement by substituting cardinal measures of individual welfare that are fully comparable among individuals. In 1989 Arthur Lewbel showed how the household equivalence scales proposed by Jorgenson and Slesnick can be used for this purpose.

=== Evaluation of alternative policies ===
In 1993 Jorgenson and Peter J. Wilcoxen surveyed this evaluation of energy, environmental, trade, and tax policies, based on the econometric general equilibrium models Jorgenson developed with Ho and Wilcoxen. The concept of an intertemporal price system provides the unifying framework. This system balances current demands and supplies for products and factors of production. Asset prices are linked to the present values of future capital services through rational expectations equilibrium. The long-run dynamics of economic growth are captured through linkages among capital services, capital stocks, and past investments. Alternative policies are compared in terms of the impact of changes in policy on individual and social welfare. This approach was incorporated into the official guidelines for preparing economic analyses by the U.S. Environmental Protection Agency in 2000.

=== Machine learning ===
While Dale W. Jorgenson was primarily a foundational econometrician and growth economist rather than a computer scientist, his empirical frameworks, data structures, and private industry advisory roles bridged traditional economic measurement with modern data-driven forecasting. His development of high-dimensional measurement frameworks, such as the KLEMS productivity architecture, provided the highly structured datasets utilized in contemporary computational economics. Furthermore, his pioneering work on flexible functional forms—most notably the translog production function—allowed for the approximation of complex, non-linear economic behaviors without rigid parametric constraints, conceptually aligning with the underlying philosophies of machine learning regressions.

== Personal life ==
Jorgenson was married to Linda Mabus Jorgenson, an attorney, with whom he had a son, Eric, and a daughter, Kari. He died on June 8, 2022, in Cambridge, Massachusetts. The cause was described as respiratory ailments.

== Notes ==
Academic offices
Preceded by D. Gale Johnson	President of the American Economic Association; 2000– 2001	Succeeded by Sherwin Rosen
