= Efficient Taxation of Income =

Taxation approach

The Efficient Taxation of Income is an approach to taxation that would apply different tax rates for property-type income and earned income from work. Earned income would be taxed at a flat rate of 10%, while property-type income would be taxed at 30%. The plan was created by Dale Jorgenson, Samuel W. Morris University Professor at Harvard University, and Kun-Young Yun, Professor of Economics at Yonsei University, Korea. Jorgenson states that the plan would provide big gains in economic efficiency that would result from making the tax treatment of income from corporate, non-corporate and household property the same. The plan has been discussed before the United States Congress but a bill has not been introduced.

Under Efficient Taxation of Income, each dollar of new business investment would generate a credit against taxes on business income. The rates for these credits would make tax burdens on all income sources the same. Taxes on new investments by households would be collected by car dealers, real estate developers, and other providers. These would not apply to existing home owners and would protect property values. Jorgenson states that the Efficient Taxation of Income could be implemented without cumbersome transition rules. In the United States, the tax treatment of Social Security and Medicare contributions and benefits would be unaffected, as would the treatment of private pension plans. Jorgenson estimates that the total one-off gain from Efficient Taxation of Income in the U.S. would be $4,900 billion, while adoption of the Flat Tax would yield only $2,060 billion. The gains underscore the benefits of shifting investment to higher-yielding assets and reflect greater investment and faster economic growth.

== See also ==
- Income tax in the United States
- Taxation in the United States
