= Tournament theory =

Theory in economics used to describe reasons for wage differences

Tournament theory is the theory in personnel economics used to describe certain situations where wage differences are based not on marginal productivity but instead upon relative differences between the individuals. This theory was invented by economists Edward Lazear and Sherwin Rosen.

The theory has been applied to professional sports and to the practice of law. Tournament theory also was applied to writing - one writer may be fractionally better at writing than another (and therefore have a better book), but because people allocate small amounts of time to reading, the writer with the marginally better book will sell far more copies.

== "Rank-Order Tournaments as Optimum Labor Contracts" ==
Lazear and Rosen proposed tournament theory in their 1981 paper Rank-Order Tournaments as Optimum Labor Contracts, looking at performance related pay. Under conventional systems workers are paid a piece rate - an amount of money that relates to their output, rather than the time they input. Tournament theory suggests that workers can be rewarded by their rank in an organization, suggesting why large salaries are given to senior executives: to provide a 'prize' to those who put in enough effort to garner one of the top positions.

The paper invites the reader to consider the lifetime output of a worker at a firm. This output is dictated by two things - chance and skill. The worker can control his lifetime output by investing in skills early on in life, like studying hard at school and getting good qualifications, but a part of that output will be determined by chance. Participants in the tournament commit their investment early on in life and are unlikely to know each other previously, within the firm they work in, and may not even know each other within the firm. This prevents collusion or cheating in the tournament.

Looking at the tournament in its simplest form, a two player tournament, where there is a prize for the winner and a smaller consolation for the loser. The incentive to win increases as the difference between the losing and winning prize increases, and therefore the investment of the worker is increased as the difference between the winning and losing prizes is increased. It is in the interest of the firm to increase the spread of prizes. However, there is a balance for the firms to consider: workers become more expensive as their effort increases. Competing firms could offer a tournament with a lower spread and attract more workers because they would have to invest less. Therefore, there is an optimal prize spread that firms set, high enough to induce investment but low enough so that the investment is not too expensive for the worker. The prize may take the form of extra cash or a promotion - which means more money, as well as entering a higher level of tournament, where the stakes may be higher.

The idea that the prize may be in the form of a promotion explains why presidents are paid significantly more than vice presidents. In one day a Vice-President may be promoted to President of a company and have his pay tripled. Considering piece rates this seems illogical - his output is unlikely to have tripled in one day. But looking at it using tournament theory it seems logical - he has won the tournament and received his prize - presidency.

Tournament theory is an efficient way of labour compensation when quantifying output is difficult or expensive, but ranking workers is easy. It is also effective as it provides goals for workers and incentivises hard work so that they may one day attain one of the coveted positions at the top. An advantage to workers over a piece rate would be that in the event of a natural disaster they would preserve their wage as their output would go down in absolute terms but stay the same relative to their colleagues. This means that in times of disaster workers could maintain their wage.

Benefits of tournament (+) Motivates workers (+) Offers stability during volatile market conditions (reduce shocks) (+) Selecting workers (observe) (+) Reduce variability in pay (commit & credible) (+) Encourage Long-run behaviour to stay

== Foundational principles ==
There are two foundational predictions of tournament theory. These predictions can be illustrated by examining a simple two-player contest with identical risk-neutral actors. Let performance (output) be measured by $q$:

$q=u+e.$

Here, $u$ represents the effort or investment by a player, while $e$ is a random component (e.g. luck or noise). Players are rewarded for performance with one of two prizes, $W_1$ or $W_2$, where $W_1>W_2$. $W_1$ goes to the player with better performance, while $W_2$ goes to the player with worse performance. Each player's actions have a cost associated, denoted by $C(u)$. The probability that player $a$ wins $W_1$ is positively related to that player's action $u_a$ and negatively related to the opponent player's action $u_b$, as well as the random component $e$. If $P$ is the probability of winning, then the contestant can receive the following payoff:

$P[W_1-C(u_i)]+(1-P)[W_2-C(u_i)]=P(W_1-W_2)+W_2-C(u_i).$

When player $a$ chooses $u_i$ to maximise his/her payoff, then:

$\frac{\partial P}{\partial u_i}(W_1-W_2)-C'(u_i).=0$

In a two-player tournament the Nash equilibrium occurs when both players maximise their payoff while assuming the other player's effort is fixed. At this equilibrium the marginal cost of effort $C'$ is equal to the marginal value of effort $V$, such that:

$\frac{\partial P}{\partial u_i}(W_1-W_2)=V.$

From this equation, two principles can be derived. The first is that an actor's level of effort increases with the spread between the winning and losing prize. The second is that only the difference between the winning and the losing prize matters to the two contestants, not the absolute size of their winnings. These two testable predictions of tournament theory have been supported by empirical research over the years, especially in the fields of labour economics and sports.

== Pros and cons of workplace tournaments ==
=== Incentivizing performance ===
Tournaments can be very powerful at incentivising performance. Empirical research in economics and managements have shown that tournament-like incentive structure increases the individual performance or workers and managers in the workplace. The distribution of effort for one tournament experiment found that almost 80% of participants exert higher than anticipated levels of efforts, thus suggesting that tournaments provides strong competition incentives. Tournaments also provide powerful non-monetary incentives. Studies show that participants in tournaments value winning itself and placing highly on relative rankings. One experiment found that more than 40% of individuals were willing to exert positive effort with a monetary incentive of $0.

=== Matching workers and jobs ===
Tournaments play an important function in matching workers with jobs that are relevant/appropriate. The theoretical prediction in the literature is that higher-skilled individuals would be sorted into jobs that offer higher potential returns. This is well-supported by empirical data. For instance, in the field of competitive running more accomplished competitors with greater capabilities are more likely to choose tournaments with greater prize spreads.

=== Inequalities in the workplace ===
Tournaments have the potential to create large inequalities in payoffs. Incentive based tournaments are organised in such a way that some winners are created at the expense of many losers. Thus, by design there are likely to be high inequalities in payoffs in the workplace under a tournament structure. A further potential inequality is gender inequality in the workplace. Field studies have shown that women are less likely to enter tournaments than men and also do not perform as well. Thus, even in cases where women may be more capable or better skilled, tournament-like incentives may discourage women from participating.

=== Selfish and unethical behaviour ===
A major issue with tournaments is that individuals are incentivised to view others as competitors, thus encouraging selfish behaviour. This means that participants in a tournament structured workplace would be less likely to help each other and are discouraged from knowledge sharing more so than in other incentive schemes. Through such increased opportunistic and selfish behavior, firms with tournament structures and large inequalities in payoffs may harm their customer relationships. Further, tournaments may also encourage unethical behaviour in participants such as cheating or collusion in competitive sports or plagiarism in the academic field.

== See also ==
- Winner-take-all market
- Superstars
- Long tail
- Free-rider problem
