= Vacancy chain =

Social structure

A vacancy chain is a social structure through which resources are distributed to consumers. In a vacancy chain, a new resource unit that arrives into a population is taken by the first individual in line, who then leaves their old unit behind, this old unit is taken by a second individual, leaving their old unit behind, and so forth.

== Process ==
Vacancy chains are started when an initial vacancy enters a population, such as when a new house is built, a new car is manufactured, or a new job is created. It can also begin when an existing unit is vacated by someone leaving the system under consideration, such as an employee retiring, or a home owner goes to a nursing home.

Eventually a chain will come to an end, usually with a new entrant into the system or when the last unit in a chain is abandoned, merged, or destroyed. This can involve a new employee recruit or a housing unit on the market for the first time, or when a house in the chain is torn down, left empty, or the duties of a vacant job are distributed among other employees. A vacancy chain is simply the sequence of moves that a vacancy makes from initial entry into a system to final termination. The distribution of material resources and social positions through vacancy chain processes requires that the things distributed possess a number of abstract qualities. These qualities include that the resource units in question are reusable, discrete, identifiable, and utilized by one individual or social group at a time.

Further, in vacancy chain mobility systems, a unit must be vacant before it can be taken by a new occupant; individuals must need or want new and usually bigger or better units from time to time; vacant units must be scarce (the number is small compared to the number of individuals who want them); and most individuals in a group already must have units so they can leave one behind when they move to a new one.

In order to trace a vacancy chain, a researcher notes a vacancy coming into a system and then follows this vacancy as it moves to a number of resource units in turn and then finally leaves the system. Since vacancy chains in humans often take considerable periods of time, on the order of months, to move from beginning to end and because the chains often involve people widely scattered geographically, researchers usually trace the chains by reconstructing them from organizational records or from series of linked interviews.

The length of a vacancy chain is the number of moves a vacancy makes after its entrance into a system, and this includes the terminal move to the absorbing state. Longer chains and more costly resource units generate greater benefits, while shorter chains and less costly units generate smaller benefits, for the individuals and institutions involved. Vacancy chains have patterned effects upon other individuals and, in the human case, institutions connected to the primary individuals actually getting resources in the chains.

== Effects ==
Usually when a vacancy occurs the bulk of the people who fill the position(s) come from inside the internal labor market rather than hiring someone new. The individuals being moved and or promoted to a new job/position often gain a higher salary or more benefits which has an important impact on the organization. Individuals affected by vacancy chains starting in an organization usually are upwardly mobile in small to moderate jumps in status or laterally mobile within their same status; they rarely experience downward mobility. In systems in which they operate, vacancy chains have a strong influence upon organizational demographics. Such factors as length of service distributions for individuals within the organization, rates of advancement within the system, the age distribution of individuals within particular strata, cohort effects for mobility within the system, and waiting times for advancement. Several researchers have used vacancy chain studies to investigate equal opportunity of access by different groups to mobility opportunities.

The number and initial strata of the vacancy chains created influence the career possibilities of the individuals in the internal labor market and those about to enter. The more chains initiated at higher levels, the more mobility opportunities for individuals throughout the system, as the chains move downward, and the greater the speed with which individuals advance to high status or large units and positions. On the other hand, if chains are mostly initiated at lower levels, individuals already in high status positions will see their careers plateau while only those at lower levels will move comparatively quickly before they reach a career bottleneck caused by the lack of opportunities at higher levels.

== In other species ==
Synchronous and asynchronous vacancy chains have been found to occur amongst both terrestrial and marine populations of hermit crabs. The crabs live in shells left behind by other species but need to move into a new, larger, shell as they grow. When a vacant shell becomes available, the crabs may slowly form a chain, ranging from the largest to the smallest crab until one arrives that is just the right size for the shell. Once the "Goldilocks" crab claims the new shell leaving its old shell vacant, the crabs then all rapidly exchange shells, in sequence, until they all have a larger shell, allowing them to grow without restriction. This behavior makes hermit crabs an ideal animal model for testing predictions of vacancy chain theory. Similar shelter-based vacancy chains are likely to take place in many animal groups that use discrete, reusable resources that are limited to occupancy by a single individual or group at a time; some other examples include anemone-dwelling clownfish, and cavity-nesting birds.

== See also ==
- Markov chains
- Structural functionalism

== Sources ==
- Harrison Colyar White, Chains of Opportunity. System Models of Mobility in Organizations, Harvard University Press, 1970
