= Jennifer Roback Morse =

American journalist

Jennifer Roback Morse (born 1953) is an economist, a writer and a Catholic social conservative. She is the president and founder of the Ruth Institute, which was formed as an affiliate of the same-sex marriage opposition group National Organization for Marriage.

== Early life and education ==
Jennifer Anne Roback was born November 12, 1953, in Columbus, Ohio, where she was raised in the Catholic faith. She attended Oberlin College and completed her baccalaureate degree at Ohio State University, discovering "the free-market thinking that would form the initial basis of her professional life". As a graduate student at the University of Rochester, she became attracted to libertarianism. She earned her doctorate in 1980, with a dissertation entitled The value of local urban amenities: theory and measurement.. Working with Sherwin Rosen, she created the Roback-Rosen model in urban economics.

In the 1970s she had an abortion and divorced her first husband. She regretted her abortion, and returned to the Catholic faith of her youth. Because they had been unable to have children, she and her second husband adopted a two-year-old boy from Romania in April 1991; she gave birth to a daughter in October 1991.

== Career ==
My understanding of the human person and society had been deeply influenced by free-market economics and libertarian political theory, which have shaped my entire adult working life. As I came to realize how much I had overlooked, I concluded that my profession was overlooking much as well. It had forgotten about the vulnerability of children and the need for families: Without loving families, no society can long govern itself.

— Jennifer Roback Morse

In 1985, George Mason University economics professor James M. Buchanan recruited Morse to teach there. She became tenured faculty, "teaching courses on microeconomics and researching the economic history of the Civil War". Her husband did not like the Washington, D.C., area, though, and they moved to Silicon Valley in California, and later to San Diego. She published Love & Economics in 2001.

Morse has worked as a part-time research fellow at the Acton Institute for the Study of Religion and Liberty, taught at Yale, and also served as a research fellow at Stanford University's Hoover Institution.

Morse founded the Ruth Institute in 2008 in San Marcos, California. The Ruth Institute was an arm of the National Organization for Marriage (NOM), which opposed the legalization of same-sex marriage. Morse became "an official spokesman for Proposition 8", a 2008 California ballot measure which amended the California Constitution with the sentence, "Only marriage between a man and a woman is valid or recognized in California." (The initiative passed, but was overturned in federal court rulings.) By November 1, 2013, the Ruth Institute was independent of NOM.

In 2013, the Ruth Institute was designated as an anti-LGBT hate group by the Southern Poverty Law Center. Morse has responded to this designation, saying "If fighting sex abuse, pornography, and divorce makes us a hate group, so be it." Following publication of the Department of Justice Guidelines to Ensure the Civil Rights of Transgender Students in 2016, Morse responded with objections that the guidelines are "far-reaching" and "of questionable legality". In 2017, Vanco (Global Cloud Xchange) stopped processing online payments for the Institute stating, "The organization has been flagged by Card Brands as being affiliated with a product/service that promotes hate, violence, harassment and/or abuse."

Our Sunday Visitor named Morse one of nine 2013 Catholic Stars, leaders who "have renewed, encouraged and inspired in the Faith".

Morse signed the 2017 Nashville Statement, affirming a complementarian view of gender.

In 2019, Morse hired controversial anti-gay marriage activist and artist Mary Summerhays as the Ruth Institute's "art director". Summherhays had previously been accused of exploiting the children of gay parents by using unauthorized photos of families in her work. As of 2025, Summerhays is no longer listed as a member of the institute.

== Selected publications ==
In 2005, Morse published Smart Sex: Finding Life-long Love in a Hook-up World (Spence Publishing Company, 260 pages, ISBN 9781890626587), which detailed her beliefs in favor of heterosexual marriage. Her other publications include:

- Morse, J. (2018). The Sexual State: How Elite Ideologies are Destroying Lives and Why the Church Was Right All Along. TAN Books. ISBN 978-1505112450.
- Morse, J. (2003). "Making Room at the Inn: Why the Modern World Needs the Needy." Wealth, Poverty, and Human Destiny. Wilmington, DE: ISI Books. ISBN 9781882926831
- Morse, J. R. (2002). "Competing Visions of the Child, the Family, and the School". In Lazear, EP (ed.), Education in the Twenty-first Century. Stanford, CA: Hoover Institution. ERIC Number: ED467042
- Morse, J. R. (2001). Love & Economics Why the Laissez-Faire Family Doesn't Work. Dallas : Spence Pub. Co., 2001. 273 p. ISBN 9781890626297
- Morse, J. R. (1996). Putting the Self Into Self-Interest: An Economist Looks at Values. Heritage Foundation. The Heritage Lectures, no. 575.
- Morse, J.R. (1982) "Wages, Rents, and the Quality of Life", Journal of Political Economy.
