= Personnel economics =

Economics of labour within companies

Personnel economics has been defined as "the application of economic and mathematical approaches and econometric and statistical methods to traditional questions in human resources management". It is an area of applied micro labor economics, but there are a few key distinctions. One distinction, not always clearcut, is that studies in personnel economics deal with the personnel management within firms, and thus internal labor markets, while those in labor economics deal with labor markets as such, whether external or internal. In addition, personnel economics deals with issues related to both managerial-supervisory and non-supervisory workers.

The subject has been described as significant and different from sociological and psychological approaches to the study of organizational behavior and human resource management in various ways. It analyzes labor use, which accounts for the largest part of production costs for most firms, by formulation of relatively simple but generalizable and testable relationships. It also situates analysis in the context of market equilibrium, rational maximizing behavior, and economic efficiency, which may be used for prescriptive purposes as to improving performance of the firm. For example, an alternate compensation package that provided a risk-free benefit might elicit more work effort, consistent with psychologically-oriented prospect theory. But a personnel-economics analysis in its efficiency aspect would evaluate the package as to cost–benefit analysis, rather than work-effort benefits alone.

Personnel economics has its own Journal of Economic Literature classification code, JEL: M5 but overlaps with such labor economics subcategories as JEL: J2, J3, J4, and J5. Subjects treated (with footnoted examples below) include:

- firm employment decisions and promotions, including hiring, firing, turnover, part-time and temporary workers, and seniority issues related to promotions
- compensation and compensation methods and their effects, including stock options, fringe benefits, incentives, family support programs, and seniority issues related to compensation
- training, especially within the firm
- labor management, including team formation, worker empowerment, job design, tasks and authority, work arrangements, and job satisfaction
- labor contracting devices, including outsourcing, franchising, and other options.

== History of Personnel Economics ==
The field can be traced back to 1776 when Adam Smith, a British economist, suggested that within the labor market equilibrium, a trade-off between a worker's wages and non-monetary working conditions could exist. However, Personnel Economics did not gain prominence until 1987, when the Journal of Labor Economics published 10 articles on the field. During the 1990s, Personnel Economics gradually became more empirical-based, whereas previously the field was more heavily theoretical. Personnel Economics is now considered a branch of Labor Economics. In 1998, Edward Lazear described it as "the use of economics to understand the internal workings of the firm." With the availability of new data, the field has evolved to have more practical use. Econometric techniques have played a significant role in the field's development, with data being used to analyze personnel records and other human resource data. This is known as Insider Econometrics.

== Theory, Testing, and Possible Uses ==
Personnel economics began to emerge as a distinct field from a flurry of research in the 1970s that sought to answer the questions of how prices of goods and services traded within a firm are determined. An early difficulty that the subject addressed is possible differences between the interests of an employer considered as wanting cost-free output and employees as wanting cost-free income. The relationship is represented at a general level in the principal-agent problem whose solution is the firm modeled as a set of contracts for efficiently allocating risk and monitoring the performance of the production team and its members. Many questions about wage determination and the relationship between wages and productivity in a firm or government enterprise were raised as a result. The subject was developed in addressing those questions, including examination of pay structure and promotions within hierarchical organizations.

Major theories of the subject developed in the late 1970s and 1980s from the research of Bengt Holmström, Edward Lazear, and Sherwin Rosen to name but a few. Research threads included analysis of:

- Compensation according to piece rate, that is contributions to output, both when output is easily measured or when only the worker knows the difficulty of the job and his own contribution,
- efficiency-improving contracts as constrained by noise in production contributions, moral hazard, and distribution of risk aversion,
- compensation based on principles of tournament theory as a possibly more efficient substitute for piece-rate compensation.

From the later 1980s, researchers began to forge closer links with experimental economics, including generation of data to test the theories in the field. Other empirical studies conducted then utilized data from sports (e.g. golf tournaments and horse racing). and company records on their suppliers' performances (e.g. raising broiler chickens).

From the 1990s, there was a further surge of empirical tests of the theory from wider availability of personnel records of large companies to researchers and interest in the relation between compensation and productivity and the implications of imperfect labor markets and rent-seeking behavior for the subject.

A retrospective collection of the personnel economics-literature is in Lazear et al., ed. (2004), Personnel Economics, Elgar, with 43 articles dating from 1962 to 2000 (link to contents link here).

Two millennial articles by a contributor to the subject argued in the course of review and assessment to the conclusions that:

Because of the relevance and newly found rigor of personnel analysis, personnel economics should and will become a more important part of the educational curriculum. The field is growing and has a large potential audience, of both students and practitioners.

=== Gift Exchange Theory ===
The Gift Exchange Theory, also referred to as the fair-wage theory, applies when employees are provided with better wages than they could receive at another firm in exchange for a higher work standard.

In 1993, a laboratory experiment was conducted to test the effects that the Gift Exchange Theory had on employee effectiveness. Contrary to predictions, it was found that most employers were offering higher (sometimes by more than 100%) than market clearing wages. On average, the higher wage was requited by a higher output, often making it very profitable for employers to offer high wage contracts. Paying for an employee's performance can lead to increased productivity and higher competition surrounding highly skilled workers who will want to work for employers who pay for performance.

=== Tournament Theory ===
Tournament Theory was proposed by Edward Lazear and Sherwin Rosen. The theory addresses how pay raises are associated with promotions. The theory’s main point is that promotions are a relative gain. Regarding compensation, the level of compensation must be strong enough to motivate all employees below the level of compensation who aim to be promoted. If the pay spread between promotions is larger, the incentive of employees to put in effort will also be larger. The desired outcome from this would be to see employees performing at a quality and producing a quantity of output that the organization deems desirable. Compensation is also not necessarily determined by the conception of productivity. Employees are promoted based on their relative position within the organization and not by their productivity. However, productivity does hold some weight when considering promotion.

Advantages of Tournament Theory:

- Incentive Performance: Workplaces that promote competition among employees may benefit from incentivized performance. Studies have shown that competition within the workplace helps boost performance because employees value the idea of being better than the rest.
- Matching Workers and Jobs: Under Tournament Theory, workers are matched to their appropriate job. Firms with a tournament structure in the workplace are more likely to hire more competitive and highly-skilled workers, and firms with a workplace based structured around equity are more likely to hire less competitive and lower-skilled workers.

Disadvantages of Team Production:

- Inequality within the Workplace: Workplaces that are based around a tournament structure are prone to creating an unequal working environment. If workers are paid based on their performance, it has the potential to leave some employees worse off than others. This type environment could also be more demotivating for under-performing workers and more motivating for over-achieving workers which results in a bigger payoff gap between the two types of workers over time.
- Unethical Behavior: A problem with competition in a workplace is that it is prone to promoting unethical behavior within employees. As they are competing against each other, they may succumb to inappropriate actions that can hurt another employee's standing within the company. For example, employees may sabotage each other or take credit for others' work.

=== Principal-Agent Problem ===
The Principal-Agent Problem is based on the relationship between an employer (principal) and an employee (agent). In this case, the employer relies on their employees to maximize the firm’s utility. In practice, incentives are sometimes misaligned between the principal and the agent. This occurs due to differing goals between the two, this can lead to adverse selection for the principal when hiring an agent, they cannot fully evaluate an agent's skills and moral hazard for the agent when presented with more information than the principal.

==== Approaches to Resolving Conflict ====
1. Fixed payment with monitoring
  - Fixed salaries are provided to agents while their performance is under observation. Fixed payment with monitoring is an approach where fixed salaries are given to agents while their performance is being observed. The advantage of this approach is that it reduces the risk of shirking by the agent as their work is being monitored.
  - Disadvantages: Shirking, monitoring costs and adverse selection. However, it also has some disadvantages, such as monitoring costs, adverse selection, and the possibility of an inequitable pay system. The cost of monitoring the agent's work can be expensive, and this may not be feasible for some firms. Additionally, adverse selection may occur as agents may choose to work in firms where their performance is not as heavily monitored. In terms of inequitable pay, fixed payment with monitoring may not always be reasonable as it does not take into account delays or interruptions that may be outside of the agent's control.
2. Incentive pay without monitoring
  - Payment is correlated with output and performance is not monitored. Incentive pay without monitoring is an approach where payment is correlated with output, and performance is not monitored. This approach allows for greater flexibility, but it also has some disadvantages, such as shirking and inequitable pay. As the agent's pay is directly correlated with their output, there is a greater incentive for the agent to perform well.
  - Disadvantages: Inequitable pay and compensation. However, without monitoring, there is a risk of shirking, where the agent may not act in the best interest of the principal/firm. Additionally, an inequitable pay system may arise if delays or interruptions occur, and the agent is still expected to produce the same amount of output.

Shirking: If agents are guaranteed pay, they may lack the motivation to act in the best interest of the principal/firm. This can lead to the agent not performing at the expected level or engaging in behavior that is not aligned with the principal's goals.

Monitoring Costs: Monitoring and measuring agent performance can be costly for the principal, as it requires additional resources and time. The costs associated with monitoring can also be a disincentive for the principal to invest in monitoring, leading to a lack of oversight and potential issues with agent behavior.

Adverse Selection: If the principal heavily monitors and controls agent behavior, highly skilled agents may choose to work elsewhere where their skills are better appreciated and they have more autonomy. This can result in the principal being left with lower quality agents who are willing to work under these conditions.

Inequitable Pay: Fixed payment with monitoring can be prone to delays and interruptions, making it unreasonable to punish agents for issues outside of their control. This can lead to inequitable pay and compensation for agents who are performing well but face delays or interruptions. Additionally, incentive pay without monitoring can lead to inequitable pay if the correlation between output and pay is not properly calibrated.

Compensation: Compensation is an approach where the principal may have to provide agents with a risk premium as they bear a risk with payment. This approach acknowledges that agents take on some risk in their work and may need to be compensated accordingly. However, this approach may not always be feasible as it may increase the costs for the principal/firm.

=== Team Production ===
In modern times, firms have increasingly adopted team production instead of pursuing individual production. Team production is a form of production where a group of individuals with complementary skills work together to produce a final product. This approach offers several advantages and disadvantages.

Advantages of Team Production:

One of the key advantages of team production is that it can be more productive than individual production. Work can be distributed between employees based on each of their specific skill sets, which makes the overall process more efficient. Many projects require a wide variety of skill sets, and it is unlikely that one individual will have all the required skills to complete the project by themselves. By working in a team, members with complementary skill sets can benefit from each other, allowing for more efficiency in the project.

Teamwork offers different perspectives, and each member may have a different way of handling the project. By sharing ideas, teams can produce better quality work than if the project was done by an individual. Furthermore, it is easier for firms to hire people with less skill, each specialising in a few skills than hiring an individual with a wide variety of skills. This approach is more cost-effective as individuals with a high skill set are more expensive to hire.

Disadvantages of Team Production:

Despite the benefits, team production has its disadvantages. The time it takes to organise teams and have them cooperate can be time-consuming. Additionally, there is a potential risk of having a free-rider problem, where individuals within a team can get away with no contribution to the work and still be compensated the same amount as their peers.

However, free-riding can be eliminated by organising set protocols. This allows for easier communication and decision-making, giving each member of the team responsibilities and requirements that are agreed upon. Punishing free-riders is another way to deter them from repeating the offence.

In conclusion, even though free-riding is an issue when working as a team, the benefits may outweigh the potential disadvantages. Team production is suitable for many projects that require a variety of skill sets, and it enables firms to produce high-quality work while remaining cost-effective. Additionally, teamwork offers a chance for individuals to learn from each other and develop new skills, leading to better job satisfaction and morale.

=== Pay Compression ===
Pay Compression refers to a situation where wage or salary levels are indistinguishable between long-term employees and newly hired employees, and this issue develops over time. If left unresolved, organisations run the risk of turnover as long-term employees may feel undervalued and start looking for work elsewhere. However, a certain degree of pay compression may lead to an efficient market outcome.

Organisations with a team-based work environment may consider a certain degree of pay compression. This would make equity more relevant in close comparisons, boost morale and worker efficiency, and provide insurance to employees during uncertain outcomes, such as bad market conditions. However, pay compression leaves employees vulnerable to moral hazard problems, and they may put less effort into their work.

According to the Tournament Theory, employees may improve their image not only by making themselves look better but also by making their rivals look worse. Pay being based on relative performance may cause some issues within the workplace, as co-workers will be less likely to cooperate with each other if there is an opportunity to outshine each other. Pay compression can help in this case by closing the salary gap between job levels, which in turn gives less incentive for employees to sabotage their co-workers.

Pay compression is not a one-size-fits-all solution, and organisations must carefully consider the potential benefits and drawbacks before implementing it. In some cases, pay compression may lead to turnover or reduced effort, while in others, it may lead to increased morale and productivity. By analysing their specific situation and goals, organisations can determine whether pay compression is a viable solution for their compensation issues.

=== Hedonic Model of Compensation ===
The Hedonic Model of Compensation is a method used to estimate the value of compensation for a worker beyond just their wage or salary. This model is based on the revealed preference theory, which states that individuals reveal their preferences through their choices. Employees value aspects such as flexible work hours, a comfortable working environment, health insurance and pension benefits, and recognition and mentoring from bosses, in addition to monetary compensation.

The Hedonic Model helps firms to strike a balance between costs and benefits, with the goal of offering the best mixed package of pay and benefits to entice workers. The final package is determined by the preferences of the employees, the cost structure of the firm, and the firm's desire to hire employees.

The model also predicts that there is a negative trade-off between wages and "positive" job attributes, such as a desirable work location or enjoyable working environment. Each firm offers the benefits that attract its most valued type of worker, and while these benefits are costly for the firm, they can also boost productivity.

Older workers tend to favour health insurance or pension benefits more than younger workers, and the Hedonic Model can help firms to design compensation packages that cater to the preferences of different employee segments. By understanding what employees value beyond just their wage or salary, firms can create more tailored and attractive compensation packages that help to attract and retain high-quality talent.

=== Human Resource Practices in Personnel Economics ===
Human Resource Practices in Personnel Economics refer to the methods and techniques that firms use to manage their workforce. Over time, the HR practices have evolved to focus more on teamwork and incentive pay. However, not all firms have been successful in implementing these changes. The success of a new practice depends on its complementarity with other practices. Firms run the risk of not reaching optimal output if they choose to adopt only one or two practices.

Complementary practices refer to a set of HR practices that work in tandem with each other to produce better results. For instance, a firm that adopts a system of teamwork, incentive pay, and training is likely to perform better than a firm that only adopts one or two of these practices. Economists and non-economists alike acknowledge the importance of complementary practices in HR management.

Studies have shown that firms that adopt a complementary set of practices are more productive than those that adopt a limited set. For example, a study conducted by Ichniowski, Shaw, and Prennushi in 1997 found that steel mills that used a complementary set of practices were substantially more productive than those that used a limited set.

In conclusion, the success of HR practices depends on their complementarity with other practices. Firms that adopt a complementary set of practices are likely to be more productive than those that adopt only one or two practices. This emphasises the need for firms to consider a set of practices over an individual practice when implementing new HR practices.

==== Motivation-enhancing HR practices ====
In human resource management, organisations use two types of practices: skill-enhancing practices and motivation-enhancing practices. Motivation-enhancing practices are designed to motivate and engage employees in order to improve their performance and productivity.

The following are some motivation-enhancing practices that organisations commonly use:

- Performance pay vs. fixed pay
  - Performance Pay: Pay based on the performance of the worker. This is a type of compensation that is based on the performance of the worker. Employees receive pay based on how well they perform their duties and responsibilities.
  - Fixed Pay: Pay that is fixed for all workers. This is a type of compensation where the pay is fixed for all workers, regardless of their performance.
- Close supervision vs. freedom and trust
  - Close Supervision: Work is monitored and closely reviewed. This is where work is closely monitored and reviewed by managers or supervisors.
  - Freedom and Trust: Workers are less monitored and have more freedom. This is where workers are given more freedom to work on their own and are trusted to complete their tasks without close supervision.
- Reward seniority vs. reward (comparative) performance
  - Reward Seniority: Benefits for staying with a company in the long-term.This is where benefits are given to employees who have been with the company for a long time. The longer they have worked for the company, the more benefits they receive.
  - Reward Performance: Rewarded on the basis of performance, rather than seniority. This is where employees are rewarded based on their performance and achievements, rather than their seniority.
- Job security (tenure) vs. competitive selection
  - Job Security: Insured a secure long-term job regardless of performance. This is where employees are guaranteed job security regardless of their performance.
  - Competitive Selection: Workers compete for jobs, under-performing workers are likely to be let go and over-achieving workers stay. This is where workers compete for jobs and those who underperform are likely to be let go, while those who overachieve stay.
- Intrinsic motivation vs. extrinsic rewards
  - Intrinsic Motivation: Appreciation of the work employees produce, motivation to work harder.This is where employees are motivated by their own interest and enjoyment in their work, rather than by external rewards.
  - Extrinsic Rewards: Monetary rewards for producing high quality work. This is where employees are motivated by external rewards, such as bonuses or promotions.
- Benefits and entitlements vs. additional pay
  - Benefits and Entitlements: Compensation in the form of non-monetary payment, e.g., insurance, pension, etc. This is where compensation is given to employees in the form of non-monetary payment, such as insurance or pension plans.
  - Additional Pay: Compensation in the form of monetary payment. This is where compensation is given to employees in the form of monetary payment, such as bonuses or pay raises.

==== Skill-enhancing HR practices ====
Skill-enhancing HR practices refer to policies, practices, and procedures used to enhance the knowledge, skills, and competencies of employees. Organisations use skill-enhancing practices to increase the productivity and effectiveness of their employees. Here are some examples of skill-enhancing HR practices:

- Staff development programs vs. Peer training
  - Staff development programs: Staff development programs refer to policies and practices used to develop the knowledge, skills, and competencies of staff. These programs can be in the form of workshops, seminars, and training sessions.
  - Peer training: Peer training is a process of enhancing skills through interactions with peers. Peer training can be formal or informal, and it involves learning from colleagues who have the desired skills.
- Hiring for talent vs. Hiring for experience
  - Hiring for talent: When hiring new employees, organisations can either focus on talent or experience. Hiring for talent involves selecting new employees based on their innate ability, interest, and motivation towards a particular type of work.
  - Hiring for experience: Hiring for experience involves selecting new employees based on their previous experience in a similar position.
- Promoting diversity vs. Focusing on 'merit'
  - Promoting diversity: Organisations can choose to promote diversity or focus on merit when hiring new employees. Promoting diversity involves expanding the scope of the company in terms of individual differences such as race, gender, age, religion, and nationality.
  - Focus on merit: Focusing on merit involves selecting individuals who are most deserving based on their performance.

== See also ==
- Efficiency wage
- Human capital
- Internal labor market
