= Kate Shaw (Australian academic) =

Australian academic and planning activist

Kate Shaw (born 1961, in Melbourne, Australia) is an Australian academic, planning activist and commentator. As of 2026, she was a honorary research fellow in Urban Geography and Planning at the University of Melbourne.

== Background ==
Shaw's background is in alternative cultures. She worked in alternative theatre and arts publicity in Melbourne in the 1980s, before pursuing a postgraduate diploma in urban policy and planning (1993) and a master's in social science (2000), both at RMIT. She then moved to the University of Melbourne and taught planning law, statutory planning, urban design, and ran classes on political economy, gentrification and the cultures of cities.

Shaw's PhD in planning (University of Melbourne, 2005) was "Room to move: the politics of protecting the place of alternative culture" and used a number of case studies from European and Australian cities to investigate the range of policies that have been used to support alternative culture in neighbourhoods subject to gentrification.

From 2005 to 2008 she was research associate on a large project with Prof. Ruth Fincher titled "Transnational and Temporary: students, community and place-making in central Melbourne", looking at the growing student population and how they are housed in Melbourne. Her own ARC funded project on "Planning the 'creative city': reconciling global strategies with local subcultures" took place from 2009 to 2012.

== Scholarly contributions ==
Shaw's current research focuses on urban renewal in the 21st century. Accepting that the economic case for growth combines with the environmental case for limiting urban sprawl to produce an irresistible logic for increasing the densities of Australian cities, it explores ways of improving on the renewal projects of the last 50 years. Current work examines the legislative, regulatory, financial, political and cultural barriers to socially equitable urban development, and researches practices across the world that do it well. Shaw has focused on public housing renewal programs for more than a decade.

In 2009, Shaw was the co-author of Whose Urban Renaissance? An international comparison of urban regeneration policies.

She has written extensively on the subject of gentrification.

As of July 2026, she was completing a book titled The Squander and Salvage of Global Urban Waterfronts.

== Public engagement ==
Shaw is notable for her work in connection with the protection of local cultural diversity and alternative sub-cultures.

As well as academic publications, she publishes opinion articles in the media, makes inquiry submissions, participates in radio interviews and writes for The Conversation.

Shaw was involved in the 'Save the Espy' campaign (1997–2003), formally known as The Esplanade Alliance, which was a campaign to retain the Esplanade Hotel, Melbourne. When the Esplanade Alliance planned to present a history of the hotel's culture to the developer, they were locked out of the hotel, and Shaw said it was "the first time in the hotel's 120-year history that a group of St Kilda residents had been refused entry". In 1998, she co-wrote an opinion piece calling for the hotel to be retained. She was the Spokesperson for the Esplanade Alliance, and assisted with the VCAT hearing and fundraising. By 2023, the City of Port Phillip and Becton Corporation reached agreement on The Esplanade Hotel.

In 2003, Shaw published the academic analysis "Planning for the Espy: policies, politics, deals" in the Planning Institute Australia's publication Planning News. She was working on her PhD thesis on the politics of preservation at the time.

== Views on urban planning and housing ==
=== Gentrification ===
Shaw claimed in a 2008 paper that "Preservation of heritage can be used as a deliberate gentrification strategy". In 2015, she claimed that in the context of gentrification "Land is a limited resource, so if somebody is profiting, somebody else is being exploited".

In 2016, in response to a question on whether a socially equitable city exists, she stated cities with a low inequality are often the most diverse and "culturally productive", citing Hamburg, Berlin, Rotterdam and Amsterdam as examples. She cited New York City, San Francisco and Portland as cities better than Australia for urban renewal because of their "high level of city control over planning". She also cited this list of cities in a 2014 article as examples where "unable or unwilling to curb gentrification", local governments ensured "some of the financial returns are invested in rent controls, capital works and purchases for (sub)cultural uses".

In 2015, Shaw stated that gentrification is both "a trendy word to refer to normal processes of urban development" and "an active and careless process of socio-economic exploitation".

=== Housing affordability ===
In 2016, Shaw wrote "Victoria's [planning] system is dire". To improve it, she recommended the Victorian Civil and Administrative Tribunal be abolished and the introduction of mandatory inclusionary zoning requiring "all new residential developments to hand over at least 20 percent at cost to housing associations to manage for community housing".

Shaw said in 2016 that while high-density housing was increasing housing supply, it was not meeting local housing demand increasing affordability. In 2026, she claimed that state and federal governments were deluded that the housing market would build into prices reduce, and that local and international evidence show markets "will resist all attempts to bring prices down". The international examples she cited were 40-story towers in Istanbul, tower demolitions in China due to construction "in areas with low demand", and construction in Vancouver and Toronto failing to reduce prices.

In 2017, Shaw stated that with shortages of affordable housing, as much affordable housing as possible should be built (which she defined as not just public and community housing but "key worker" housing, "below market rent" housing, co-op housing and community land trusts).

=== Resident action ===
In 2004, Shaw said there was a pattern of resident action after John Howard was the Prime Minister of Australia, and that public displays of self-interest were then considered pro-Australian.

== Awards ==
In 2006, Shaw won the AESOP Best Prize Paper Competition for her paper "The Place of Alternative Culture and the Politics of its Protection in Berlin, Amsterdam and Melbourne". Her paper interpreted alternative city cultures as a form of heritage.

In 2024 Shaw was awarded The Royal Society Research Culture Award for making a substantial impact on improving equality, diversity and inclusion through education, outreach, communication and open data.

== Selected publications ==
Shaw includes a list of publications and lectures on her website.

- Porter, L. and Shaw, K. (Eds)(2008) Whose Urban Renaissance? An international comparison of urban regeneration strategies, London: Routledge (ISBN 978-0-415-45682-1)
- Long, C., Shaw, K. and Merlo, C. (Eds)(2005) Suburban fantasies : Melbourne unmasked, Melbourne : Australian Scholarly Publishing (ISBN 174097090X)
- Shaw, K (Ed)(1998) Planning practice 1998 : the best and worst examples of city planning and development, North Melbourne, Vic. : People's Committee for Melbourne (ISBN 0958571708)
