= Internal labor market =

Internal labor markets (ILM) are an administrative unit within a firm in which pricing and allocation of labor is governed by a set of administrative rules and procedures. The remainder of jobs within the ILM is filled by the promotion or transfer of workers who have already gained entry. Internal labor markets are shielded from the competition of external labor markets (ELM). However, competition of ILM exists within the firm in the form of job promotions and pay.

The main reasons why internal labor markets were developed are as follows:

== Skill specificity ==
Skill specificity has two effects important to the generation of the ILM: it increases the proportion of training costs borne by the employer, as opposed to by the trainee and it increases the absolute level of such costs. Companies are ever more seeking individuals with specific talents that can be an asset to their organization. Firms that require specifically trained individuals look for a stable labor force.

== On the job training ==
Many firms are willing to train internal employees for other positions. Since they find no use in workers with experience from other places, they prefer to promote young workers and train them on-the-job. Firms want to maintain the investment afterwards; therefore they offer the employees job security and structured promotions. Due to the importance of on the job training, the promotion is often given by seniority. Also, this way of promotion encourages on the job training, since the eldest worker is not afraid that the young one replaces him. Employers benefit from this more stable relationship because they reduce the cost of training.

== Analysis ==
Analysis of Internal Labor Markets concerns the causes of an organization's (or geography's) workforce dynamics – attraction, development, and retention as well as the rewards that motivate them. Statistical models are often used to explain and predict outcomes because internal labor markets are a complex system of interactions between workers, company management practices and labor market dynamics.

== Customary Law ==
Custom at the workplace is an unwritten set of rules based largely upon past practices or precedent. These rules can govern any aspect of the work relationship from discipline to compensation. Work customs appear to be the outgrowth of employment stability within the internal labor markets. Customary law is of special interest in the analysis of internal labor markets both because of the stabilizing influence which it imparts to the rules of the workplace and because the rules governing the pricing and allocation of labor within the market are particularly subject to the influence of custom.

The internal labor market is composed of many facets. The first is ILMs which consist of clusters of jobs related by the skills and capacities required for their successful performance. Second, the sets of skills required within one job cluster are similar, but different from those required in other job clusters. Third, within any one job cluster, there exists a hierarchy of skills and capacities such that the demands for application of skills on certain jobs facilitate the development of further skills required for other jobs. In this hierarchy those with lower-level jobs requiring skills are usually available in the ELM and higher level jobs require capacities developed from the performance of lower-level jobs usually within the ILM. Fourth, different job levels receive different compensation; high level jobs are associated with higher levels of compensation. Finally, selection and assignment of persons to higher level jobs occurs according to the rules that describe the criteria to be used in these decisions.

== See also ==
- Vacancy chain
- Human capital
