= Sherwin Rosen =

American economist

- Born: September 29, 1938; Chicago, Illinois, US
- Died: March 17, 2001 (aged 62); South Side, Chicago, US

Academic background
- Education: University of Chicago; Purdue University
- Doctoral advisor: H. Gregg Lewis

Academic work
- Discipline: Labor economics
- School or tradition: Chicago School of Economics
- Institutions: University of Chicago
- Doctoral students: Richard Thaler; Justin Yifu Lin; Kevin M. Murphy; Luis Garicano; Antoinette Schoar; Jennifer Roback Morse
- Website: Information at IDEAS / RePEc

Notes
- Relatives: Joseph Epstein (cousin)

Sherwin Rosen (September 29, 1938 – March 17, 2001) was an American labor economist. He had ties with many American universities and academic institutions including the University of Chicago, the University of Rochester, Stanford University and its Hoover Institution. At the time of his death, Rosen was Edwin A. and Betty L. Bergman Distinguished Service Professor in Economics at the University of Chicago and president of the American Economic Association.

Rosen received his B.S. in economics from Purdue University in 1960, his M.A. and Ph.D. in economics from the University of Chicago in 1962 and 1966 respectively.

He was chair of the Economics department at the University of Chicago and colleague to an impressive range of celebrated economists including friend Gary S. Becker. He was elected to the National Academy of Sciences in 1997.

Rosen died at the Bernard Mitchell Hospital on March 17, 2001, at the age of 62.

== Contributions to economics ==
As Palda wrote in 2013

In his 1974 and 1986 articles Sherwin Rosen asked what would happen if you were limited in how you could move about through characteristics space. Rosen pointed out that sometimes when buying a product with several underlying characteristics you could not just go out and span characteristics space by buying a bit of another product with the same characteristics but in different proportions. The reason was that sometimes when you buy something, you are selling something at the same time and are able to sell uniquely to one purchaser. Recombining goods to balance characteristics to suit your tastes is not possible. Rosen called such exchanges tied-sales.

Rosen showed that tied sales could lead to the segregation of people by their types. He argued that the worst effects of segregation could be palliated by a market that resolved supply and demand of complicated tied sales situations through a monetary payment he called an "equalizing difference". This work led to many unexpected insights on the effects of government policy. For example, the minimum wage might not decrease employment, as economists commonly believed, but it might induce employers to provide less on-the-job training to employees. In addition to implications for policy, Rosen's analysis of choice in characteristics space with tied sales specified the conditions under which the parameters of demand and supply function parameters for the underlying characteristics of goods could be deduced from so-called hedonic regressions.

== Selected works ==
- Sherwin (1999), "Potato Paradoxes", Journal of Political Economy, 107 (6, pt. 2): S294–313, doi:10.1086/250112, S2CID 222454869
- Willis, Robert J.; Rosen, Sherwin (1979), "Education and Self-Selection" (PDF), Journal of Political Economy, 87 (5): S7–S36, doi:10.1086/260821, JSTOR 1829907
- "The Economics of Superstars", American Economic Review, 71 (5): 845–858, 1981
- Sherwin (1974), "Hedonic Prices and Implicit Markets: Product Differentiation in Pure Competition", The Journal of Political Economy, 82 (1): 34–55, doi:10.1086/260169, S2CID 39481486

Academic offices
Preceded by Dale W. Jorgenson	President of the American Economic Association; 2001– 2002	Succeeded by Robert Lucas Jr.
